= Hyderabad–Sirpur Kaghaznagar Intercity Express =

Express train in India

Overview
- Service type: Express
- First service: 25 June 2013; 13 years ago
- Current operator: South Central Railway zone

Route
- Termini: Hyderabad Deccan; Sirpur Kaghaznagar/Bidar
- Stops: 11
- Distance travelled: 17011-244 km (152 mi)/ 17012-460 km (286 mi)
- Average journey time: 17011-6 hours 45 mins 17012-10 hours 50mins
- Service frequency: daily
- Train number: 17011 / 17012

On-board services
- Class: general unreserved
- Seating arrangements: Yes
- Sleeping arrangements: Yes
- Catering facilities: No
- Observation facilities: Rake Sharing with 17009 / 17010 Bidar – Hyderabad Intercity Express & 17027 / 17028 Hundry Express

Technical
- Rolling stock: Standard Indian Railways Coaches
- Track gauge: 1,676 mm (5 ft 6 in)
- Operating speed: 47.5 km/h (30 mph)
Route map
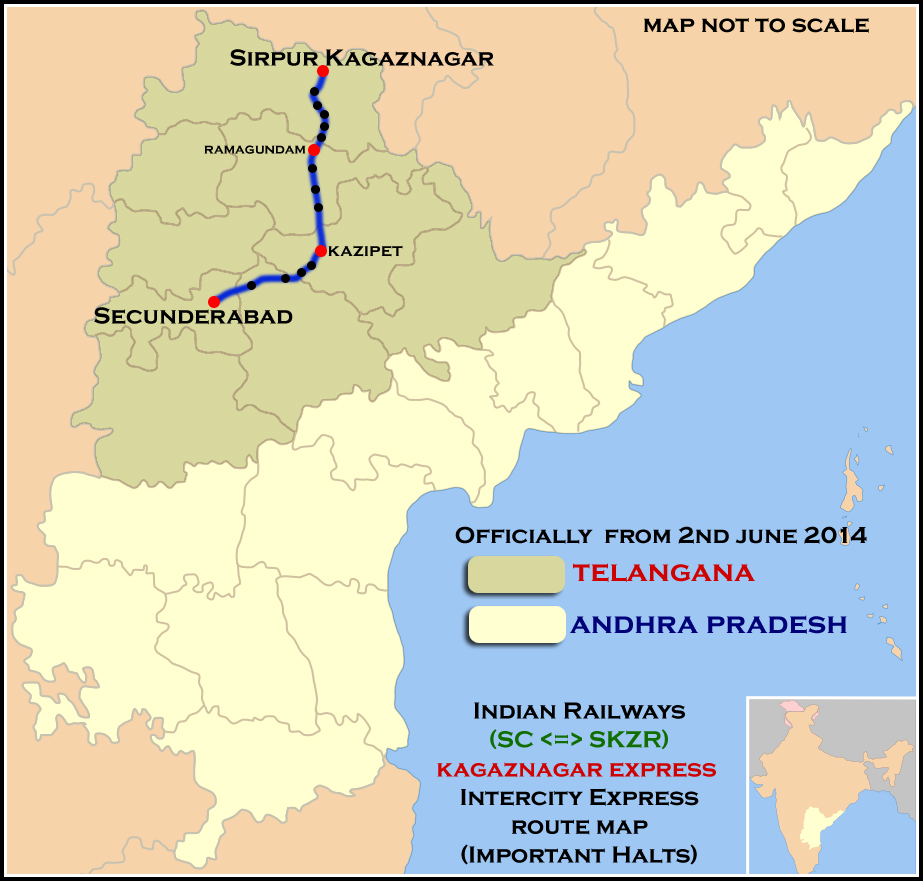

The 17011 / 12 Intercity Express is an express train belonging to Indian Railways South Central Railway zone that runs between Hyderabad Deccan and Sirpur Kaghaznagar as 17011 and Sirpur Kaghaznagar and Bidar as 17012 .

== History ==
This train was first inaugurated on July-12-2012 From Secunderabad Junction to Mancherial. Later Extended to Bellampally & Then Extended Till Sirpur Kaghaznagar. In the year 2024 Sirpur Kaghaznagar- Secunderabad 17012 is extended from Secunderabad till Bidar in One direction only

== Coaches ==
The 17011 / 12 Intercity Express has 16 ICF-CBC Rakes with 2 Ac Chair car, 5 Second sitting Reservation Coaches, 7 General Coaches & 2 SLR Coaches

== Routing ==
The 17011 / 12 Intercity Express runs from Hyderabad Deccan via Secunderabad Junction, Kazipet Junction to Sirpur Kaghaznagar.

== Traction ==
As the route is electrified, a Lallaguda based WAP-7 electric locomotive pulls the train to its destination.

== Timings ==
The schedule is given below:-

KAGHAZNAGAR EXPRESS
| 17011 | | Stations | 17012 | |
|---|---|---|---|---|
| Arrival | Departure | Stations | Arrival | Departure |
| ---- | ---- | Bidar | 23:10 | ---- |
| ---- | ---- | Zaheerabad | 20:45 | 20:46 |
| ---- | ---- | Kohir Deccan | 16:34 | 16:35 |
| ---- | ---- | Marpalli | 20:18 | 20:19 |
| ---- | ---- | Vikarabad | 19:44 | 19:46 |
| ---- | ---- | Shankarpalli | 19:20 | 19:21 |
| ---- | ---- | Lingampally | 18:54 | 18:55 |
| ---- | ---- | Sanathnagar | 18:39 | 18:40 |
| ---- | ---- | Begumpet | 18:24 | 18:25 |
| ---- | 04:35 | Hyderabad Deccan | ---- | ---- |
| 05:08 | 05:10 | Secunderabad Junction | 18:00 | 18:15 |
| 05:24 | 05:25 | Charlapalli.T | 16:59 | 17:00 |
| 05:55 | 05:56 | Bhongir | 16:34 | 16:35 |
| 06:13 | 06:14 | Alair | 16:09 | 16:10 |
| 06:29 | 06:30 | Jangaon | 15:51 | 15:52 |
| 06:50 | 06:51 | Ghanpur | 15:29 | 15:30 |
| 07:21 | 07:23 | Kazipet Junction | 14:58 | 15:00 |
| 07:45 | 07:46 | Uppal | 14:04 | 14:05 |
| 07:55 | 07:56 | Jammikunta | 13:55 | 13:56 |
| 08:05 | 08:06 | Potkapalli | 13:41 | 13:42 |
| 08:10 | 08:11 | Odela | 13:33 | 13:34 |
| 08:25 | 08:26 | Kolanoor | 13:25 | 13:26 |
| 08:39 | 08:40 | Peddapalli Junction | 13:17 | 13:18 |
| 08:55 | 08:56 | Ramagundam | 13:01 | 13:02 |
| 09:12 | 09:13 | Mancherial | 12:48 | 12:49 |
| 09:21 | 09:22 | Ravindrakhani | 12:39 | 12:40 |
| 09:28 | 09:29 | Mandamarri | 12:33 | 12:34 |
| 09:37 | 09:38 | Bellampalli | 12:25 | 12:26 |
| 09:47 | 09:48 | Rechni Road | 12:20 | 12:21 |
| 09:59 | 10:00 | Asifabad | 12:08 | 12:09 |
| 11:00 | ---- | Sirpur Kaghaznagar | ---- | 11:55 |

== Gallery ==
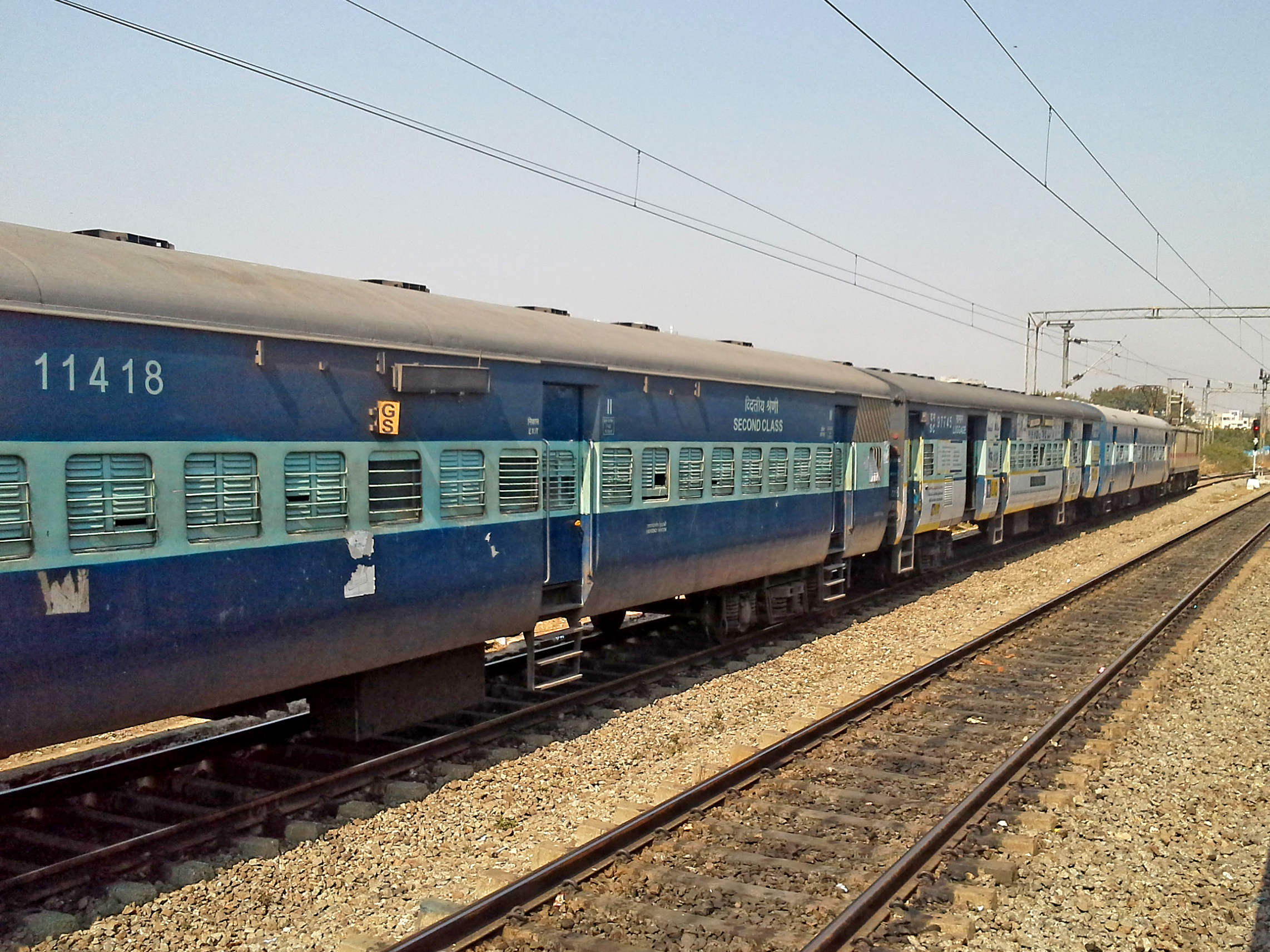
Kaghaznagar Intercity Express at Hyderabad

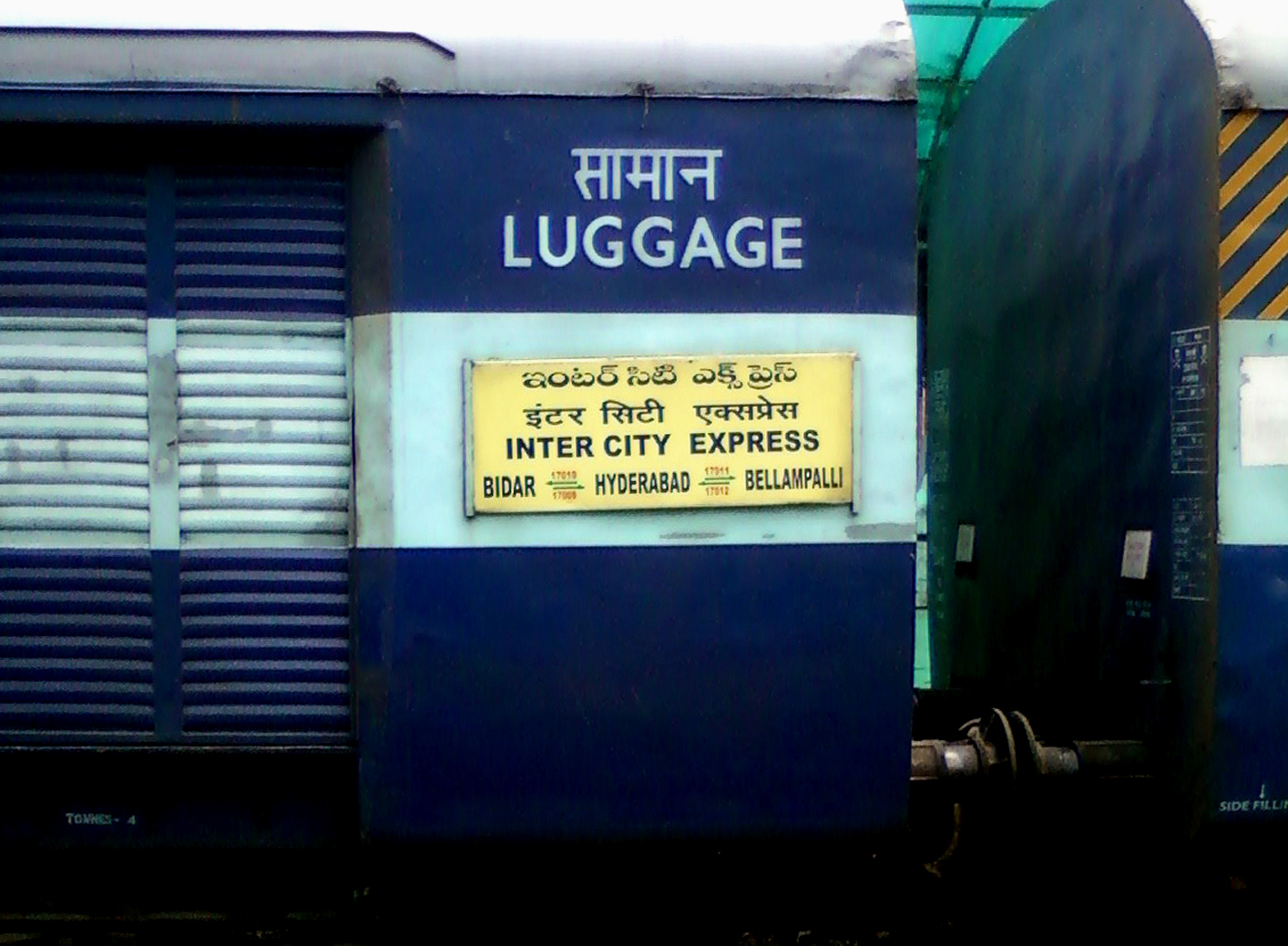
Nameboard of Belampalli Hyderabad Intercity Express

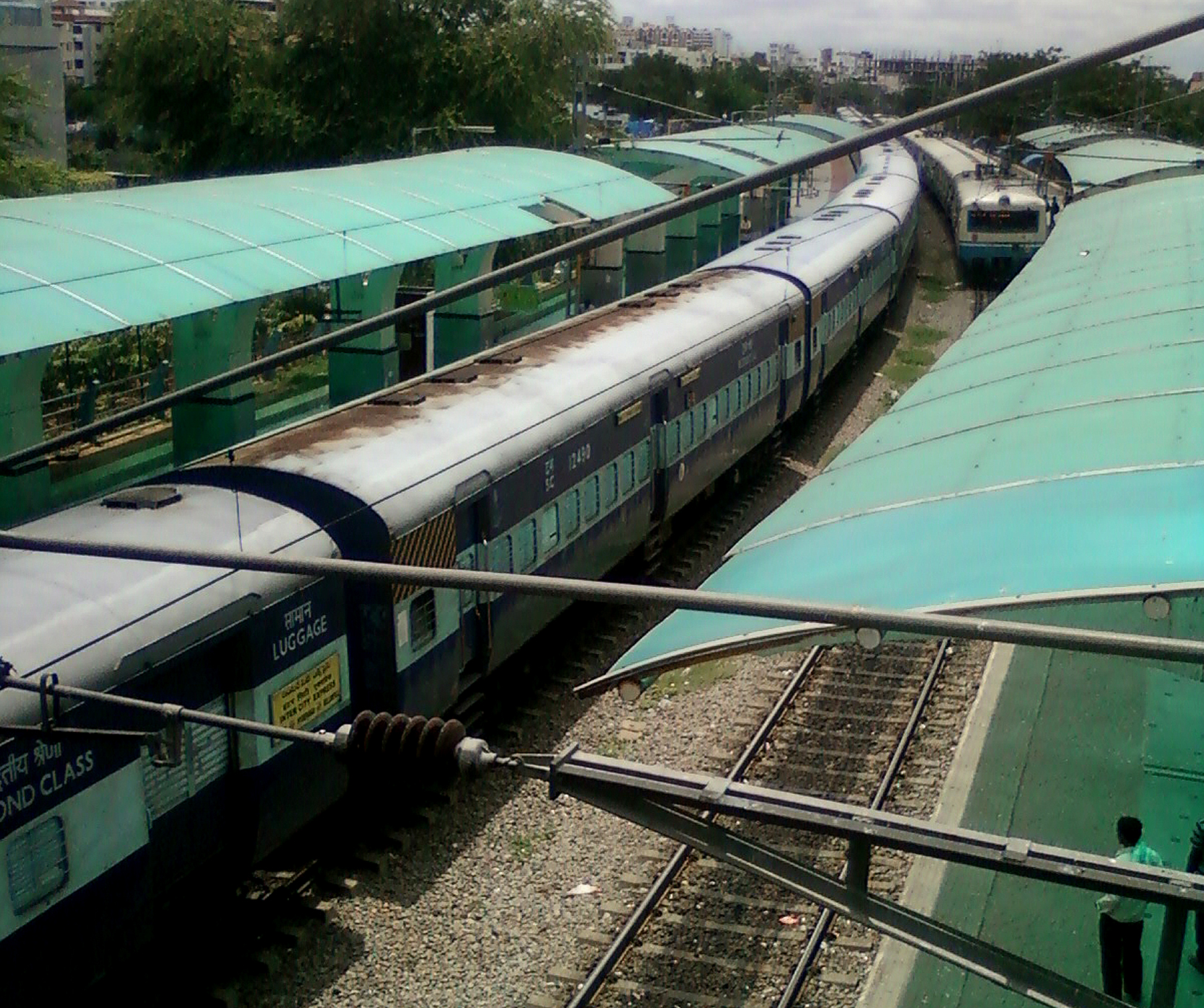
Intercity Express at Necklace Road Station

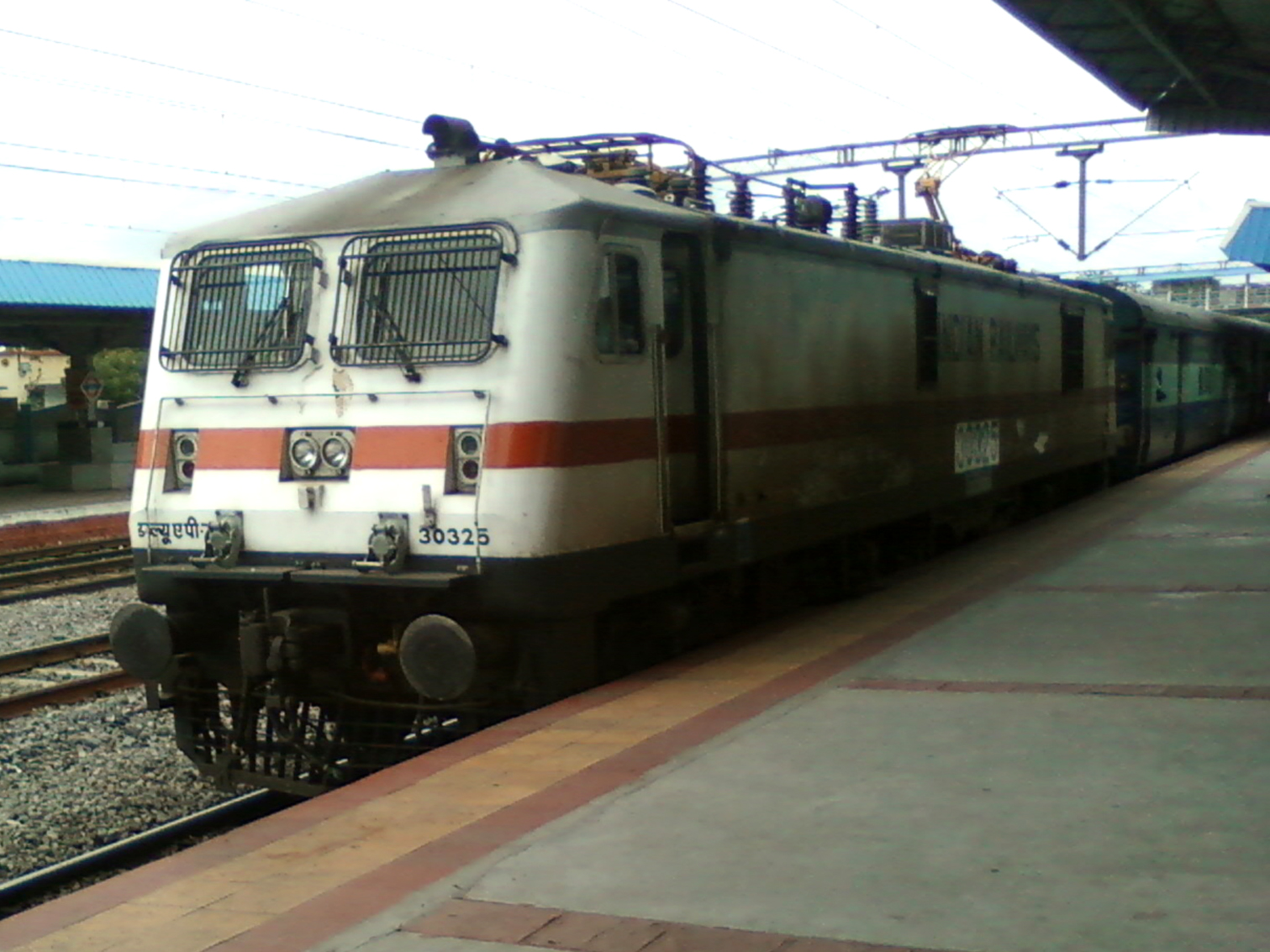
Kaghaznagar Intercity Express at Aler with a WAP7 Loco
