= Vijayawada–Gudur Intercity Express =

Train in India

Vijayawada–Gudur Vikramasimhapuri Amaravati Express

Overview
- Service type: Superfast Express
- Locale: Andhra Pradesh
- First service: 1 September 2019; 6 years ago
- Current operator: South Coast Railway

Route
- Termini: Vijayawada (BZA); Gudur (GDR)
- Stops: 7
- Distance travelled: 294 km (183 mi)
- Average journey time: 4 hours 45 minutes
- Service frequency: Daily
- Train number: 12743 / 12744

On-board services
- Classes: AC 3-Tier Economy, AC Chair Car, Second Class Seating, General Unreserved
- Seating arrangements: Yes
- Sleeping arrangements: No
- Auto-rack arrangements: Overhead racks
- Catering facilities: E-catering
- Observation facilities: Large windows
- Baggage facilities: No
- Other facilities: Below the seats

Technical
- Rolling stock: LHB coach
- Track gauge: Broad Gauge; 1,676 mm (5 ft 6 in)
- Operating speed: 62 km/h (39 mph) average including halts.

The 12743 / 12744 Vijayawada–Gudur Vikramasimhapuri Amaravati Express is a daily superfast express train that runs between Vijayawada Junction and Gudur Junction in Andhra Pradesh. This train belongs to Vijayawada Division of South Coast Railway zone.

== History ==
This train service was introduced in 2019, mainly for the convenience of localities of Nellore, Ongole to visit state's Capital region of Andhra Pradesh. The Gudur Vijaywada Intercity Express was flagged off to a start on 1 September 2019 by Vice-president M Venkaiah Naidu, Union Minister of State for Railways Suresh Angadi and other South Central Railway officials. Its name came from former king of nellore Vikrama Simhapura

== Traction ==
It is hauled by a Vijayawada Loco Shed-based WAP-7 electric locomotive on its entire journey.

== See also ==
- Pinakini Express
- Satavahana Express
- Ratnachal Express
- Vijayawada-Lingampalli Intercity Express
