= Lingampally =

Lingampally may refer to these places in India:

- Lingampally, Hyderabad, or Serilingampally, a suburb of Hyderabad in Ranga Reddy district, Telangana
  - Serilingampally (Vidan Sabha constituency), in the Telangana Legislative Assembly
  - Lingampalli railway station
  - Lingampalli–Indore Humsafar Express, between Indore, Madhya Pradesh and Serilingampally (Hyderabad)
  - Vijayawada–Lingampalli Intercity Express, between Vijayawada, Andhra Pradesh and Serilingampally (Hyderabad)
- Lingampally, Ranga Reddy district, a village in Telangana
- Lingampally, Karimnagar district, a village in Telangana
- Lingampally, Medak District, a village in Telangana

== See also ==
- Linga (disambiguation)
- Palli (disambiguation)
