= Arutla =

Village in Telangana, India

- Village
- Location in Telangana, India Arutla (India)
- Coordinates: 17.1370631°N 78.743825°E
- Country: India
- State: Telangana
- District: Ranga Reddy
- Mandal: Manchal

Area
  - Total: 6,339 ha (15,660 acres)
- Elevation: 523 m (1,716 ft)

Population (2011)
  - Total: 10,037
- Time zone: UTC+5:30 (IST)
- PIN Code: 501508
- Area code: +91-08414
- Vehicle registration: TS-07

Arutla is a village and panchayat in Ranga Reddy district, Telangana, India. It falls under Manchal mandal.

Arutla is very close to Telangana state capital city Hyderabad and well connected to its Mandal and Division Headquarters Ibrahimpatnam. It is located nearly 50 km towards South-East from Mahatma Gandhi Bus Station (MGBS), also known as the Imlibun Bus Station.

Arutla is a Gram Panchayat governed by a Sarpanch and Village Secretary. It comes under the ibrahimpatnam revenue division.

== Demographics ==
Arutla is the largest village in Ibrahimpatnam constituency, the local language is Telugu.

According to the 2011 census, the village has a total population of 10,037, out of which the male population is 5,185 and the female population is 4,852. The literacy rate of Arutla is 49.46%, with female literacy at 39.15% and male literacy at 59.11%. 1,576 people belonged to Scheduled Castes and 2,376 to Scheduled Tribes.

== Library ==
The library in Arutla was established in the year 1920.

== Politics ==
Arutla Grama Pachayat comes under ibrahimpatnam Assembly Constituency and Bhongir Lok Sabha constituency.

In the 2023 Telangana Legislative Assembly election, Malreddy Ranga Reddy was elected as MLA from the Indian National Congress Party in Ibrahimpatnam constituency.

In the 2023 General Election, Chamala Kiran Kumar Reddy was elected as MP.
