= Bidar–Hyderabad Intercity Express =

Express train

Bidar - Hyderabad Intercity Express
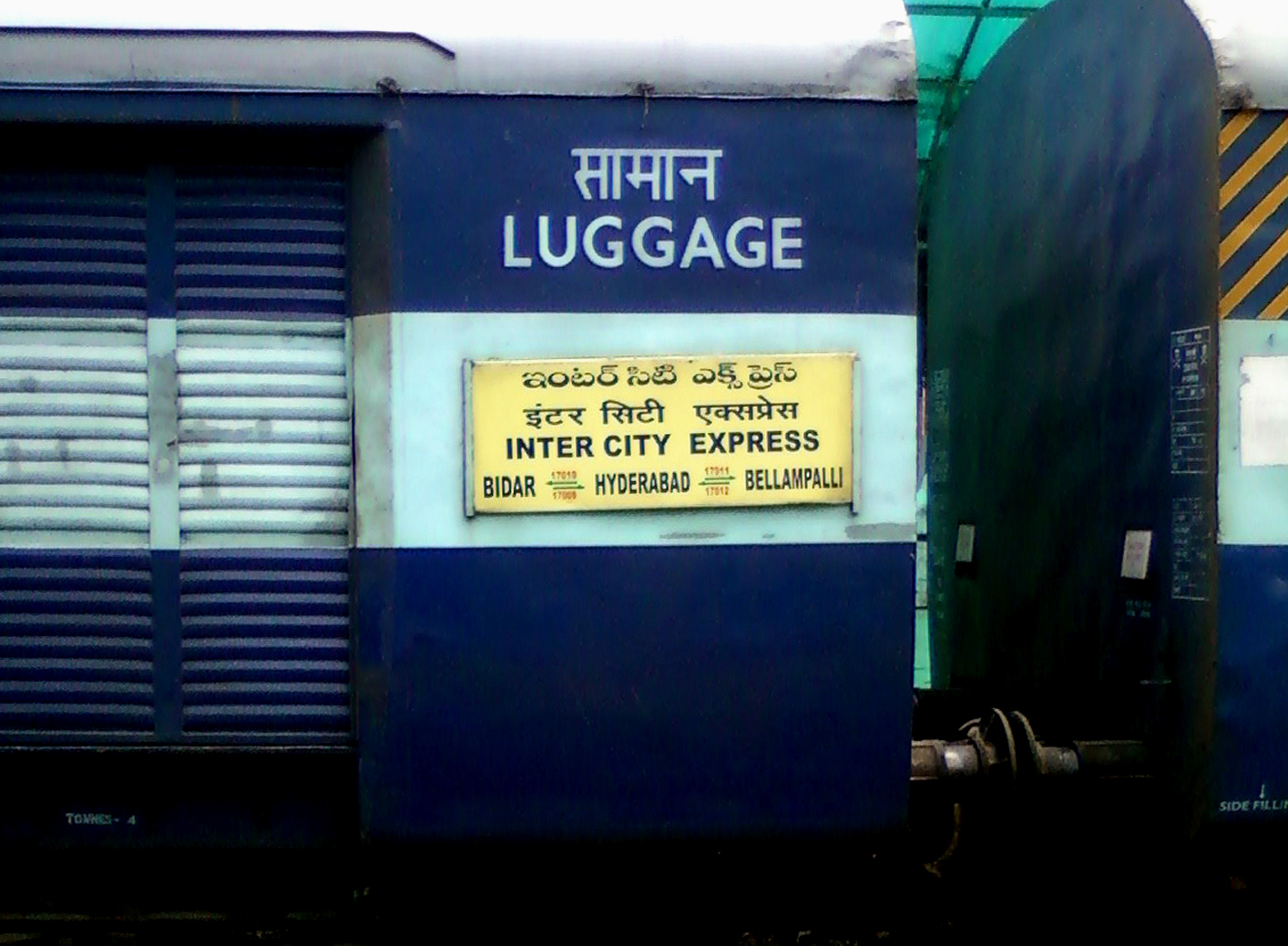

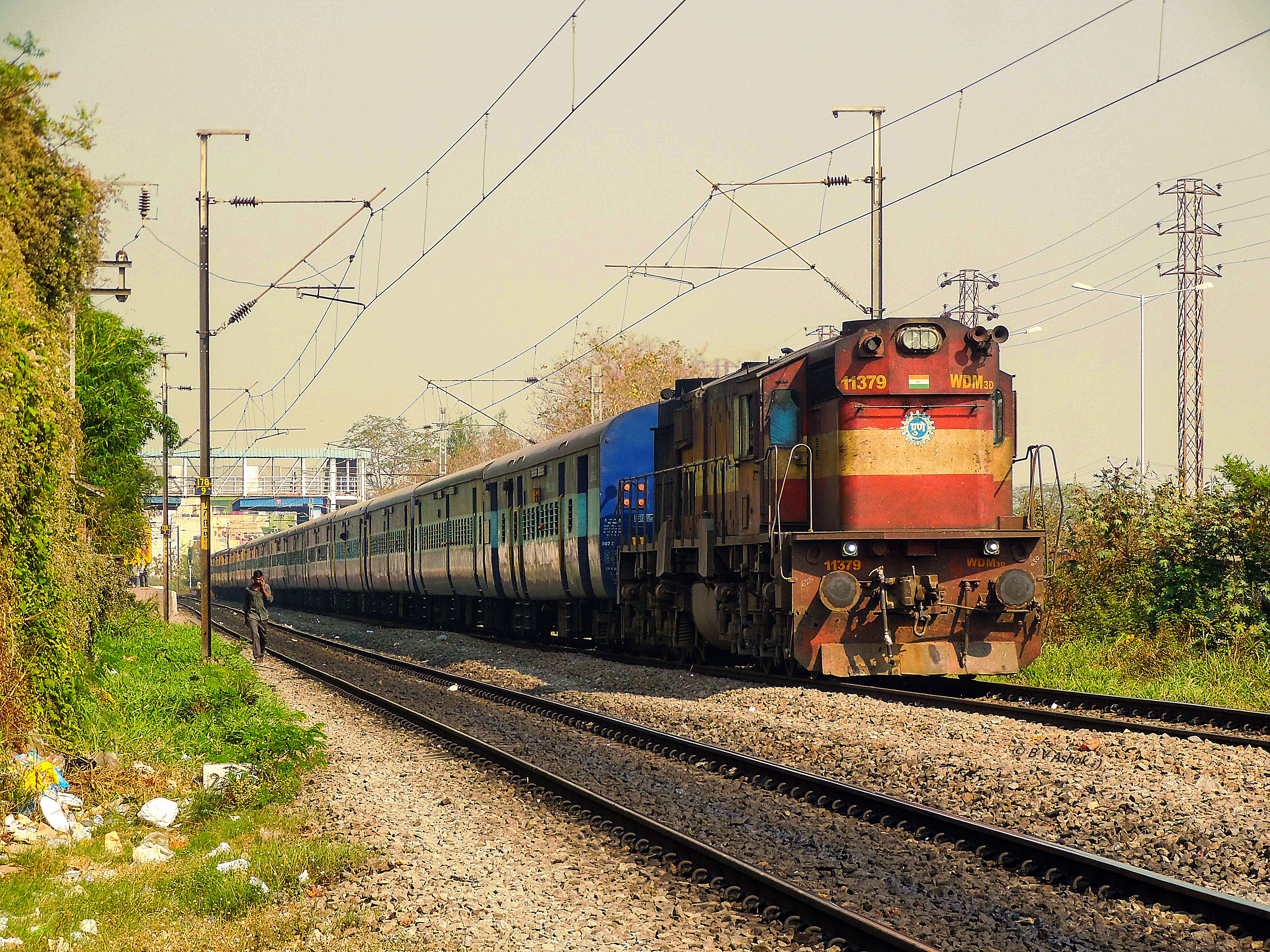
- Bidar Hyderabad Intercity Express

Overview
- Service type: Express
- First service: 10 September 2012; 13 years ago
- Current operator: South Central Railway zone

Route
- Termini: Bidar; Hyderabad Deccan
- Stops: 7
- Distance travelled: 163 km (101 mi)
- Average journey time: 4 hours 07 mins
- Service frequency: six days in a week
- Train number: 17009 / 17010

On-board services
- Class: general unreserved
- Seating arrangements: Yes
- Sleeping arrangements: Yes
- Catering facilities: No
- Observation facilities: Rake Sharing with 17027 / 17028 Hundry Express & 17011 / 17012 Hyderabad–Sirpur Kaghaznagar Intercity Express

Technical
- Rolling stock: Standard Indian Railways Coaches
- Track gauge: 1,676 mm (5 ft 6 in)
- Operating speed: 43.5 km/h (27 mph)
Route map
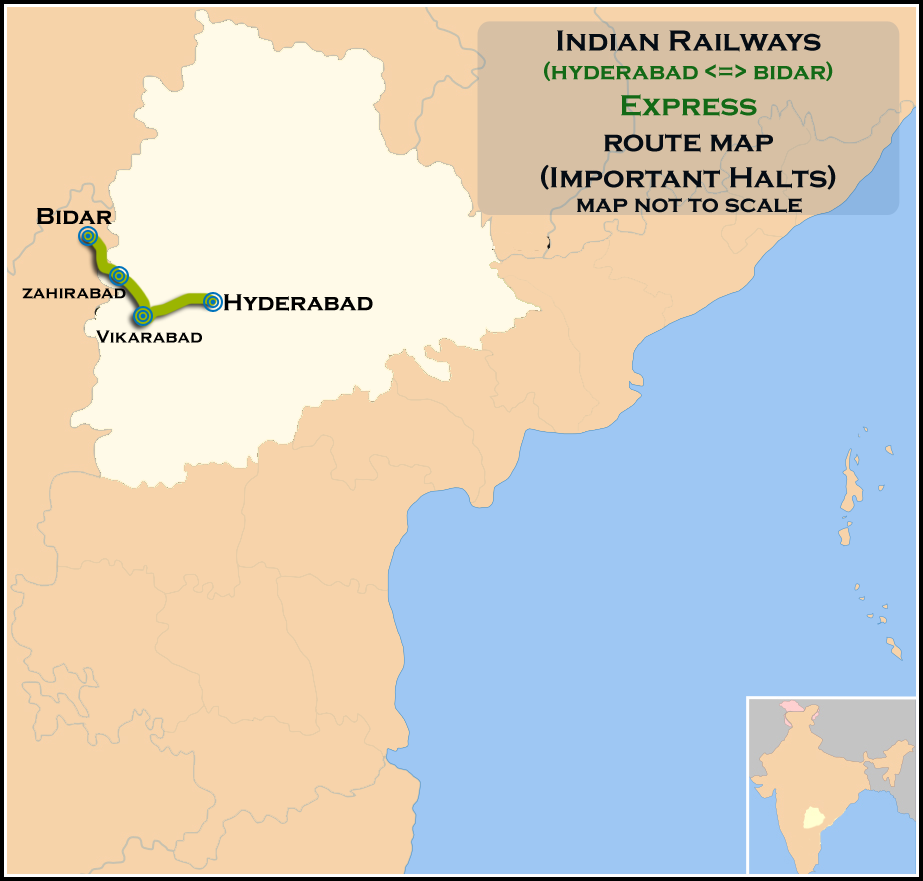

The 17009 / 10 Bidar - Hyderabad Deccan Intercity Express is an Express train belonging to Indian Railways South Central Railway zone that runs between Bidar and Hyderabad Deccan / Secunderabad Junction in India.

It operates as train number 17009 from Bidar to Hyderabad Deccan & Secunderabad Junction and as train number 17010 in the reverse direction serving the states of Karnataka & Telangana.

== Coaches ==
The 17009 / 10 Bidar - Hyderabad Deccan Intercity Express has 18 general unreserved & two SLR (seating with luggage rake) coaches . It does not carry a pantry car coach.

As is customary with most train services in India, coach composition may be amended at the discretion of Indian Railways depending on demand.

== Service ==
The 22869 Bidar - Hyderabad Deccan Intercity Express covers the distance of 163 km (101 mi) in 3 hours 35 mins (46 km/h) and in 4 hours 00 mins as the 17010 Secunderabad Junction - Bidar Intercity Express (41 km/h).

As the average speed of the train is lower than 55 km/h (34 mph), as per railway rules, its fare doesn't includes a Superfast surcharge.

== Routing ==
The 17009 / 10 Bidar - Hyderabad Deccan Intercity Express runs from Bidar via Vikarabad to Hyderabad Deccan.

== Traction ==
As the route is fully electrified, a Lallaguda based WAP-7 electric locomotive pulls the train to its destination.

== See also ==
- Express trains in India
