= Satavahana Express =

Train in India

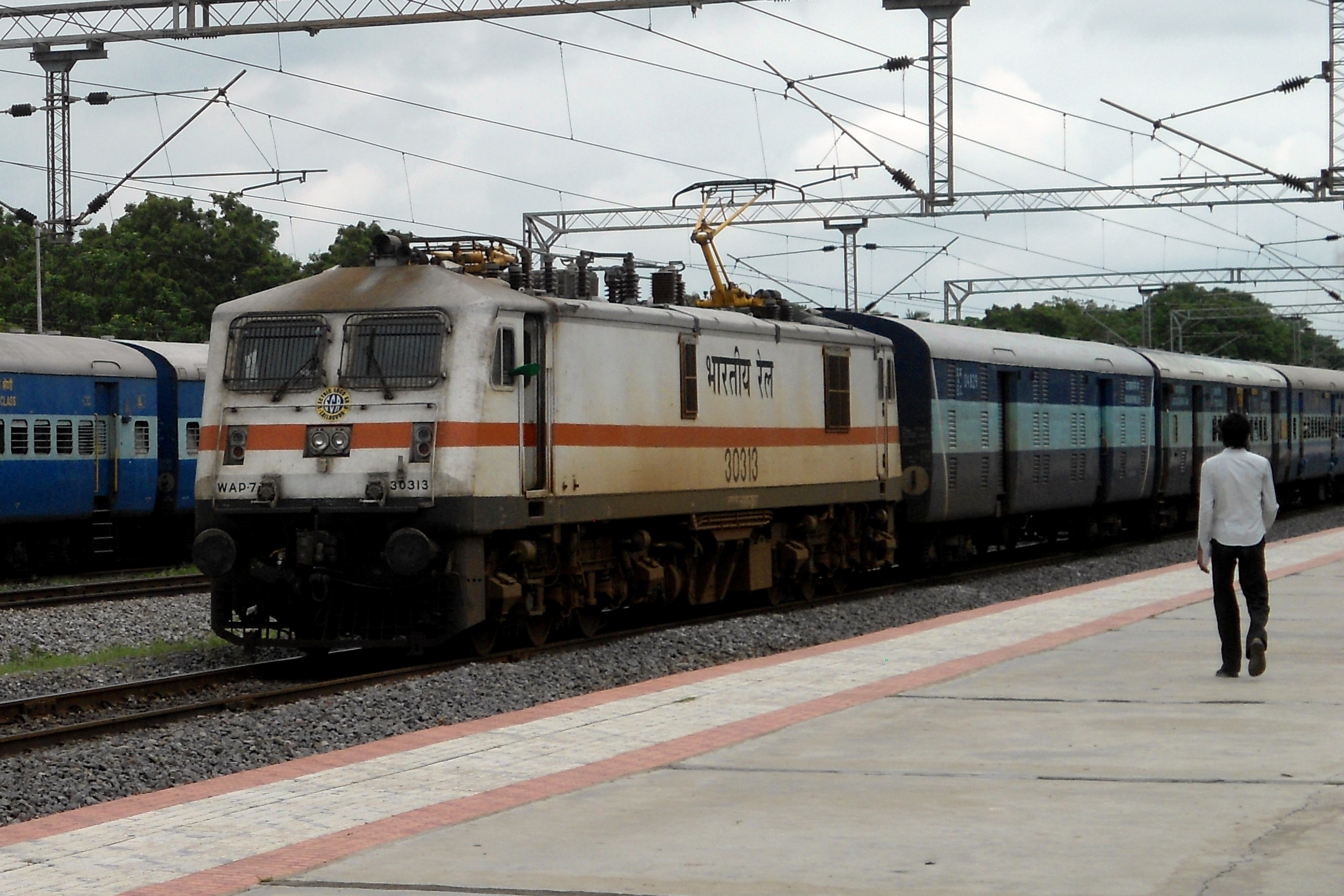
- Lallaguda based WAP-7 hauling Satavahana Express at Ghatkesar.

Overview
- Service type: Superfast Express
- Locale: Andhra Pradesh & Telangana
- First service: 1 July 1992; 34 years ago
- Current operator: South Coast Railway

Route
- Termini: Vijayawada (BZA); Secunderabad (SC)
- Stops: 9
- Distance travelled: 349 km (217 mi)
- Average journey time: 05 hrs 50 mins
- Service frequency: Daily
- Train number: 12713 / 12714

On-board services
- Classes: AC 3 Tier Economy, AC Chair Car, Second class seating, General Unreserved
- Seating arrangements: Yes
- Sleeping arrangements: Yes, AC 3-Tier Economy
- Auto-rack arrangements: Overhead racks
- Catering facilities: E-catering, On-board Catering
- Observation facilities: Large windows
- Baggage facilities: Available
- Other facilities: Below the seats

Technical
- Rolling stock: LHB coach
- Track gauge: Broad Gauge; 1,676 mm (5 ft 6 in)
- Operating speed: 60 km/h (37 mph) average including halts.
Route map
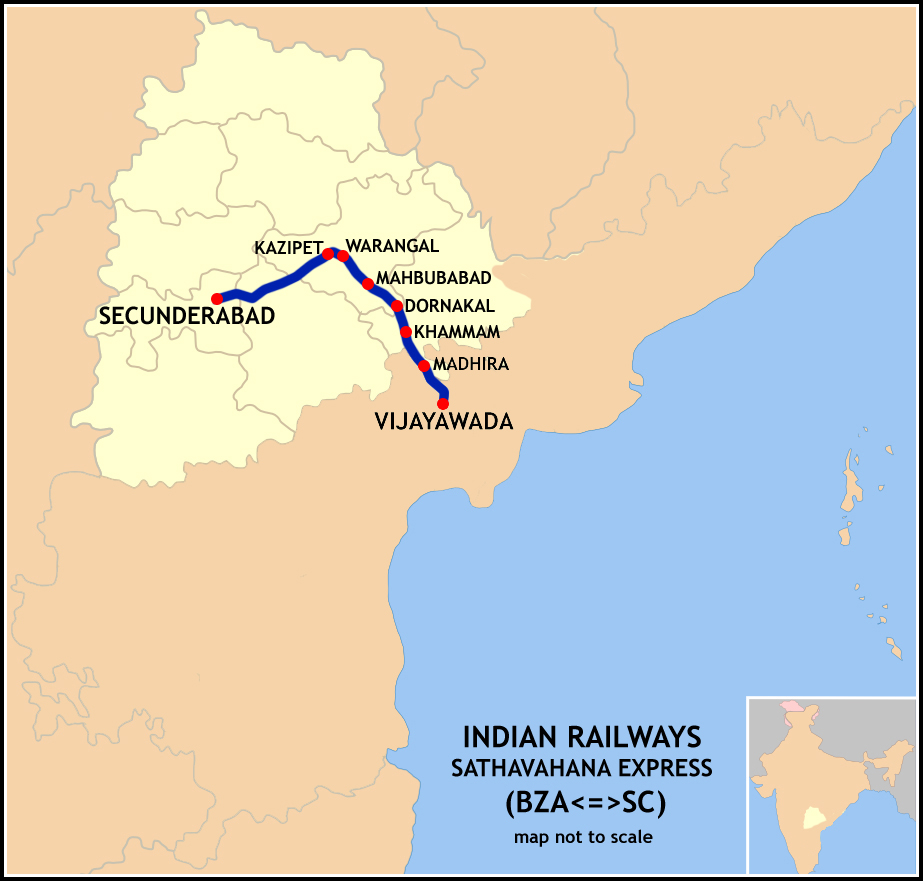

The 12713 / 12714 Satavahana SF Express is a daily Superfast Intercity Express operated by South Coast Railway between Vijayawada Junction of Andhra Pradesh and Secunderabad Junction of Telangana.

== General ==
This is one of the three intercity trains originating from Vijayawada early in the morning with the other two being Pinakini Express and the Ratnachal Express. The train is the third fastest running intercity between Vijayawada and Secunderabad after Vijayawada-Lingampalli Intercity Express and Guntur-Secunderabad Intercity Express. The train on average takes 6hours & 20minutes for onward journey and 6hours & 05 minutes for return journey. The train is maintained by Vijayawada Coach Depo Office and is maintained very well in onward journey rather than return journey. The train usually departs from Platform No.10 in Vijayawada and arrives at Platform No.9 in Secunderabad and departs from Platform No.9 in Secunderabad and arrives at Platform No.10 in Vijayawada. The train usually gets less priority in platform allocation at Secunderabad and is generally poorly handled in SCR limits.

== Etymology ==
The train is called Satavahana in honour of the Satavahana dynasty which ruled areas of Guntur district in Andhra Pradesh and Telangana. The train provides an easy commute to Secunderabad early in the morning from Vijayawada.

== Route & halts ==
- Vijayawada Junction
- Madhira
- Khammam
- Dornakal
- Mahabubabad
- Kesamudram
- Warangal
- Kazipet
- Jangaon
- Charlapalli
- Secunderabad Junction.

== Traction ==
Initially, it was hauled by Lallaguda Loco Shed/Vijayawada Electric Loco Shed WAP-7. But currently, it is hauled by a Lallaguda Loco Shed WAG-9HC electric locomotive from end to end.

== Coach composition ==
Coach composition of Satavahana Express

- From Vijayawada to Secunderabad (12713)

From 10 February 2025 this train was upgraded to LHB Coaches with maximum permissible speed of 130 km/h. But due to frequent allocation of WAG-9HC by Secunderabad railway division, the maximum speed is capped to 90 km/h.

Loco	1	2	3	4	5	6	7	8	9	10	11	12	13	14	15	16	17	18	19	20	21	22	23
	EOG	UR	UR	UR	UR	UR	UR	UR	D1	D2	D3	PC	D4	D5	D6	C1	C2	C3	M1	UR	UR	UR	EOG

- From Secunderabad to Vijayawada(12714)

Loco	1	2	3	4	5	6	7	8	9	10	11	12	13	14	15	16	17	18	19	20	21	22	23
	EOG	UR	UR	UR	M1	C3	C2	C1	D6	D5	D4	PC	D3	D2	D1	UR	UR	UR	UR	UR	UR	UR	EOG

== See also ==
- List of trains run by Indian Railways
