= Vijayawada–Lingampalli Intercity Express =

Train in India

Overview
- Service type: Superfast Express
- Locale: Andhra Pradesh & Telangana
- First service: 20 June 2016; 10 years ago
- Current operator: South Coast Railway

Route
- Termini: Vijayawada (BZA); Lingampalli (LPI)
- Stops: 5
- Distance travelled: 336 km (209 mi)
- Average journey time: 05 hours 50 minutes
- Service frequency: Daily
- Train number: 12795 / 12796

On-board services
- Classes: AC 3-Tier Economy, AC Chair Car, Second Class Seating, General Unreserved
- Seating arrangements: Yes
- Sleeping arrangements: No
- Auto-rack arrangements: Overhead racks
- Catering facilities: On-board catering, E-catering
- Observation facilities: Large windows
- Baggage facilities: Available
- Other facilities: Below the seats

Technical
- Rolling stock: LHB coach
- Track gauge: Broad Gauge; 1,676 mm (5 ft 6 in)
- Operating speed: 58 km/h (36 mph) average with halts.
Route map
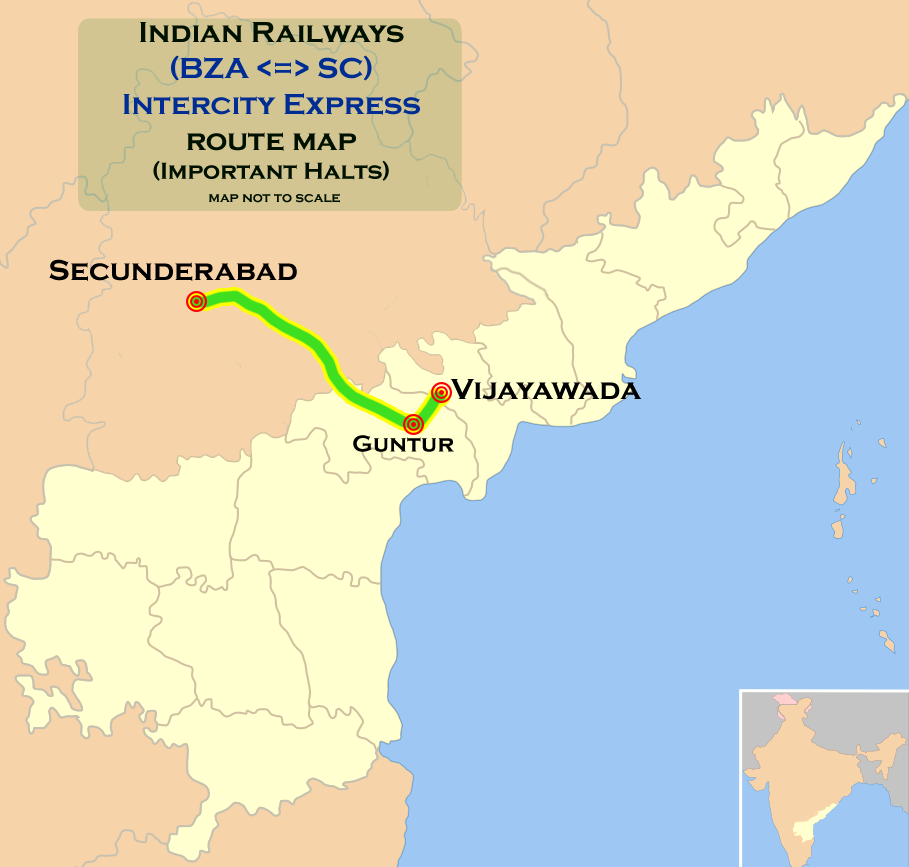

The 12795 / 12796 Vijayawada-Lingampalli Intercity Express is a daily Superfast Express train that runs between Vijayawada Junction in Andhra Pradesh and Lingampalli in Telangana. This train belongs to Vijayawada Division of South Coast Railway zone.

== History ==
This train service was introduced in 2018, mainly for the convenience of Andhra Pradesh government employees commuting between Andhra Pradesh Capital Region and Hyderabad. The Vijayawada-Secunderabad Intercity Express was flagged off to a start on 20 June 2016 by Indian Railway Minister Suresh Prabhu and Chief Minister N. Chandrababu Naidu as the first-ever non-stop train between Guntur and Secunderabad.

The train route initially originated from Secunderabad but was later extended up to Lingampalli in Hyderabad.

== Route and halts ==
- Lingampalli
- Begumpet
- Secunderabad
- Nalgonda
- Guntur
- Mangalagiri
- Vijayawada Junction

== Traction ==
It is hauled by a Lallaguda Loco Shed / Vijayawada Loco Shed-based WAP-7 electric locomotive on its entire journey.

== See also ==
- Pinakini Express
- Satavahana Express
- Ratnachal Express
- Vijayawada-Gudur Intercity Express
