= Yellamma Thanda =

- village
- Country: India
- State: Andhra Pradesh
- District: Ranga Reddy

Government
  - Body: Mandal Office

Languages
  - Official: Telugu
- Time zone: UTC+5:30 (IST)
- Planning agency: Panchayat
- Civic agency: Mandal Office

Yellamma Thanda is a village and panchayat in Ranga Reddy district, Andhra Pradesh, India. It falls under Manchal mandal.
