= Bandalemoor =

- Village
- Country: India
- State: Telangana
- District: Ranga Reddy
- Mandal: Manchal

Government
  - Body: Mandal Office

Population (2011)
  - Total: 2,079

Languages
  - Official: Telugu
- Time zone: UTC+5:30 (IST)
- Vehicle registration: TS
- Planning agency: Panchayat
- Civic agency: Mandal Office
- Website: telangana.gov.in

Bandalemoor is a village and panchayat in Ranga Reddy district, Telangana, India. It falls under Manchal mandal.

In the 2011 census, 2,079 people were recorded as living in Bandalemoor, in 515 houses. 1,121 of those people were male, and 958 female. The literacy rate was 53.90%. A total of 228 belonged to Scheduled Castes and 984 to Scheduled Tribes.
