= Nomula, Ranga Reddy district =

Coordinates: 17°12′N 79°27′E

Nomula
- village
- Interactive map of Nomula
- Country: India
- State: Telangana
- District: Ranga Reddy
- Mandal: Manchal

Government
  - Body: Mandal Office

Population (2011)
  - Total: 1,932

Languages
  - Official: Telugu
- Time zone: UTC+5:30 (IST)
- Planning agency: Panchayat
- Civic agency: Mandal Office

Nomula is a village and panchayat in Ranga Reddy district, Telangana, India. It falls under Manchal mandal.

In the 2011 census, 1,932 people were recorded as living in Nomula, in 445 houses. 999 of those people were male, and 933 female. The literacy rate was 57.11%. A total of 668 belonged to Scheduled Castes and 10 to Scheduled Tribes.
