= Rangapur, Manchal mandal =

Rangapur Chukkapuripatnam
- Village
- Country: India
- State: Telangana
- District: Ranga Reddy
- Mandal: Manchal
- Talukas: Manchal

Government
  - Body: Mandal Office

Population (2011)
  - Total: 1,119

Languages
  - Official: Telugu
- Time zone: UTC+5:30 (IST)
- PIN: 501 xxx

Rangapur is a village in Ranga Reddy district of Telangana, India. It falls under Manchal mandal. It is also famous as "Chukkapuri Gutta" by having one of the Indian observatories in it. It is located 50 km from Hyderabad.

The village is 45 km away from the Telangana state capital Hyderabad. The Village attracts the attention of every one because it is located in the middle of mandal. The Osmania and Nizamiya Observatories of Osmania University are located in this village. This Osmania Observatory is famous for its 48’’ (inch dia) Telescope which is supposed to be the second biggest in the Asia and it attracts scientists and researchers in astronomy to study solar & lunar eclipses even from USA, Germany etc, abroad occasionally. Older people used to also call Rangapur as "Chukkapuripatnam" reflecting the Observatory. Social Forestry is encouraged in cooperation with neighboring village Japala and trees are encouraged and protected with peoples’ support thus greenery is developed around this Observatory.

OBSERVATORY: It is the place where we can see the space with special machine called telescope. It also helps to know the placements, formations and changes occurred in the galaxy. Telescope: It is the device which is used to see the galaxy environment. Asia’s 1st largest telescope is started on 2 May 1982 of size 90 inches is established at ‘Kawali’ in Bangalore. The 2nd largest telescope of size 48 inches is started in the year 1974 at Rangapur in Hyderabad. This Rangapur Observatory was supported by Osmania University. The Village Rangapur is also called as ‘Chukkapurpatnam’.

Many scientists visits Rangapur Observatory and do research. There is an exhibition in winter to allow the visitors to visit that place and they show the galaxy environment with the help of Telescope.

In the 2011 census, 1,119 people were recorded as living in Rangapur, in 260 houses. 506 of those people were male, and 613 female. The literacy rate was 66.09%. A total of 128 belonged to Scheduled Castes and 222 to Scheduled Tribes.
