= Cheeded =

- Village
- Country: India
- State: Telangana
- District: Ranga Reddy
- Mandal: Manchal

Government
  - Body: Mandal Office

Population (2011)
  - Total: 1,046

Languages
  - Official: Telugu
- Time zone: UTC+5:30 (IST)
- Vehicle registration: TS
- Planning agency: Panchayat
- Civic agency: Mandal Office
- Website: telangana.gov.in

Cheeded is a village and panchayat in Ranga Reddy district, Telangana, India. It falls under Manchal mandal.

In the 2011 census, 1,046 people were recorded as living in Cheeded, in 247 houses. 469 of those people were male, and 577 female. The literacy rate was 51.59%. A total of 215 belonged to Scheduled Castes and 5 to Scheduled Tribes.
