= Gudur Junction railway station =

Railway Station in Andhra Pradesh

Gudur Junction
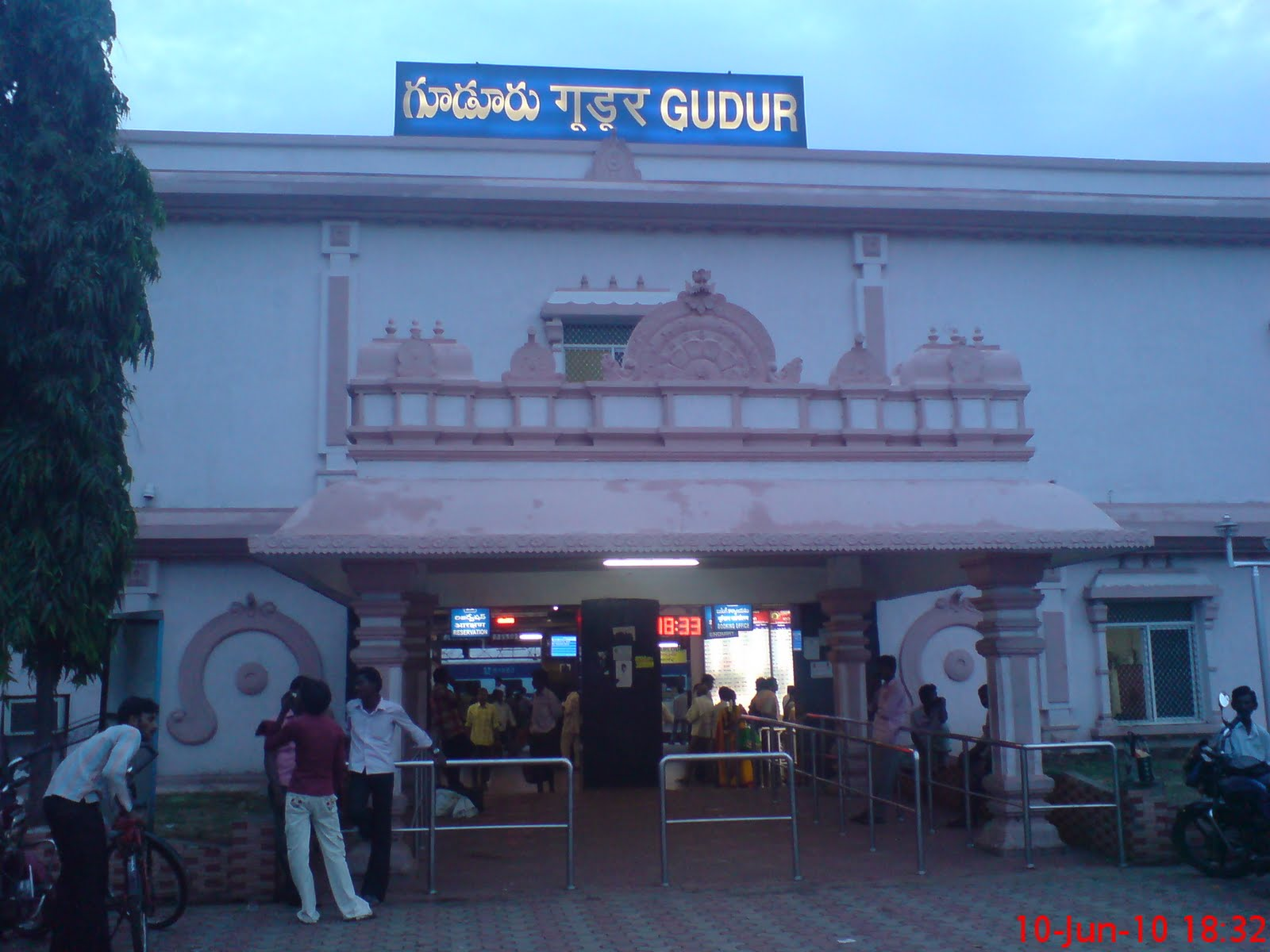
- Gudur Junction Main Entrance

General information
- Location: Muthyalapeta, Gudur, SPSR Nellore district, Andhra Pradesh; India
- Coordinates: 14.1484139°N 79.8452353°E
- System: Indian Railways station
- Owner: Indian Railways
- Operator: Indian Railways
- Lines: Howrah–Chennai main line; Delhi–Chennai line; Vijayawada–Chennai section; Gudur–Katpadi branch line
- Platforms: 5
- Tracks: 8 5 ft 6 in (1,676 mm) broad gauge

Construction
- Structure type: Standard (on ground)
- Accessible: Disabled access

Other information
- Status: Active
- Station code: GDR
- Zone(s): SCR
- Division(s): Vijayawada
- Classification: Non-Suburban Grade-3 (NSG-3)

History
- Opened: 1893
- Electrified: 1980–81

Passengers
- 28.5 million

Services
Preceding station	Indian Railways	Following station
Manubolu towards ?	South Coast Railway zone Vijayawada–Chennai section of Howrah–Chennai main line	Odur towards ?
Route map
Location
- Location within Andhra Pradesh Location within India
- Interactive map

Gudur Junction railway station (station code: GDR) is an Indian Railways station in Gudur of SPSR Nellore district, Andhra Pradesh. It is a major junction station with branch lines to Arakkonam Junction and Katpadi Junction. It is administered under Vijayawada railway division of South Central Railway zone.

== History ==
The Vijayawada–Chennai link was established in 1899. The Chirala–Elavur section was electrified in 1980–81.

== Classification ==
In terms of earnings and outward passengers handled, Gudur is categorized as a Non-Suburban Grade-3 (NSG-3) railway station. Based on the re–categorization of Indian Railway stations for the period of 2017–18 and 2022–23, an NSG–3 category station earns between ₹20–₹100 crore and handles 5–10 million passengers.

== Station amenities ==
Gudur Junction is one of the 38 stations in the division to be equipped with Automatic Ticket Vending Machines (ATVMs).

Newly introduced Vijayawada-Gudur Intercity Express runs from Vijayawada to Gudur.

12709 Simhapuri Express starts from Gudur
