= Loyapally =

- Village
- Country: India
- State: Telangana
- District: Ranga Reddy
- Mandal: Manchal

Government
  - Body: Mandal Office

Population (2011)
  - Total: 6,078

Languages
  - Official: Telugu
- Time zone: UTC+5:30 (IST)
- PIN: 508245
- Planning agency: Panchayat
- Civic agency: Mandal Office
- Website: telangana.gov.in

Loyapally is a village and panchayat in Ranga Reddy district, Telangana, India. It falls under Manchal mandal.

In the 2011 census, 6,078 people were recorded as living in Loyapally, in 1,409 houses. 3,200 of those people were male, and 2,878 female. The literacy rate was 56.10%. A total of 469 belonged to Scheduled Castes and 2,302 to Scheduled Tribes.
