= Dadpally =

Coordinates: 17.0538°N 78.7257°E

- Village
- Interactive map of Dadpally
- Country: India
- State: Telangana
- District: Ranga Reddy
- Mandal: Manchal

Government
  - Body: Mandal Office

Population (2011)
  - Total: 1,359

Languages
  - Official: Telugu
- Time zone: UTC+5:30 (IST)
- Vehicle registration: TS
- Planning agency: Panchayat
- Civic agency: Mandal Office

Dadpally is a village and panchayat in Ranga Reddy district, Telangana, India. It falls under Manchal mandal.

In the 2011 census, 1,359 people were recorded as living in Dadpally, in 292 houses. 705 of those people were male, and 654 female. The literacy rate was 56.02%. A total of 79 belonged to Scheduled Castes and 687 to Scheduled Tribes.
