= Tippaiguda =

- village
- Country: India
- State: Telangana
- District: Ranga Reddy
- Mandal: Manchal

Government
  - Body: Mandal Office

Population (2011)
  - Total: 1,065

Languages
  - Official: Telugu
- Time zone: UTC+5:30 (IST)
- PIN: 501508
- Planning agency: Panchayat
- Civic agency: Mandal Office

Tippaiguda is a village and panchayat in Ranga Reddy district, Telangana, India. It falls under Manchal mandal.

The village is close to the Rachakonda Fort, and was ruled by Pulikanti Dynasty belongs to Reddy community under the Nizam of Hyderabad.

In the 2011 census, 1,065 people were recorded as living in Tippaiguda, in 262 houses. 569 of those people were male, and 496 female. The literacy rate was 54.85%. A total of 293 belonged to Scheduled Castes and 3 to Scheduled Tribes.
