= Japal =

Japal japal
- Village
- Location in Telangana, India
- Coordinates: 17°07′N 78°43′E
- Country: India
- State: Telangana
- District: Ranga Reddy
- Mandal: Manchal

Government
  - Body: Mandal Office

Population (2011)
  - Total: 2,130

Languages
  - Official: Telugu
- Time zone: UTC+5:30 (IST)
- Postal code: 501508
- Vehicle registration: 07
- Planning agency: Panchayat
- Civic agency: Mandal Office

Japal is a village and panchayat in Ranga Reddy district, Telangana, India. It falls under Manchal mandal.

In the 2011 census, 2,130 people were recorded as living in Japal, in 512 houses. 1,103 of those people were male, and 1,022 female. The literacy rate was 66.18%. A total of 480 belonged to Scheduled Castes and 21 to Scheduled Tribes.
