= Bodakonda =

- Village
- Location in Telangana, India Bodakonda (India)
- Coordinates: 17°04′N 78°47′E
- Country: India
- State: Telangana
- District: Ranga Reddy
- Mandal: Manchal

Government
  - Body: Mandal Office

Population (2011)
  - Total: 4,825

Languages
  - Official: Telugu
- Time zone: UTC+5:30 (IST)
- Vehicle registration: TS
- Planning agency: Panchayat
- Civic agency: Mandal Office
- Website: telangana.gov.in

Bodakonda is a village and panchayat in Ranga Reddy district, Telangana, India. It falls under Manchal mandal.

In the 2011 census, 4,825 people were recorded as living in Bodakonda, in 1,149 houses. 2,529 of those people were male, and 2,299 female. The literacy rate was 45.90%. A total of 69 belonged to Scheduled Castes and 3,568 to Scheduled Tribes.
