= Lingampally, Karimnagar district =

Lingampally is a village in Vemulawada mandal of Karimnagar district in Telangana, India. It has a Brahma Temple. This is unique after the Brahma Temple of Varanasi.
