= Malreddy Ranga Reddy =

Indian politician (born 1956)

Member of the Telangana Legislative Assembly
- Incumbent
- Assumed office December 2023

Member of the Andhra Pradesh Legislative Assembly
- In office 1994–1999
- In office 2004–2009

Personal details
- Born: 1956 (age 69–70)
- Party: Indian National Congress

Malreddy Ranga Reddy (born 1956) is an Indian politician from Telangana state. He is a member of the Telangana Legislative Assembly from Ibrahimpatnam Assembly constituency in Ranga Reddy district. He represents Indian National Congress and won the 2023 Telangana Legislative Assembly election. He also represented Malakpet Assembly constituency as MLA for two times from 1994 to 1999 and 2004 to 2009.

== Electoral History ==
Year	Constituency	Party	Votes	%	Opponent	Party	Votes	%	Result	Margin	%
1994	Malakpet	TDP	56,183	40.54	N. Indrasena Reddy	BJP	46,128	33.28	Won	+10,055	+7.26
2004	Malakpet	INC	1,13,822	50.15	N. Indrasena Reddy	BJP	90,464	39.86	Won	+23,358	+10.29
2009	Ibrahimpatnam	INC	47,292	30.58	Manchireddy Kishan Reddy	TDP	56,508	36.54	Lost	-9,216	-5.96
2014	Ibrahimpatnam	INC	36,865	20.32	Manchireddy Kishan Reddy	TDP	48,397	26.67	Lost	-11,532	-6.35
2018	Ibrahimpatnam	BSP	72,205	36.68	Manchireddy Kishan Reddy	BRS	72,581	36.87	Lost	-376	-0.19
2023	Ibrahimpatnam	INC	1,26,506	50.92	Manchireddy Kishan Reddy	BRS	89,806	36.14	Won	+36,700	+14.78

== Early life and education ==
Reddy hails from an agricultural family in Ibrahimpatnam, an erstwhile Hyderabad suburb. His later father M. Bal Reddy was a farmer. He completed his schooling in 1973 at Zilla Parishad High School, Hayathnagar, R.R. District. Later, he did his post graduation in Arts and passed out from Madurai Kamaraj University, Madurai, Tamil Nadu, in 2005.

== Career ==
Reddy won from Ibrahimpatnam Assembly constituency representing Indian National Congress in the 2023 Telangana Legislative Assembly election. He polled 126,506 votes and defeated his nearest rival, Manchireddy Kishan Reddy of Bharat Rashtra Samithi, by a huge margin of 36,700 votes. As a Bahujan Samaj Party candidate, he lost the 2018 Telangana Legislative Assembly election by a narrow margin of 376 votes to Kishan Reddy. Earlier, he lost the 2014 Andhra Pradesh Legislative Assembly election from the same seat as an Indian National Congress candidate. Thus, he became third time lucky winning the Ibrahimpatnam seat in 2023.
