= Manchal mandal =

Manchal
- Mandal
- Location in Telangana, India Manchal (India)
- Coordinates: 17.1628°N 78.7236°E
- Country: India
- State: Telangana
- District: Ranga Reddy district

Languages
  - Official: Telugu
- Time zone: UTC+5:30 (IST)
- Website: telangana.gov.in

Manchal is a Mandal in Ranga Reddy district, Telangana. It is located in the Ibrahimpatnam Assembly constituency.

== Geography ==
Manchal is located at 17.1628°N 78.7236°E.

== Panchayats ==
There are 24 Gram panchayats in the Mandal.

- Manorabad
- Sabithnagar
- Lingampally
- Thallapalliguda
- Thippaiguda
- Chittapur
- Manchal
- Nomula
- Agapally
- Kagazghat
- Japala
- Rangapur
- Cheeded
- Dadpally
- Bodakonda
- Asmatpur
- Chandkhanguda
- Arutla
- Bandalemoor
- Loyapally
- Nallachervu
- Mallikarjunaguda
- Srimanthuguda
- Jainammaguda
