= Ibrahimpatnam Assembly constituency =

Constituency of the Telangana legislative assembly in India

Coordinates: 17.19°N 78.65°E

Ibrahimpatnam
- Constituency No. 48 for the Telangana Legislative Assembly
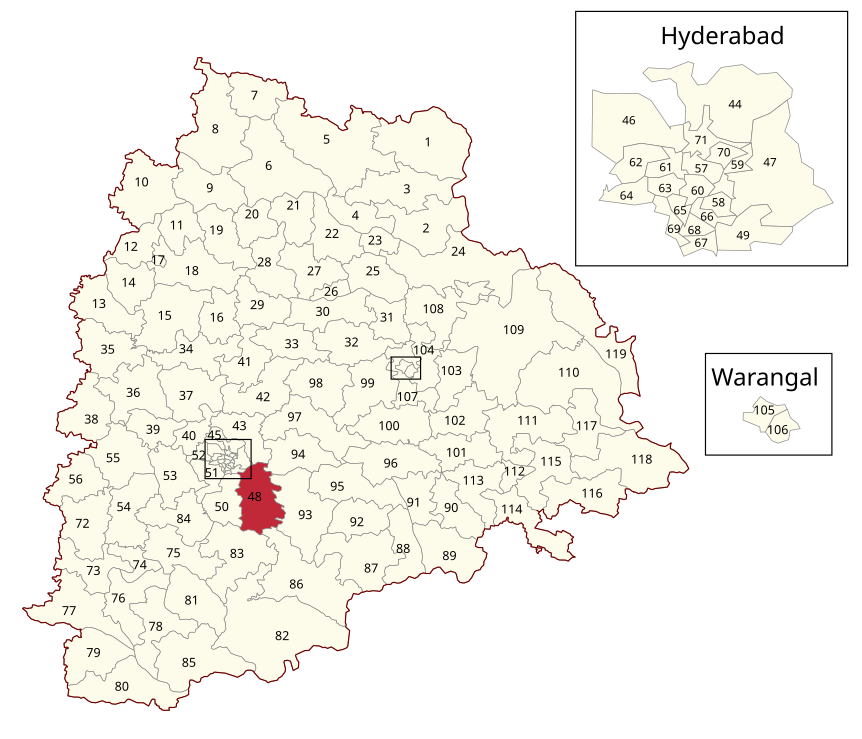
- Location of Ibrahimpatnam Assembly constituency within Telangana

Constituency details
- Country: India
- Region: South India
- State: Telangana
- District: Ranga Reddy
- Lok Sabha constituency: Bhongir
- Established: 1951
- Total electors: 2,91,736
- Reservation: None

Member of Legislative Assembly
- 3rd Telangana Legislative Assembly
- Incumbent Malreddy Rangareddy
- Party: Indian National Congress
- Elected year: 2023

Ibrahimpatnam Assembly constituency is a constituency of Telangana Legislative Assembly, India. It is one of 14 constituencies in Ranga Reddy district. It is part of Bhongir Lok Sabha constituency.

Malreddy Ranga Reddy is currently representing the constituency.

== Mandals ==
The Assembly Constituency presently comprises the following Mandals:

Mandal
Ibrahimpatnam
Hayathnagar
Manchal
Yacharam
Abdullahpuramet

ibrahimpatnam Municipality

- Adibatla Municipality

- Turkayamjal Municipality

- Pedda Amberpet Municipality

== Members of the Legislative Assembly ==
Year	Member	Party
2023	Malreddy Ranga Reddy	Indian National Congress
2018	Manchireddy Kishan Reddy	Telangana Rashtra Samithi
2014	Manchireddy Kishan Reddy	Telugu Desam Party
2009	Manchireddy Kishan Reddy	Telugu Desam Party
2004	Masku Narsimha	Communist Party of India (Marxist)
1999	Kondru Pushpa Leela	Telugu Desam Party
1994	Kondigari Ramulu	Communist Party of India (Marxist)
1989	Kondigari Ramulu	Communist Party of India (Marxist)
1985	K. Satyanarayana	Telugu Desam Party
1983	A. G. Krishna	Indian National Congress
1981	A. G. Krishna	Indian National Congress
1978	Sumitra Devi	Indian National Congress
1972	N. Anantha Reddy	Indian National Congress
1967	M. N. Lakshminarsaiah	Indian National Congress
1962	M. N. Lakshminarsaiah	Indian National Congress
1957	M. N. Lakshminarsaiah	Indian National Congress
1952	M.B. Gautam	Indian National Congress
1952	K. Papi Reddy	People's Democratic Front

== Election results ==
=== 2023 ===
2023 Telangana Legislative Assembly election: Ibrahimpatnam
Party	Candidate	Votes	%	±%
INC	Malreddy Ranga Reddy	126,506	50.92	
BRS	Manchireddy Kishan Reddy	89,806	36.14	
BJP	Nomula Dayanand	15,790	6.36	
NOTA	None of the Above	1,427	0.57	
Majority		36,700	14.78	
Turnout		2,48,509	75.85	
INC gain from BRS		Swing		

=== 2018 ===
2018 Telangana Legislative Assembly election: Ibrahimpatnam
Party	Candidate	Votes	%	±%
TRS	Manchireddy Kishan Reddy	72,581	36.87	
BSP	Malreddy Ranga Reddy	72,205	36.68	
TDP	Sama Ranga Reddy	18,053	9.17	
BJP	Ashok Kotha	17,129	8.70	
NOTA	None of the Above	1,151	0.58	
Majority		376	0.19	
Turnout		1,96,851	76.38	
TRS gain from TDP		Swing		

=== 2009 ===
2009 Andhra Pradesh Legislative Assembly election: Ibrahimpatnam
Party	Candidate	Votes	%	±%
TDP	Manchireddy Kishan Reddy	56,508	36.54	
INC	Malreddy Ranga Reddy	47,292	30.58	
PRP	Tulla Devender Goud	35,179	22.75	
Majority		11,056	5.98	
Turnout		1,81,443	81.92	
TDP hold		Swing		

=== 2004 ===
2004 Andhra Pradesh Legislative Assembly election: Ibrahimpatnam (SC)
Party	Candidate	Votes	%	±%
CPI(M)	Masku Narsimha	67,288	49.84	
TDP	Narra Ravi Kumar	54,481	40.36	
IND	Hanumagalla Chandraiah	3,847	2.85	
IND	Allakonda Anjamma	3,081	2.28	
BSP	Manne Subhadra	1,939	1.44	
IND	Kondigari Ramulu	1,840	1.36	
IND	Y. Ashok	1,289	0.95	
IND	Eagala Ramulu	1,234	0.91	
Majority		12,807	9.49	
Turnout		134,999		
CPI(M) hold		Swing		

== See also ==
- Ibrahimpatnam
- List of constituencies of Telangana Legislative Assembly
