= Sirpur Kaghaznagar railway station =

Railway station in India

Sirpur Kaghaznagar
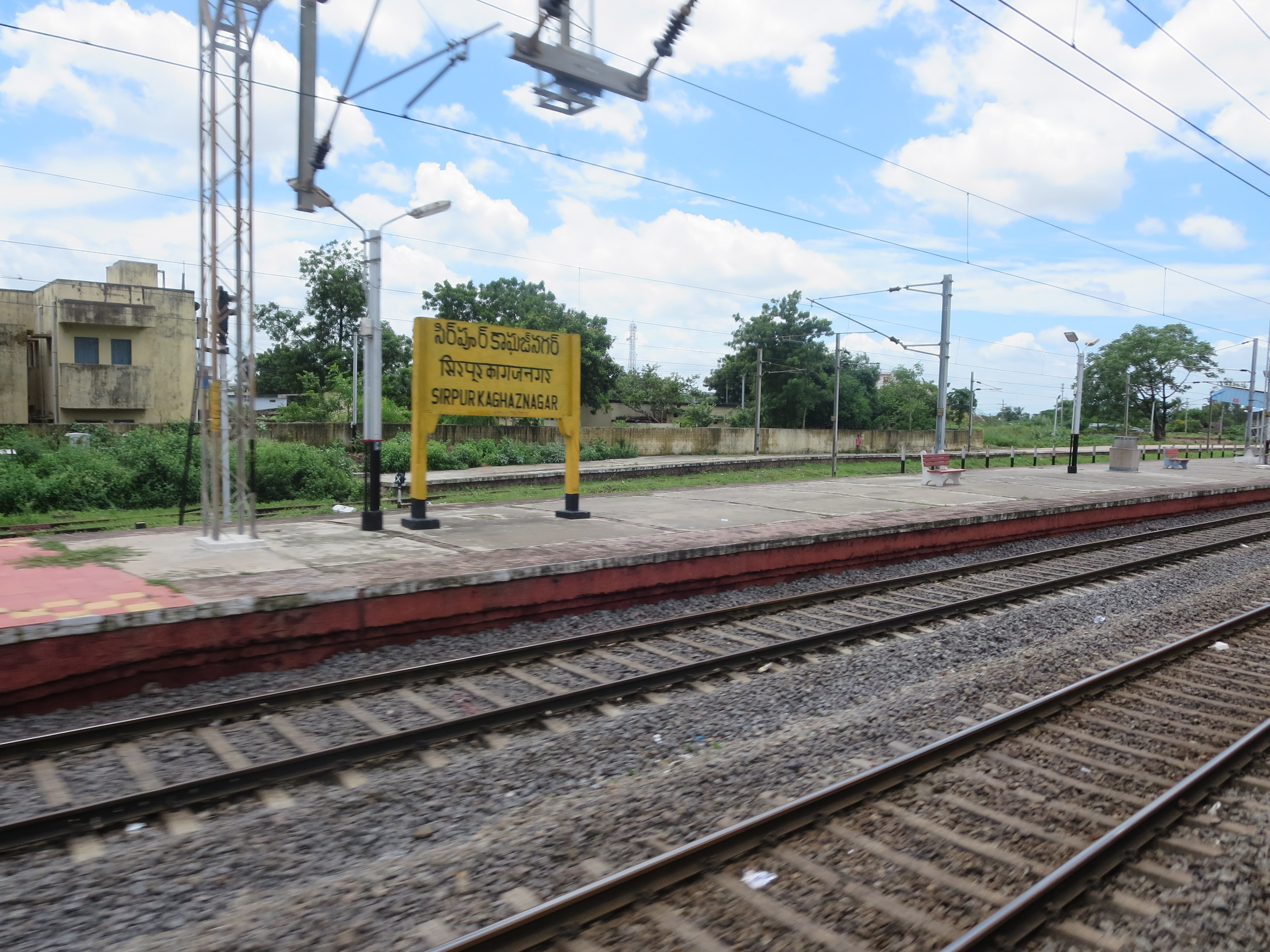

General information
- Location: India
- Coordinates: 19.3333°N 79.4833°E
- Platforms: 3
- Tracks: 6

Construction
- Parking: Available (charges apply)

Other information
- Station code: SKZR
- Fare zone: South Central Railway (SCR)
Location
- Location within Telangana Location within India

Sirpur Kaghaznagar (station code:- SKZR) is a major railway station on New Delhi–Chennai main line in the Secunderabad division of South Central Railway of the Indian Railways. It serves the Kagaznagar town in Komaram Bheem district in Telangana. Its elevation is 184 m above sea level.

It is well connected to almost all the Indian cities, such as New Delhi, Hyderabad, Bangalore, Chennai, Pune, Vishakhapatnam, Nagpur, Jabalpur, Indore, Raipur, Dhanbad, Coimbatore, Kochi, Thiruvanthapuram, Ahmedabad, Visakhapatnam, Jaipur, Surat.

There are plans to divert the SKZR railway line to Gadchiroli on the eastern side and to SKZR–Utnoor–Adilabad on the western side.

== Trains originating from SKZR ==
- Sirpur Kaghaznagar–Bidar Express (PT) (17012)
- SKZR Secundrabad Intercity EXP (12758)
- BHAGYANAGAR EXP SKZR – secundrabad(17234)
- Ramagiri MEMU Express SKZR – Kazipet (57121⇒17003)
- Karimnagar – Sirpur Town MEMU (07765)
- Singareni MEMU Express Badrachalam – Sirpur Town – Badrachalam (17033/34)

== Gallery ==
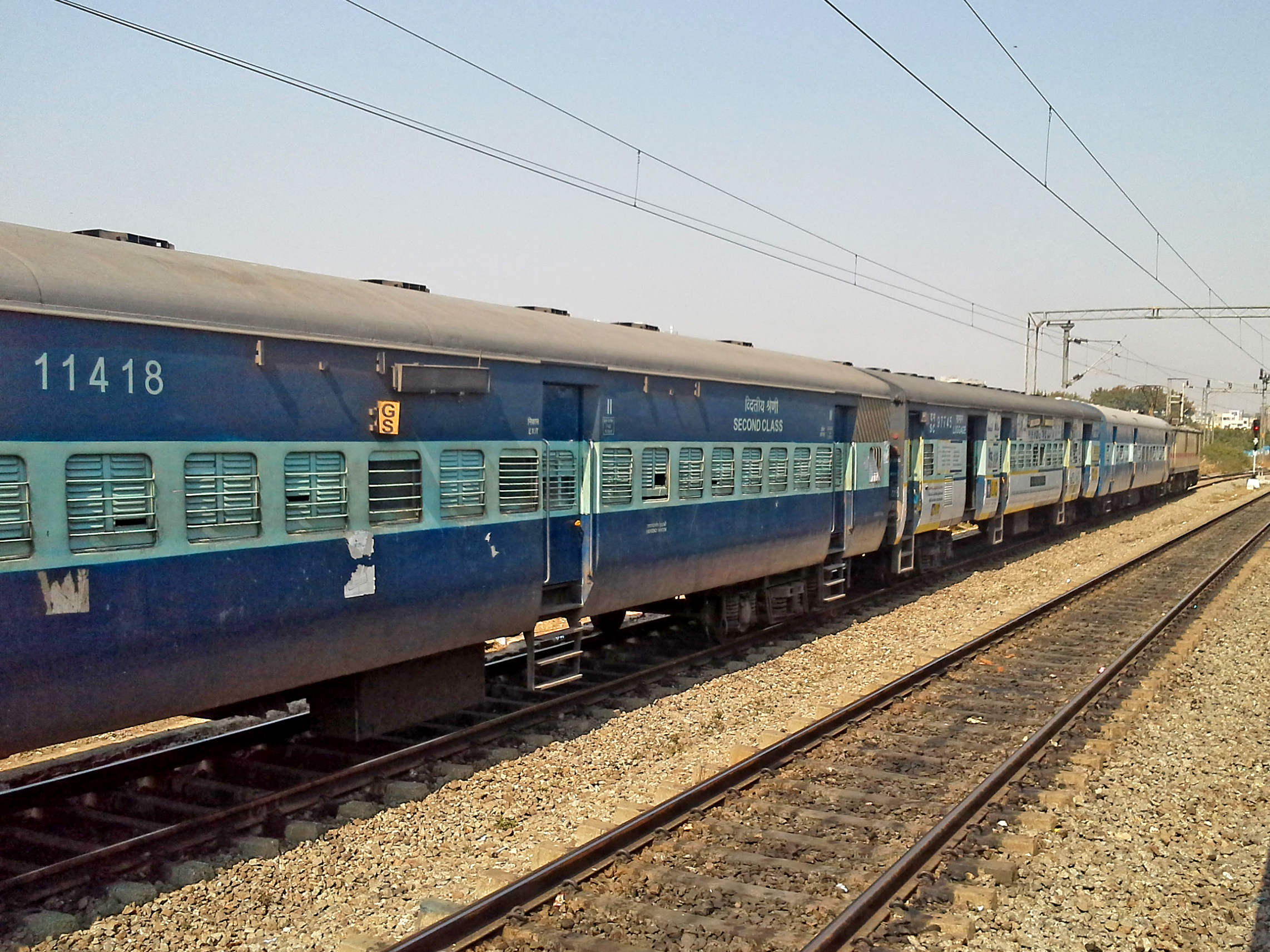
Kaghaznagar Intercity Express at Hyderabad

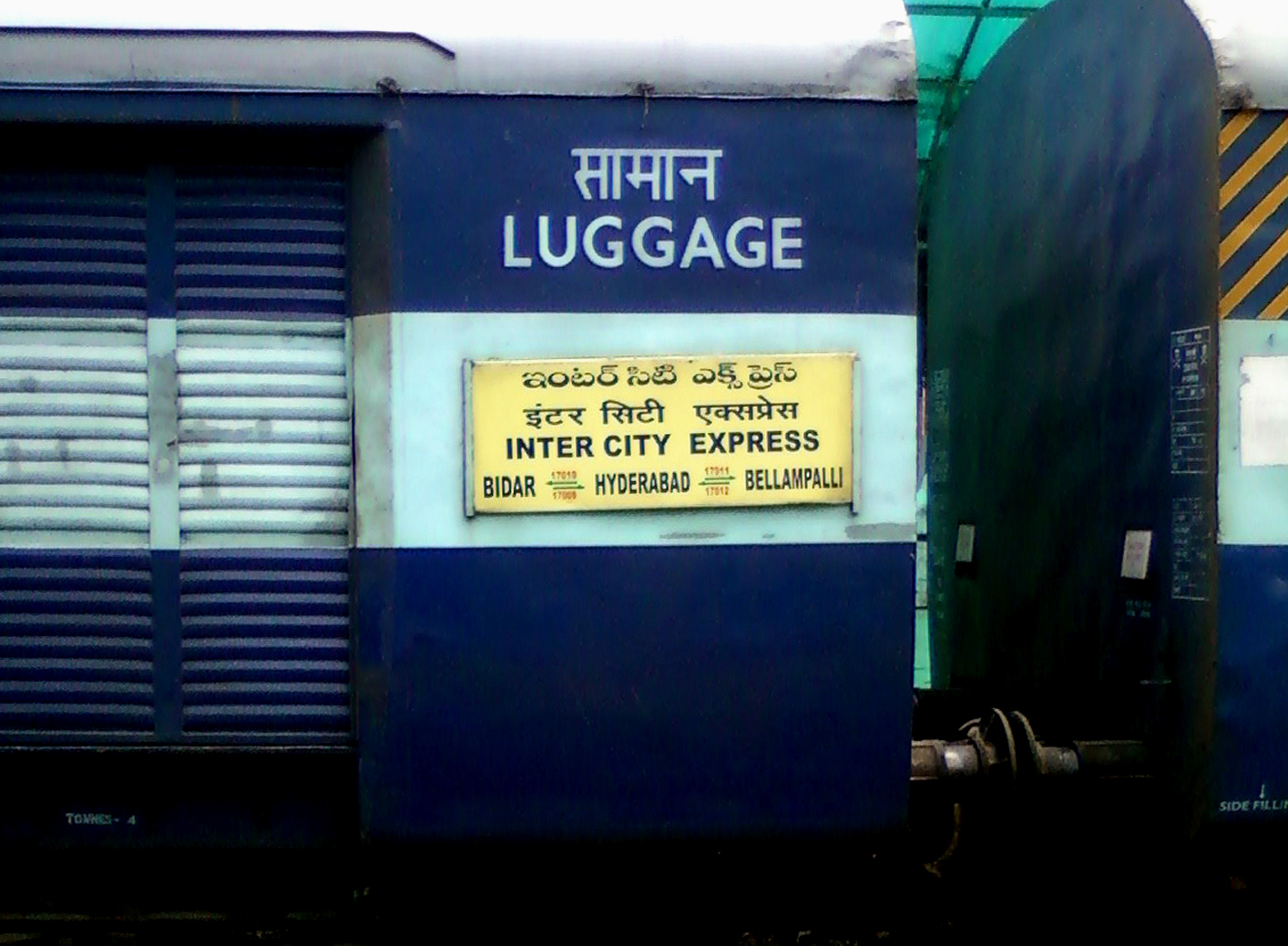
Nameboard of Belampalli Hyderabad Intercity Express

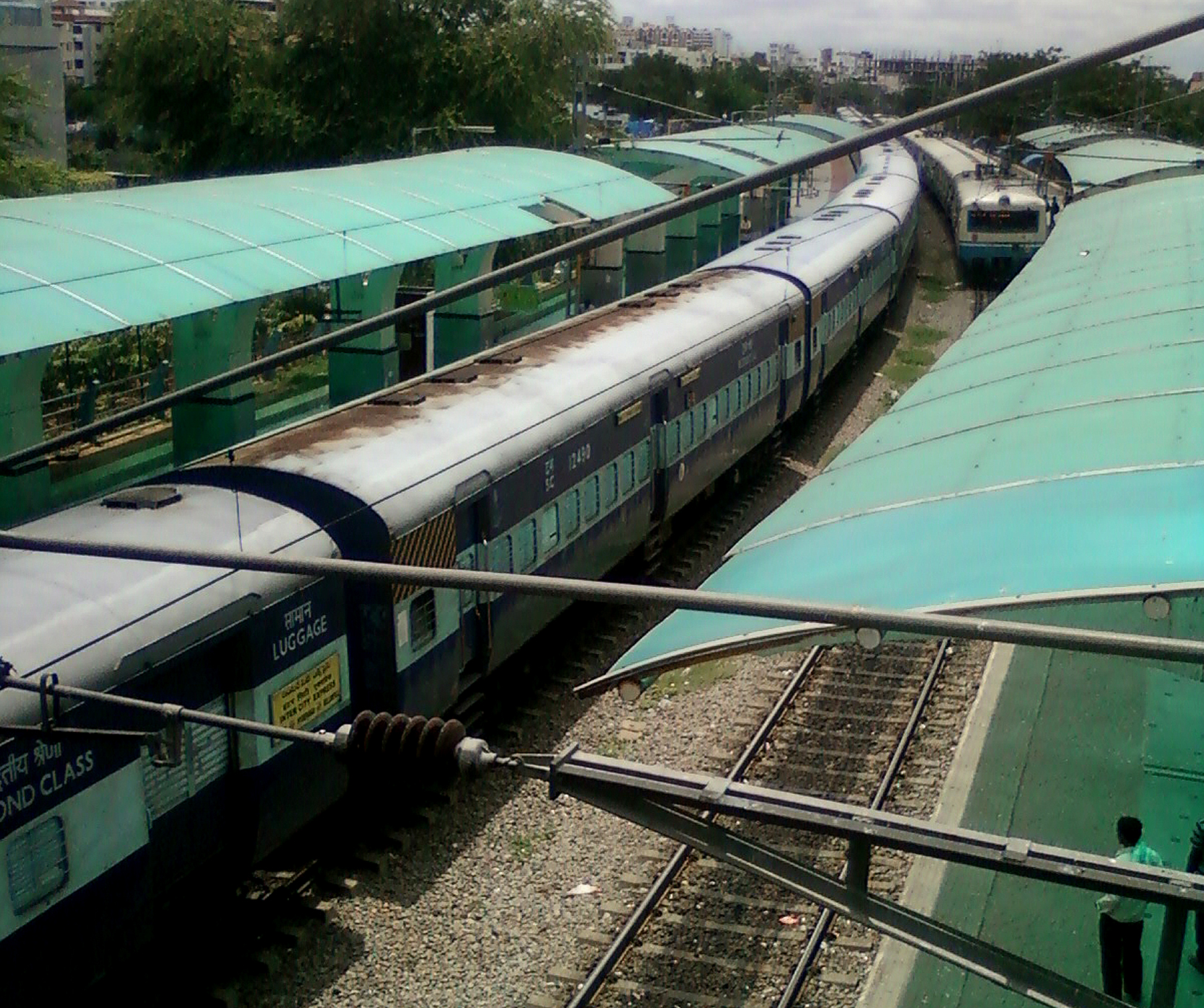
Intercity Express at Necklace Road Station

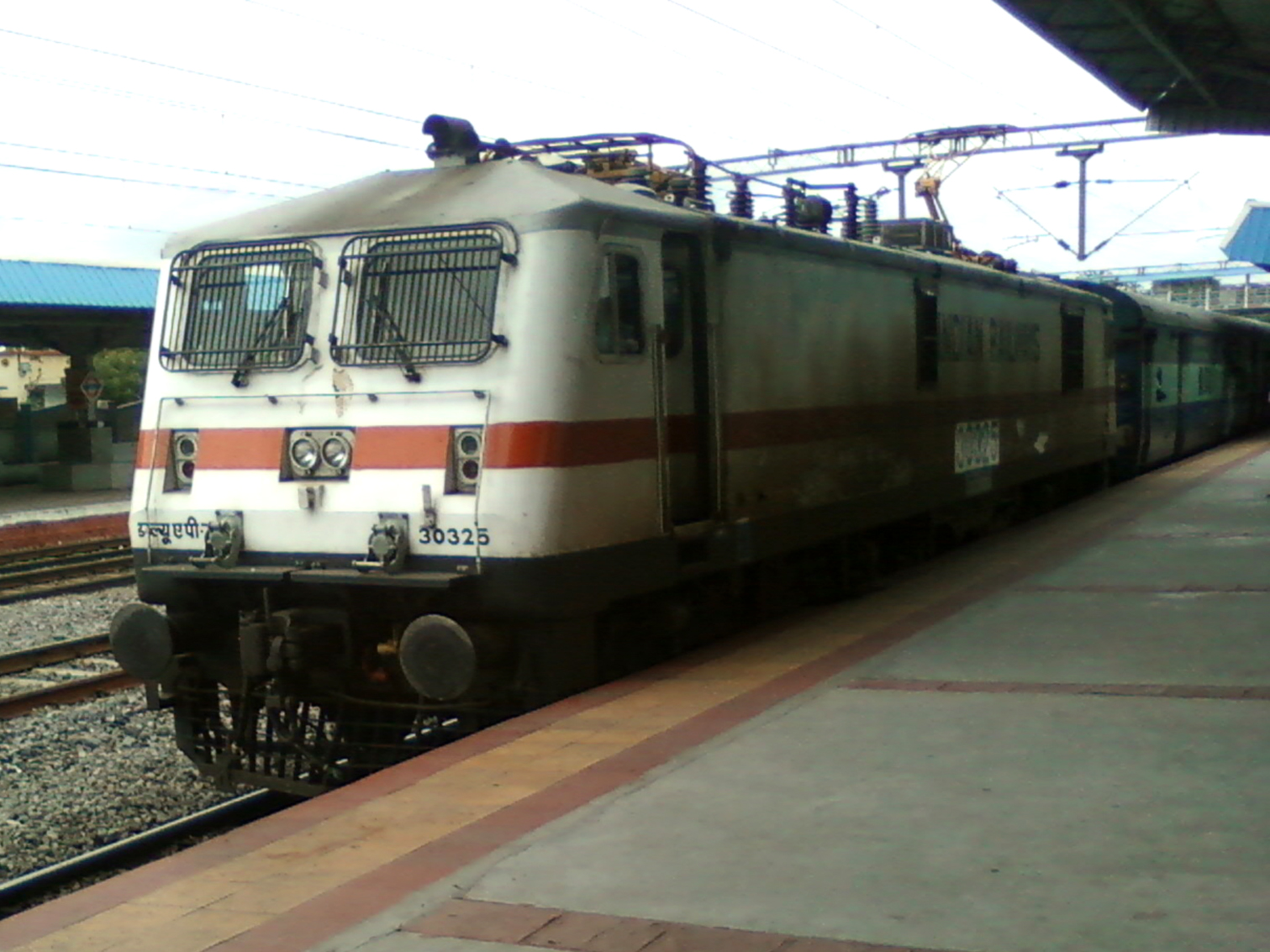
Kaghaznagar Intercity Express at Aler with a WAP7 Loco
