= Marpalli =

Village in Udupi district, Karnataka, India

Coordinates: 13°19′03″N 74°45′57″E

Marpalli ಮಾರ್ಪಳ್ಳಿ
- Village
- Country: India
- State: Karnataka
- District: Udupi

Marpalli (ಮಾರ್ಪಳ್ಳಿ) is a village in Korangrapady, in the Udupi district of Karnataka, India. It is the site of the Sri Mahalingeshwara Mahaganapathi Temple.

== Sri Mahalingeshwara Temple ==
The Sri Mahalingeshwara Mahaganapathi Temple is a Hindu temple associated with Shiva and Ganesha. Udayavani has featured it as part of the publication's temple series.

The temple holds an annual jatra. News Karnataka reported that the February 2026 festival included religious ceremonies, daytime and nighttime chariot processions, a community meal, a cultural programme by local schoolchildren, and a Yakshagana performance by the Marpalli Mahalingeshwara Yakshagana Kalamandali.
