= Lingampally, Ranga Reddy district =

Lingampally
- Village
- Country: India
- State: Telangana
- District: Ranga Reddy
- Mandal: Manchal

Government
  - Body: Mandal Office

Population (2011)
  - Total: 1,459

Languages
  - Official: Telugu
- Time zone: UTC+5:30 (IST)
- Vehicle registration: TS
- Vidhan Sabha constituency: lingampally
- Planning agency: Panchayat
- Civic agency: Mandal Office
- Website: telangana.gov.in

Lingampally is a village and panchayat in Ranga Reddy district, Telangana, India. It falls under Manchal mandal.

In the 2011 census, 1,459 people were recorded as living in Lingampally, in 365 houses. 743 of those people were male, and 716 female. The literacy rate was 67.04%. A total of 212 belonged to Scheduled Castes and 4 to Scheduled Tribes.
