= Manchal Village =

Manchala
- Village
- Nickname: A Manchal
- Location in Panipat, haryana, India Manchala (India)
- Coordinates: 17.1628°N 78.7236°E
- Country: India
- State: Telangana
- District: Rangareddy
- Mandal: Manchal
- Founder: Pawan Manchal
- Elevation: 556 m (1,824 ft)

Population (2011)
  - Total: 4,507

Languages
  - Official: Telugu
- Time zone: UTC+5:30 (IST)
- Postal code: 132103
- Website: amanchal.com

Manchala is a village and panchayat in Ranga Reddy district, Telangana, India. It falls under Manchal mandal. It is located nearly 45km towards South-East from MGBS bus station. It comes under Ibrahimpatnam revenue division.

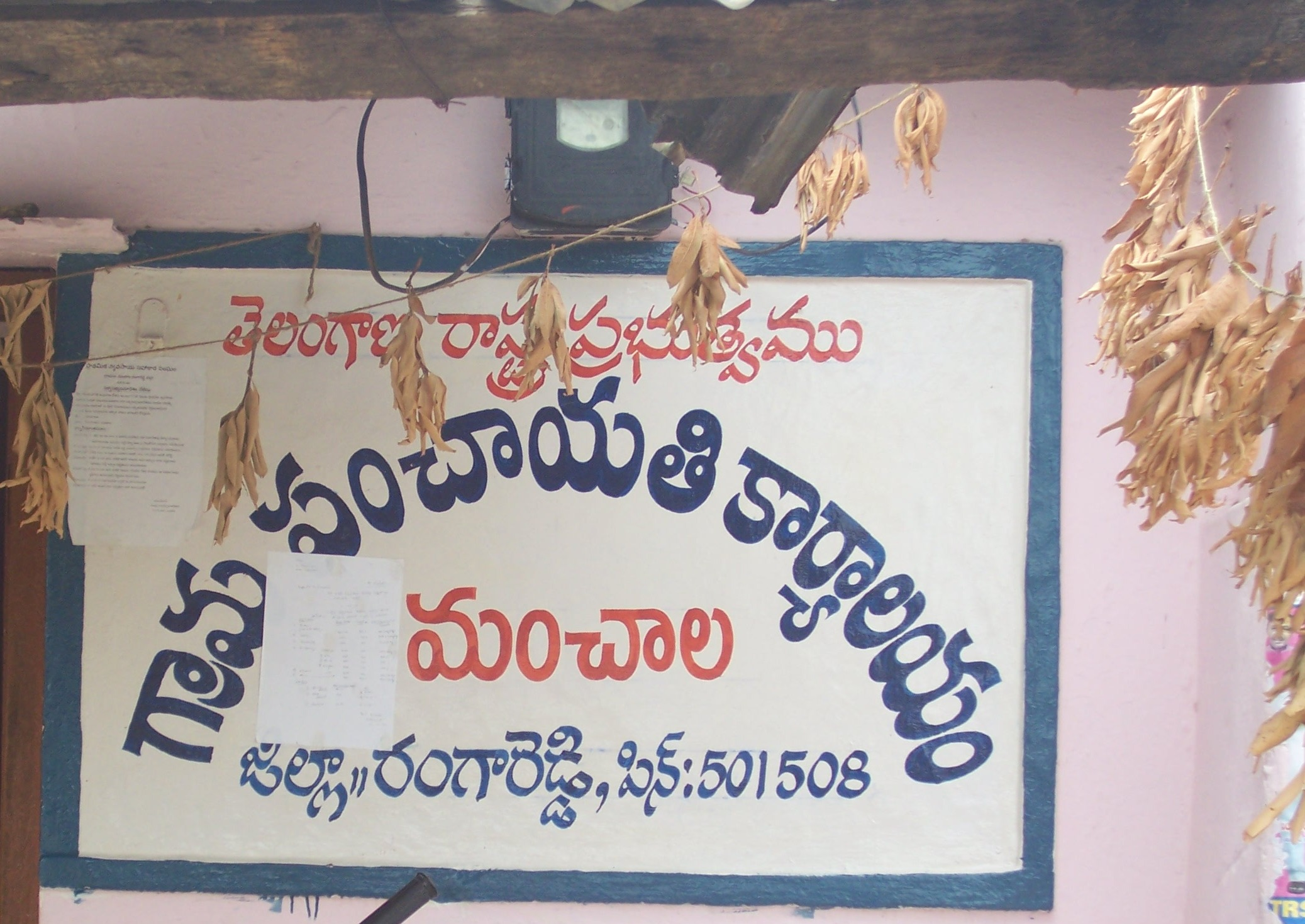
Gram panchayat office, at Manchala village

In the 2011 census, 4,507 people were recorded as living in Manchal, in 1,060 houses. 2,142 of those people were male, and 2,365 female. The literacy rate was 64.24%. A total of 1,101 belonged to Scheduled Castes and 240 to Scheduled Tribes.
