= Hundry Express =

Train in India

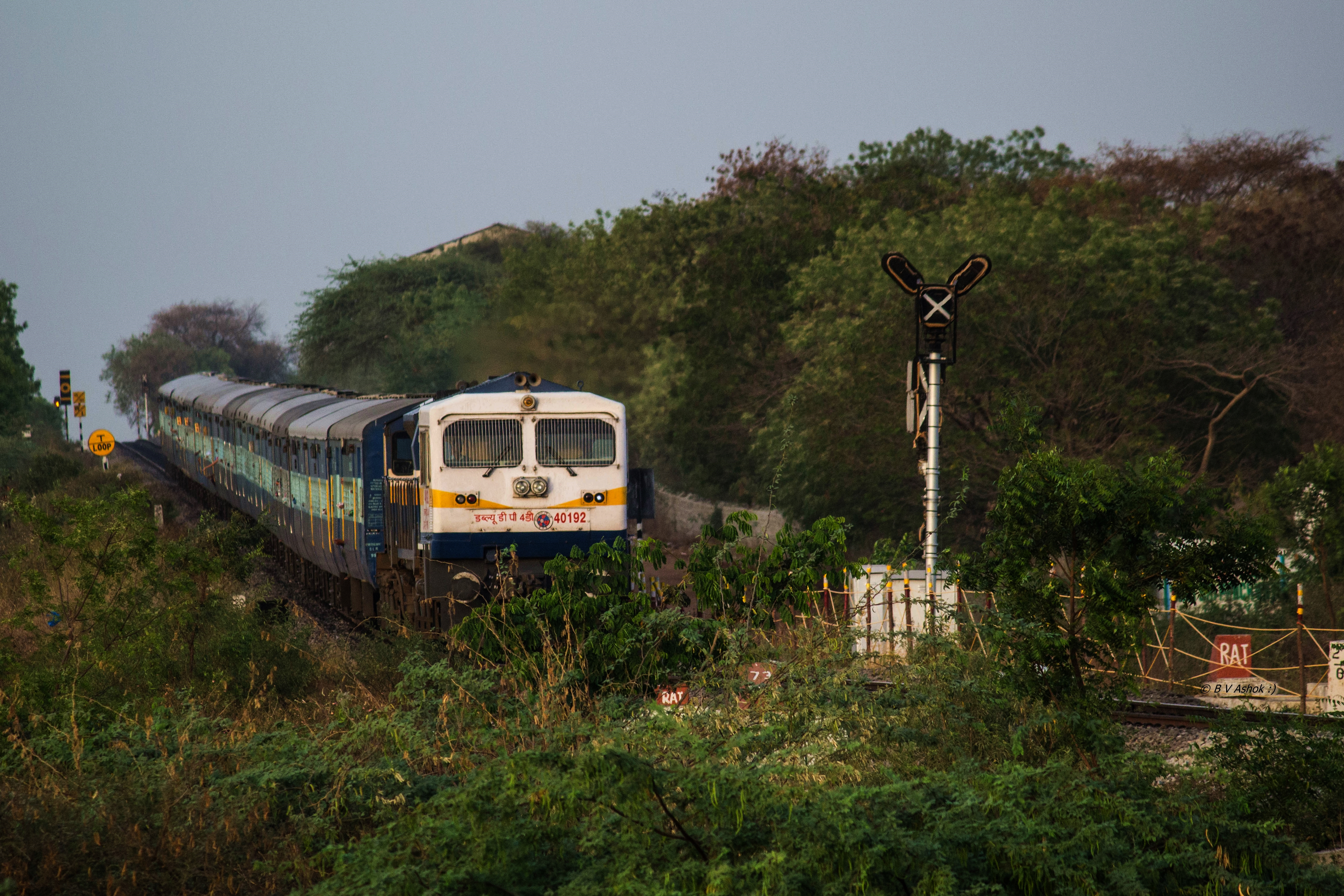
- Gooty based WDP-4D descending down the gradient towards Umdanagar with Hundry Express.

Overview
- Service type: Express
- Locale: Telangana & Andhra Pradesh
- First service: 25 June 2013; 12 years ago
- Current operator: South Central Railway

Route
- Termini: Hyderabad Deccan (HYB); Kurnool City (KRNT)
- Stops: 13
- Distance travelled: 253 km (157 mi)
- Average journey time: 5 hours 15 minutes
- Service frequency: Daily
- Train number: 17027 / 17028

On-board services
- Classes: General Unreserved, AC Chair Car, Second Class Seating
- Seating arrangements: Yes
- Sleeping arrangements: No
- Catering facilities: On-board catering, E-catering
- Observation facilities: Large windows
- Baggage facilities: No
- Other facilities: Below the seats

Technical
- Rolling stock: ICF coach
- Track gauge: 1,676 mm (5 ft 6 in)
- Operating speed: 48 km/h (30 mph) average including halts.
Route map
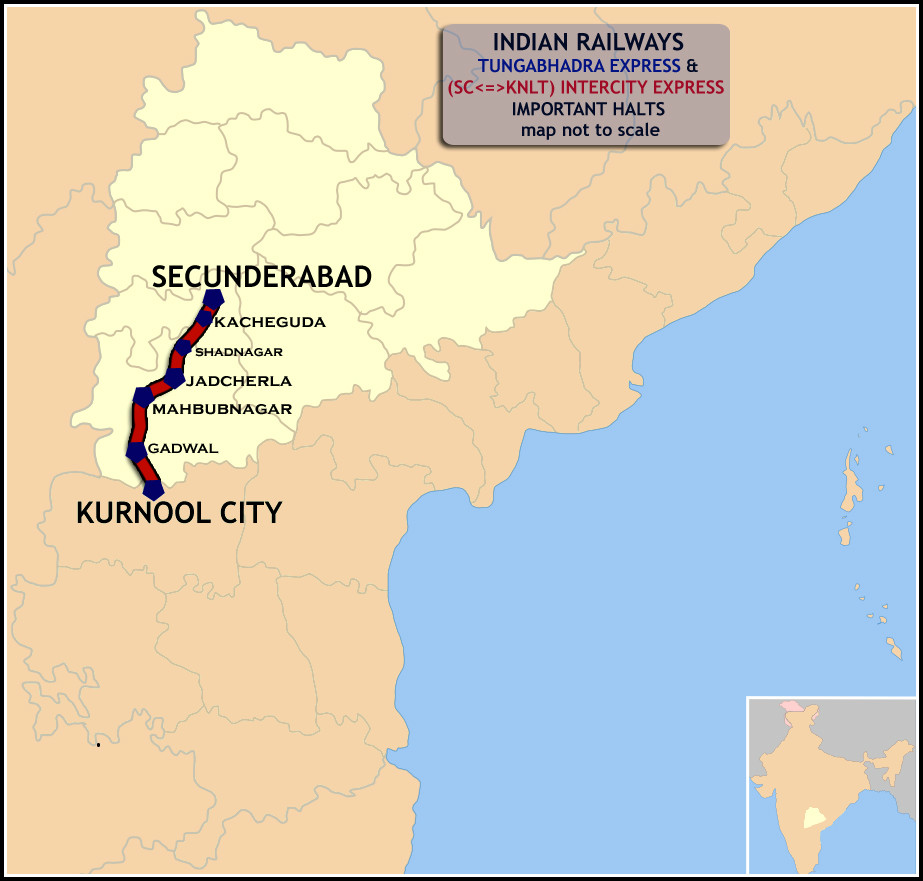

The 17027 / 17028 Hundry Express is an Express train belonging to Indian Railways South Central Railway zone that runs between Hyderabad Deccan and Kurnool City in India.

It operates as train number 17027 from Hyderabad Deccan to Kurnool City and as train number 17028 in the reverse direction serving the states of Telangana & Andhra Pradesh.

== Coaches ==
The 17027 / 28 Hundry Express has 15 general unreserved (Now 2S), One AC Chair Car & two SLR (seating with luggage rake) coaches . It does not carry a pantry car.

As is customary with most train services in India, coach composition may be amended at the discretion of Indian Railways depending on demand.

== Service ==
The 17027 Secunderabad Junction–Kurnool City Hundry Express covers the distance of 253 km (157 mi) in 5 hours 15 mins (48 km/h) and in 6 hours 10 mins as the 17028 Kurnool City–Secunderabad Junction Hundry Express (41 km/h).

As the average speed of the train is lower than 55 km/h (34 mph), as per railway rules, its fare doesn't includes a Superfast surcharge.

== Routing ==
The 17027 / 28 Hundry Express runs from Hyderabad Deccan via Kacheguda, Gadwal to Kurnool City.

== Traction ==
Earlier was Gooty-based WDP-4. As the route is fully electrified, a Vijayawada Loco Shed-based WAP-4 electric locomotive pulls the train to its destination.
