= Ratnachal Express =

Train in India

Overview
- Service type: Superfast Express
- Locale: Andhra Pradesh
- First service: 2 October 1994; 31 years ago
- Current operator: South Coast Railway

Route
- Termini: Vijayawada (BZA); Visakhapatnam (VSKP)
- Stops: 11
- Distance travelled: 350 km (217 mi)
- Average journey time: 6 hours 15 minutes
- Service frequency: Daily
- Train number: 12717 / 12718

On-board services
- Classes: AC Chair Car, Second Class Seating, General Coaches
- Seating arrangements: Yes
- Sleeping arrangements: No
- Auto-rack arrangements: Overhead racks
- Catering facilities: Available
- Observation facilities: Large windows
- Baggage facilities: No
- Other facilities: Below the seats

Technical
- Rolling stock: LHB coach
- Track gauge: Broad Gauge; 1,676 mm (5 ft 6 in)
- Operating speed: 58 km/h (36 mph) average including halts.
Route map
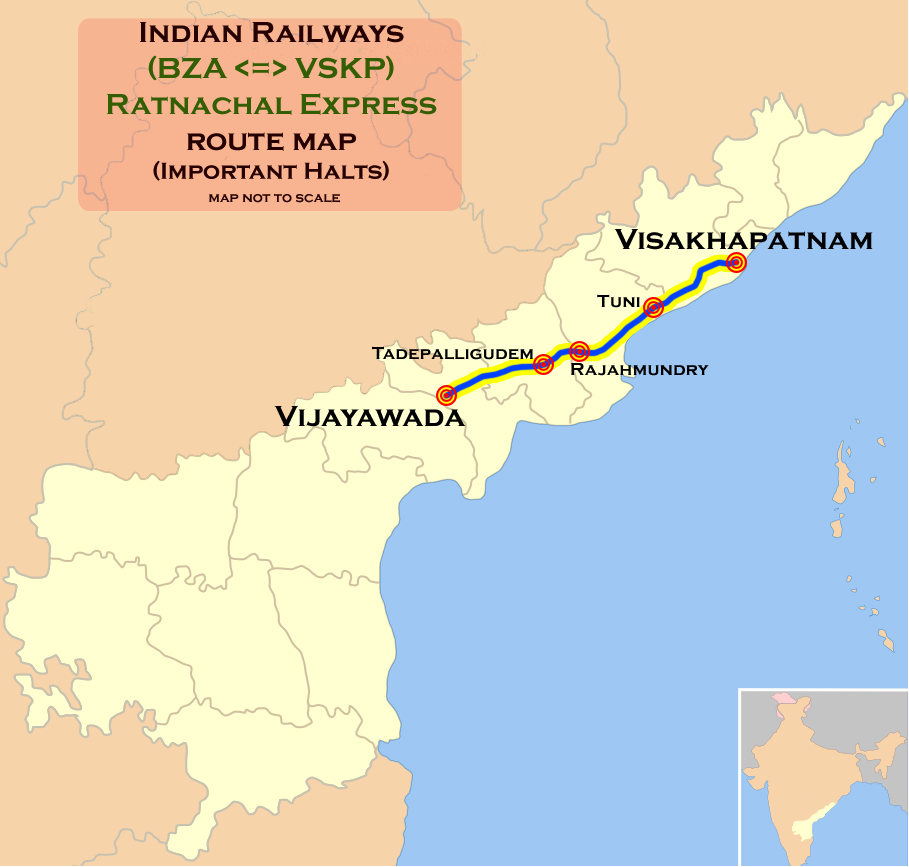

The 12717 / 12718 Ratnachal Express is a daily superfast intercity express train that runs between Vijayawada Junction and Visakhapatnam Junction in Andhra Pradesh. This train belongs to Vijayawada Division of South Coast Railway zone.

== Halting stations ==
The Ratnachal Express covers the distance of 349 km in 6 hours as 12717 Ratnachal Express averaging 59 km/h. As it runs above 55 km/h, it has superfast surcharge. This train halts at Nuzvid, Eluru, Tadepalligudem, Nidadavolu, Rajahmundry, Anaparti, Samalkot, Annavaram, Tuni, Anakapalli, Duvvada.

== Gallery ==
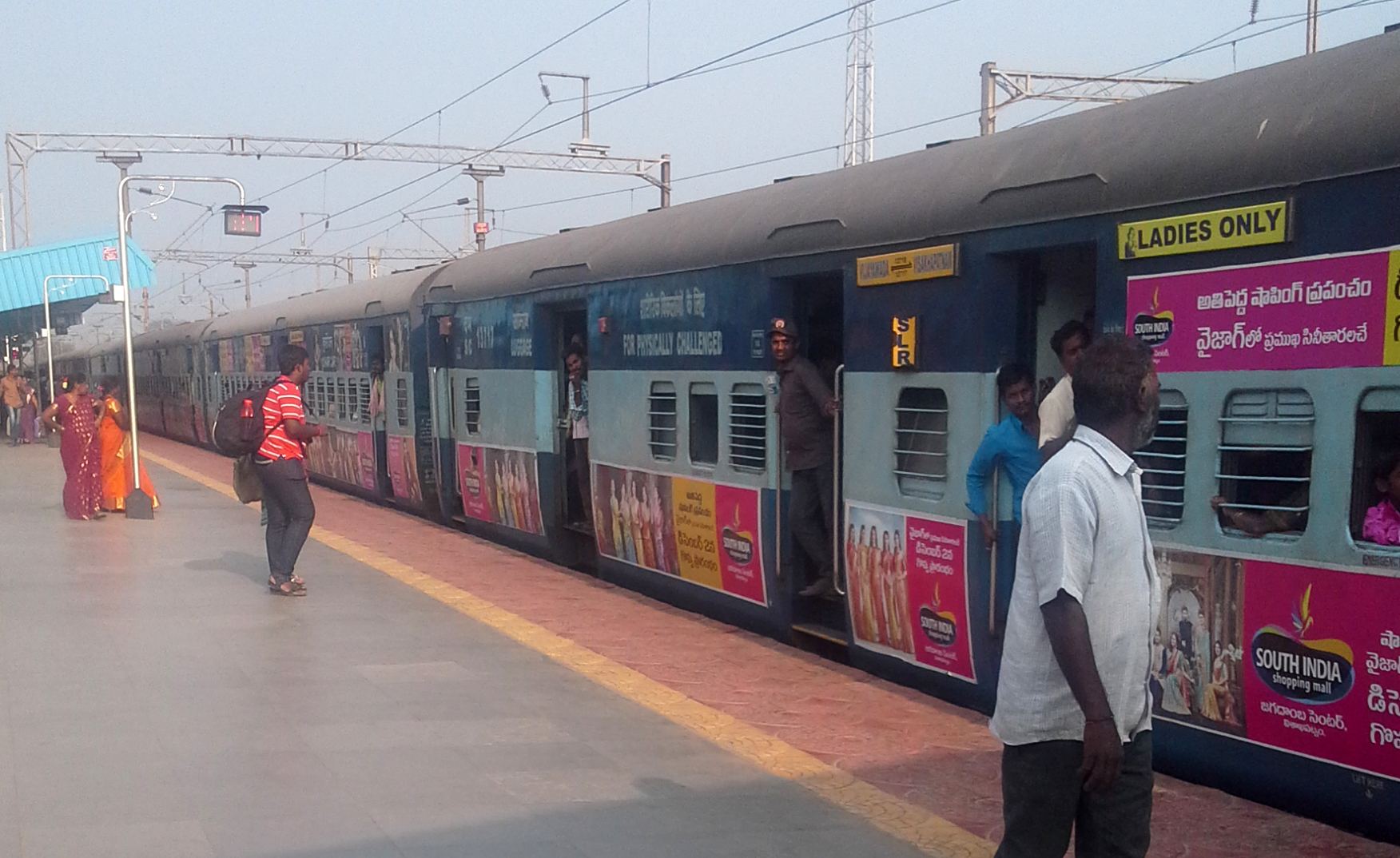
Vijayawada bound Ratnachal Express at Samalkot

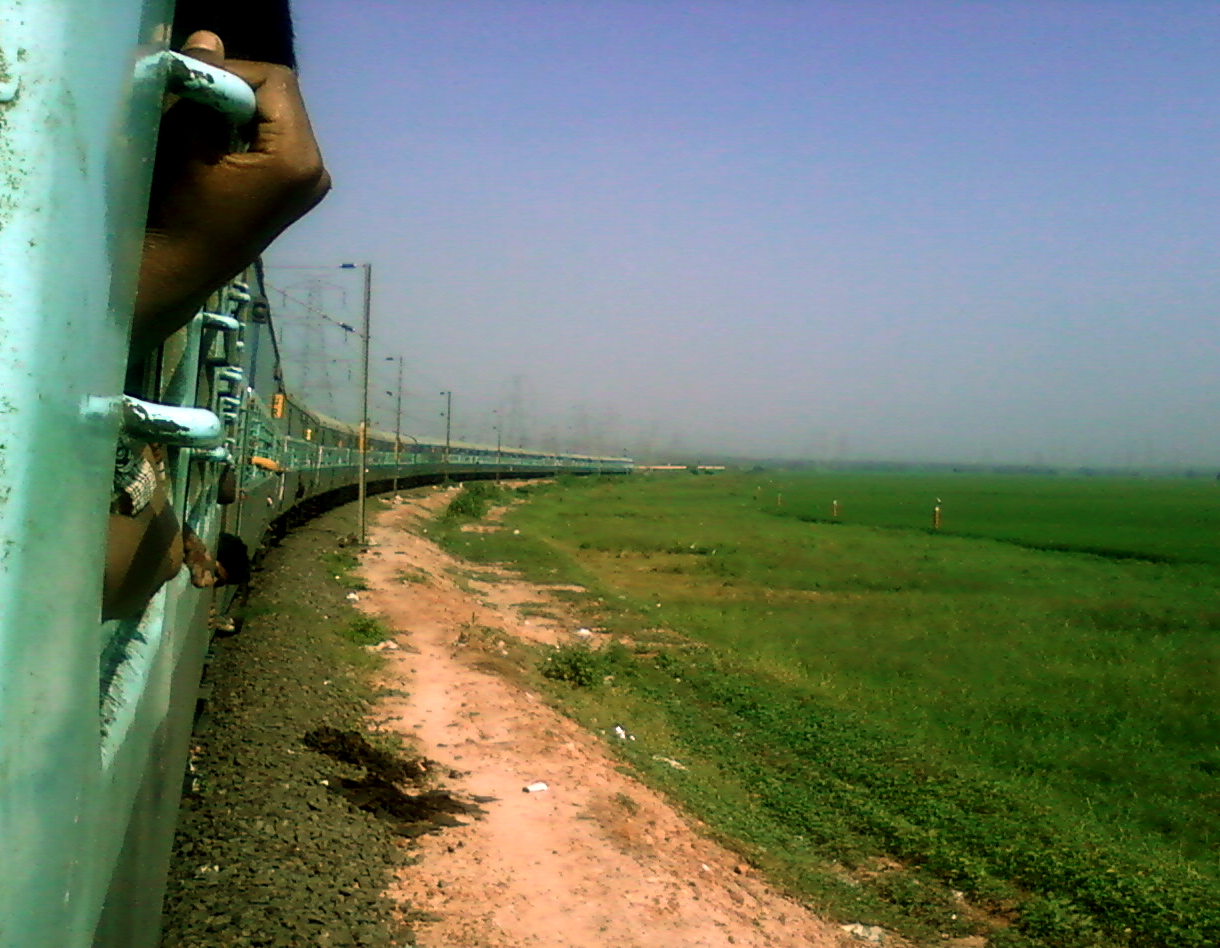
Visakhapatnam bound Ratnachal express at Rajahmundry

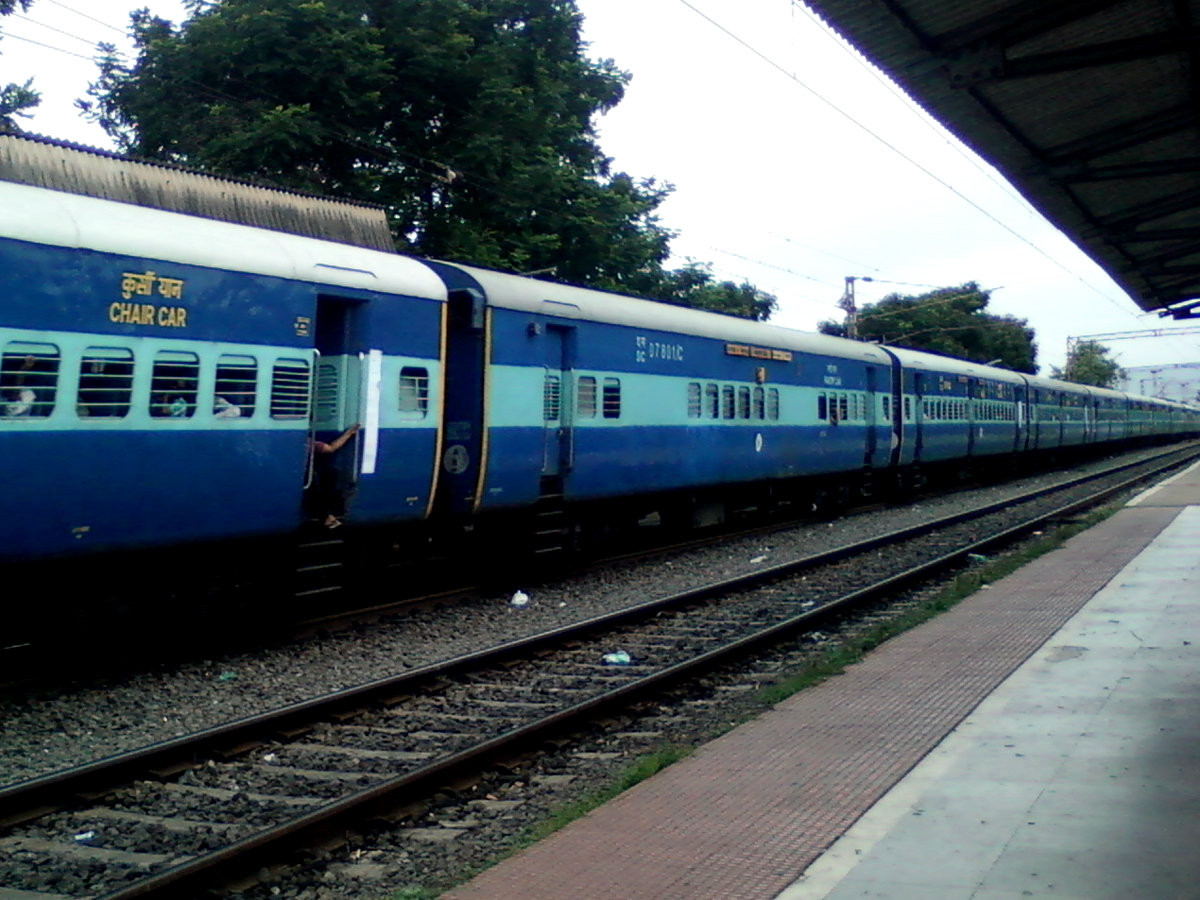
Vijayawada bound Ratnachal Express at Marripalem

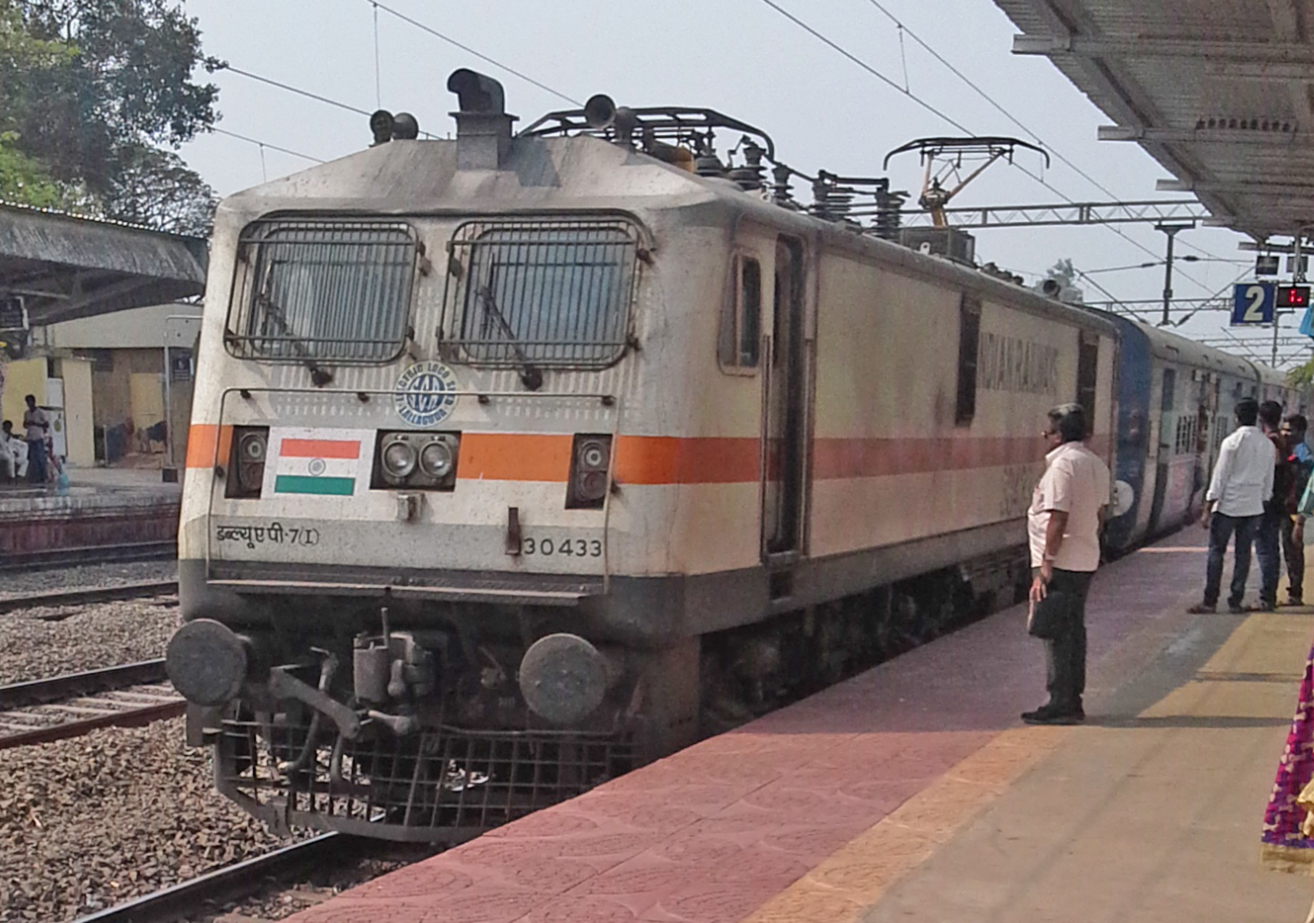
Visakhapatnam bound Ratnachal Express at Tuni

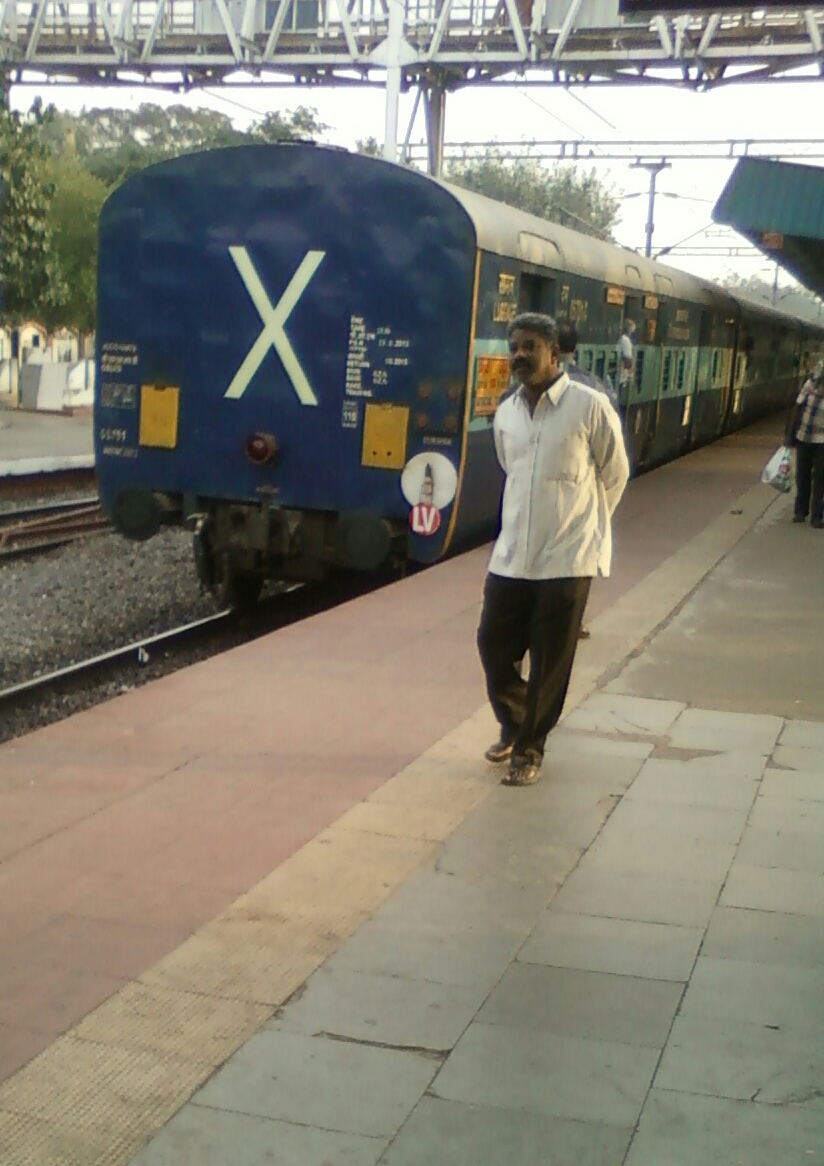
Visakhapatnam bound Ratnachal Express at Eluru

== Coach Composition ==
From Vijayawada to Visakhapatnam (12718)
It runs with LHB coaches (Green indicating Electric locomotive, Yellow indicating colour of the general coaches, Pink indicating reserved coaches, Blue indicating AC coaches)

Loco	1	2	3	4	5	6	7	8	9	10	11	12	13	14	15	16	17	18	19	20	21	22	23
	EoG	UR	UR	UR	UR	UR	UR	D1	D2	D3	D4	D5	D6	PC	D7	D8	C1	C2	C3	UR	UR	UR	SLRD

From Visakhapatnam to Vijayawada(12717)
It runs with LHB coaches (Green indicating Electric locomotive, Yellow indicating colour of the general coaches, Pink indicating reserved coaches, Blue indicating AC coaches)

Loco	1	2	3	4	5	6	7	8	9	10	11	12	13	14	15	16	17	18	19	20	21	22	23
	SLRD	UR	UR	UR	C3	C2	C1	D8	D7	PC	D6	D5	D4	D3	D2	D1	UR	UR	UR	UR	UR	UR	EoG
