= Pinakini Express =

Train in India

Overview
- Service type: Superfast Express
- Locale: Andhra Pradesh & Tamil Nadu
- First service: 1 July 1992; 33 years ago
- Current operator: South Coast Railway

Route
- Termini: Vijayawada Junction (BZA); MGR Chennai Central (MAS)
- Stops: 12
- Distance travelled: 431 km (268 mi)
- Average journey time: 6 hours 50 minutes
- Service frequency: Daily
- Train number: 12711 / 12712

On-board services
- Classes: AC Chair Car, 3AC Economy, Second Class Seating, General Unreserved
- Seating arrangements: Yes
- Sleeping arrangements: No
- Auto-rack arrangements: Overhead racks
- Catering facilities: Pantry Car, On-board Catering, E-Catering
- Observation facilities: Large windows
- Baggage facilities: No
- Other facilities: Below the seats

Technical
- Rolling stock: LHB coach
- Track gauge: Broad Gauge; 1,676 mm (5 ft 6 in)
- Operating speed: 62 km/h (39 mph) average with halts
Route map
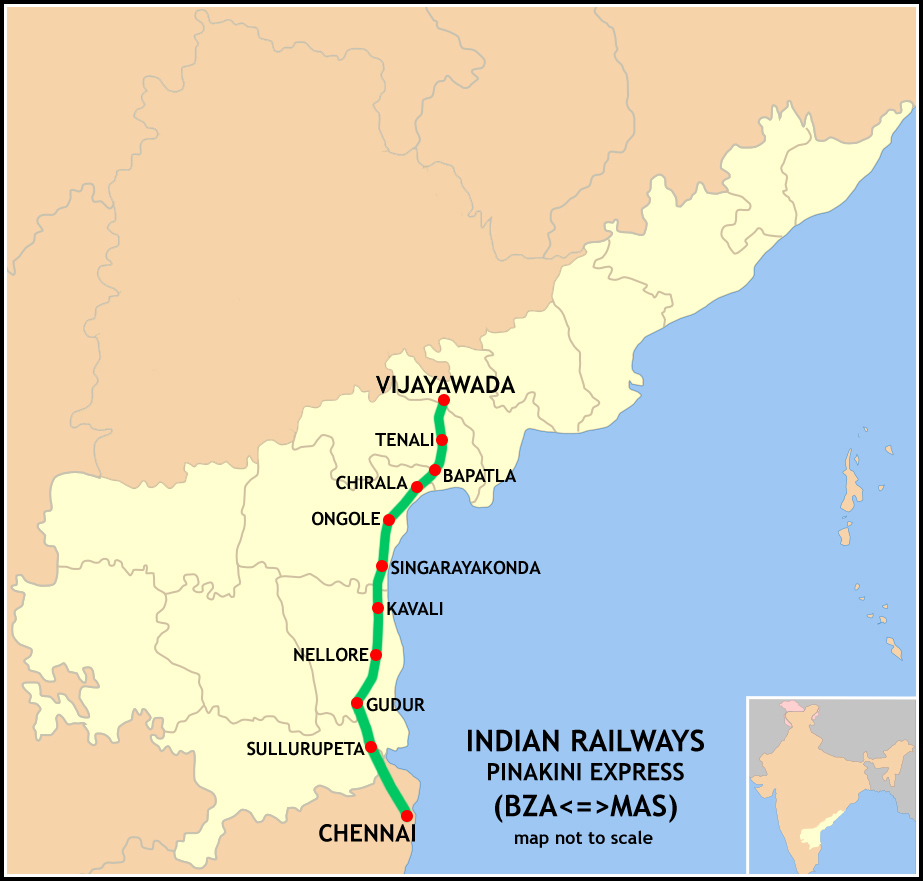

The 12711 / 12722 Pinakini Express is a superfast express train that runs between Vijayawada Junction in Andhra Pradesh and M. G . R Chennai Central in Tamil Nadu. This train belongs to Vijayawada Division of South Coast Railway zone.

== History ==
The train, which began its services in 1991, between Vijayawada and Chennai developed a unique bond between the people of Andhra Pradesh and Tamil Nadu.

Pinakini Intercity Express, which derived its name from Penna or Pinakini River passing through Nellore City which lies between Chennai and Vijayawada.

This is the best train to reach Chennai in a short duration of time comfortably. Thousands of passengers prefer this train due to its convenient timings and its connectivity towards down South.

This train travels 430 km on each side and consists of 12 halts in between. Pinakini Express enjoys amazing patronage and its occupancy rate is more than 100 per cent throughout the year. Many employees, students, season ticket holders of Krishna, Guntur, Prakasam and Nellore districts daily choose this train as the safest means to travel to their workplaces and destinations due to its convenient timings and best punctuality performance.

Initially the train consisted of 18 coaches, later coaches were increased to 24 due to heavy demand. Pinakini Express has single standard ICF rake and is being primarily maintained at Vijayawada since its inception. It has three AC Chair Car coaches, nine reserved and nine unreserved non-AC coaches, pantry car and two SLR (Seating-cum-Luggage Rake) coaches. The rake was upgraded with safer CBC (Central Buffer Coupler) coupling by replacing old screw coupling as a measure of enhanced safety. It also equipped with bio toilets and OBHS staff for on board cleaning during the journey.

== Gallery ==
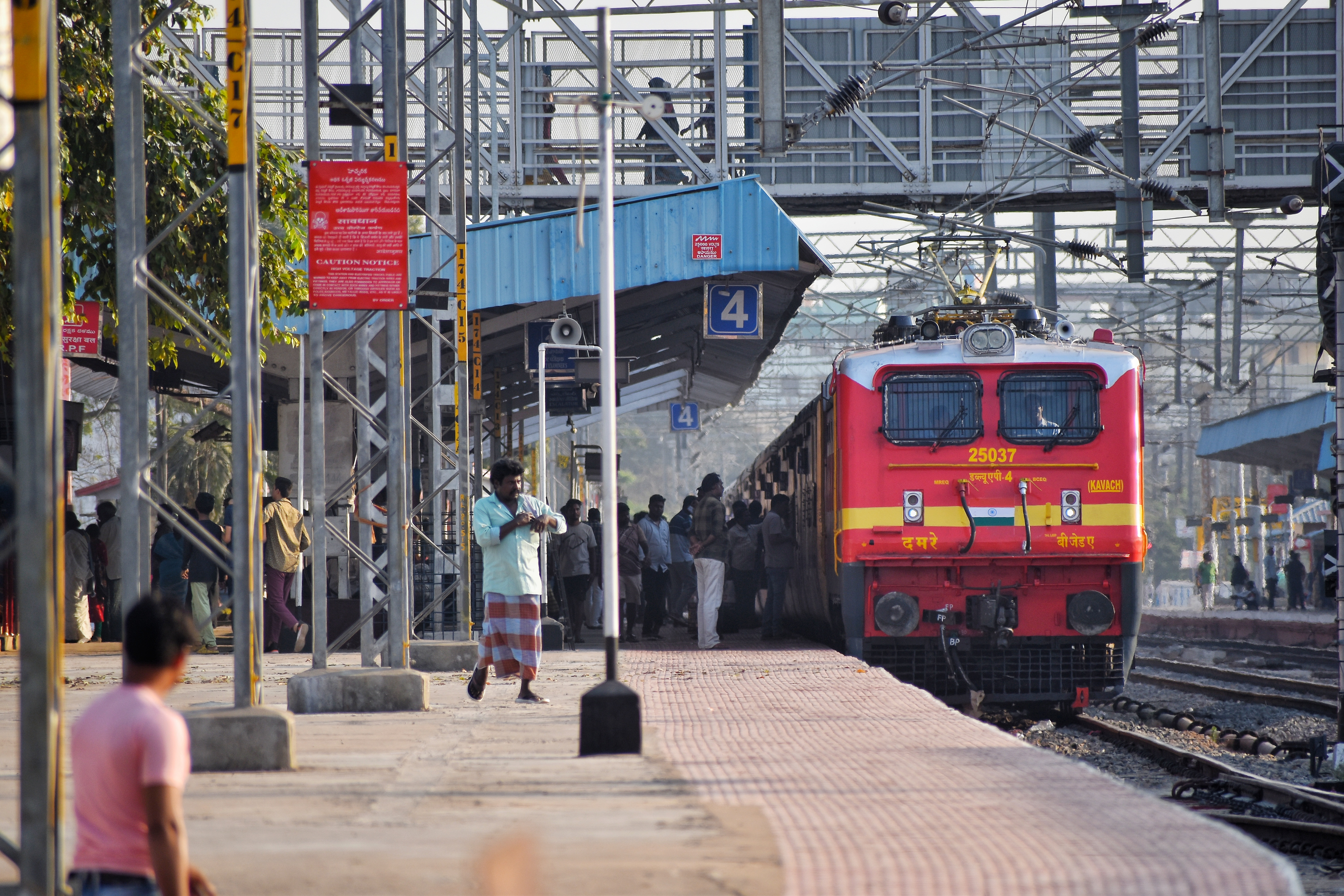
Pinakini Express at Nellore

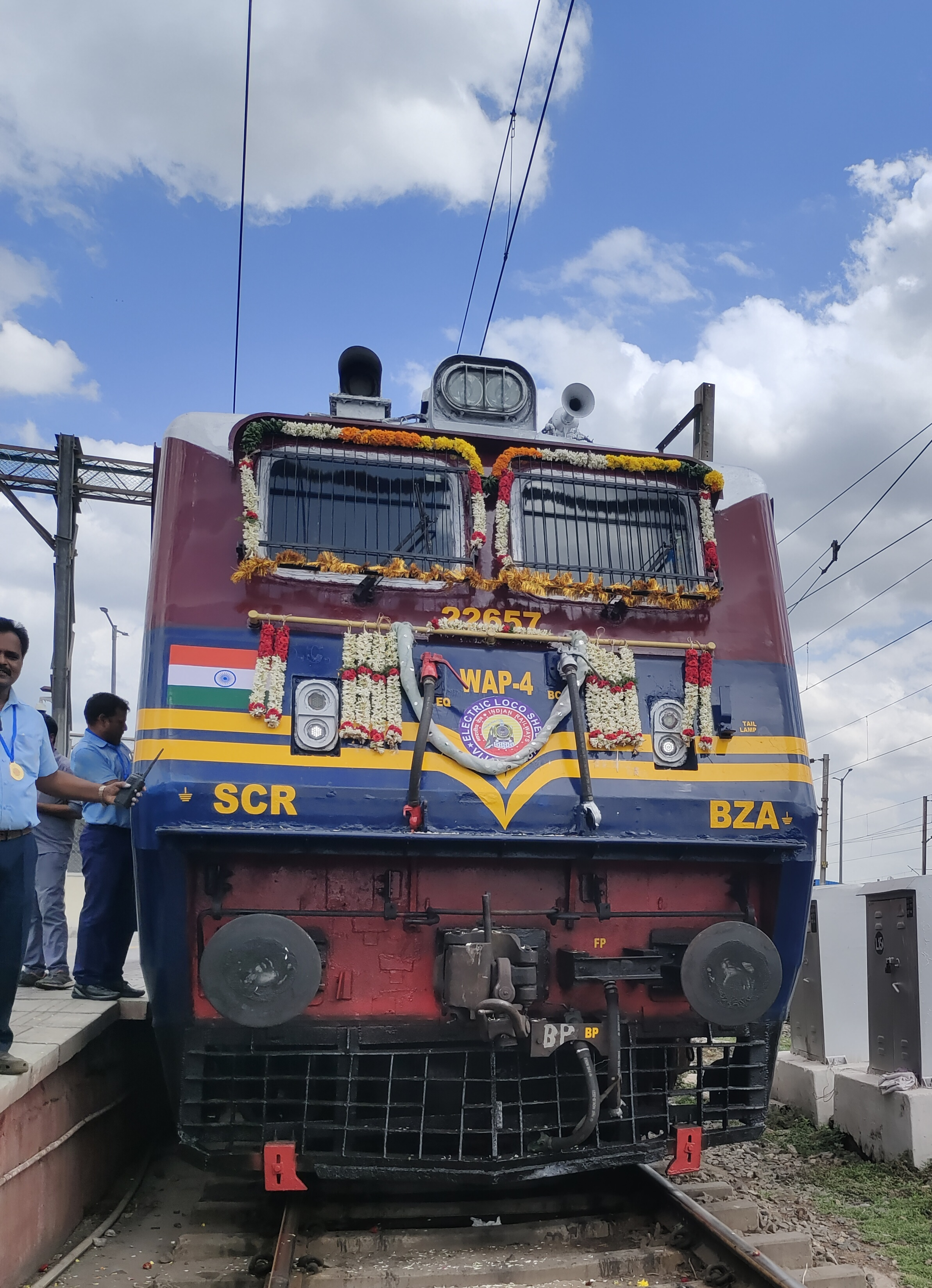
Pinakini Express 30th Birthday Celebrations in 2022 July

== Traction and coach composition ==
It is hauled by a Lallaguda-based WAP-7 and Vijayawada-based WAP-7 locomotive. Coach composition of Pinakini Express
From Vijayawada to Chennai (12711)
It runs with LHB coaches (Green indicating Electric locomotive, Yellow indicating colour of the general coaches, pink indicating reserved coaches and blue indicating AC coaches)

Loco	1	2	3	4	5	6	7	8	9	10	11	12	13	14	15	16	17	18	19	20	21	22	23	24
	EoG	UR	UR	UR	UR	UR	C1	C2	M1	D1	D2	D3	D4	PC	D5	D6	D7	D8	UR	UR	UR	UR	UR	SLR

From Chennai to Vijayawada(12712)
It runs with LHB coaches (Green indicating Electric locomotive, Yellow indicating colour of the general coaches, pink indicating reserved coaches and blue indicating AC coaches)

Loco	1	2	3	4	5	6	7	8	9	10	11	12	13	14	15	16	17	18	19	20	21	22	23	24
	SLR	UR	UR	UR	UR	UR	D8	D7	D6	D5	PC	D4	D3	D2	D1	M1	C2	C1	UR	UR	UR	UR	UR	EoG

== Achievements ==
Pinakini Express is the first train in the south India to get a green toilet.

== See also ==
- Krishna Express
- Express trains in India
- Jan Shatabdi Express
