= Dedicated Intercity trains of India =

This article seeks to list all the trains that ply between two cities in India. The trains listed in the set of cities must be the originating & terminating cities respectively.

Only Cities with more than one train between them to be listed.

== Ahmedabad–Chennai ==
- 12655/56 Navjeevan Express
- 22919/20 Chennai–Ahmedabad Humsafar Express
- 19419/19 Chennai Central–Ahmedabad Express(Chennai Express)
- 20953/54 Ahmedabad–Chennai Central express

== Ahmedabad–Kolkata ==
- 12833/34 Howrah–Ahmedabad Superfast Express
- 19413/14 Ahmedabad–Kolkata Express(Sare Jahan Se Achchha Express)

== Ahmedabad–Darbhanga ==
- 19165/66 Ahmedabad–Darbhanga Sabarmati Express
- 15559/60 Darbhanga–Ahmedabad Antyodaya Express
- 09465/66 Ahmedabad–Darbhanga Clone Special

== Ahmedabad–Agra ==
- 12547/12548 Agra Cantt–Sabarmati BG Superfast Express
- 04165/66 Agra Cantt – Ahmedabad SF Special Fare
- 04167/68 Agra Cantt – Ahmedabad SF Special Fare

== Ahmedabad–Jodhpur ==
- 14819/20 BGKT–Sabarmati Intercity Express
- 14803/04 Bhagat Ki Kothi–Ahmedabad Weekly Express
- 14821/22 Sabarmati–Jodhpur Express

== Ahmedabad–Kevadia ==
- 20947/20948 Ekta Nagar–Ahmedabad Jan Shatabdi Express
- 20949/20950 Ekta Nagar–Ahmedabad Jan Shatabdi Express

== Ahmedabad–Patna ==
- 12947/48 Azimabad Express
- 09447/48 Ahmedabad-Patna Clone Special

== Ahmedabad–Pune ==
- 11095/96 Ahimsa Express
- 12297/98 Ahmedabad–Pune Duronto Express
- 22185/86 Ahmedabad–Pune SF Express

== Ahmedabad–Puri ==
- 12843/44 Puri–Ahmedabad Express
- 18405/06 Puri–Ahmedabad Weekly Express
- 20861/62 Ahmedabad–Puri Express

== Ahmedabad–Vadodara ==
- 19035/36 Vadodara–Ahmedabad Intercity Express
- 09495/96 Sankalp Fast Passenger

== Ahmedabad–Varanasi ==
- 19167/68 Sabarmati Express

== Chennai–Nagercoil ==
- 12667/12668 Chennai Egmore–Nagercoil Weekly Superfast Express
- 12689/12690 Chennai Central–Nagercoil Weekly Superfast Express
- 16191/16192 Tambaram–Nagercoil Antyodaya Express
- 20627/20628 Chennai Egmore–Nagercoil Junction Vande Bharat Express
- 22657/22658 Tambaram–Nagercoil Superfast Express

== Chennai–Tiruchirappalli ==
- 12653/12654 Rockfort Superfast Express
- 16795/16796 Cholan Superfast Express
- 12605/12606 Pallavan Superfast Express

== Mysuru–Bengaluru ==
- 12613/12614 – Wodeyar Express
- 16023/16024 – Malgudi Express
- 16215/16216 – Chamundi Express
- 16557/16558 – Mysore–Bangalore Rajya Rani Express

== Mysuru–Chennai ==
- 12007/12008 Chennai Central–Mysuru Shatabdi Express
- 12609/12610 Mysuru–Chennai Express
- 16021/16022 Kaveri Express
- 22681/22682 Chennai–Mysuru Weekly Superfast Express.
- 20607/20608 MGR Chennai Central - Mysuru Vande Bharat Express

== Bengaluru–Chennai ==
- 12027/12028 – Chennai Central–Bengaluru City Shatabdi Express
- 12291/12292 – Yesvantpur–Chennai Central Superfast Express
- 12607/12608 – Lal Bagh Express
- 12639/12640 – Brindavan Express
- 12657/12658 – Chennai–Bangalore Mail
- 22625/22626 – Chennai–Bangalore Double Decker Express
- 20607/20608 Mysuru-Chennai Central Vande Bharat Express

== Bengaluru–Hyderabad ==
- 12735/36 Secunderabad–Yesvantpur Garib Rath Express
- 12785/86 Kacheguda–Mysuru Express
- 16569/70 Yasvantpur–Kacheguda Express
- 17603/04 Prashanti Nilayam Express

== Mumbai–Ahmedabad ==
- 12009/10 Mumbai Central–Ahmedabad Shatabdi Express
- 12901/02 Gujarat Mail
- 12931/32 Mumbai Central–Ahmedabad Double Decker Express
- 12933/34 Karnavati Express
- 19011/12 Gujarat Superfast Express
- 22927/28 Lok Shakti Express
- 59439/40 Mumbai Central–Ahmedabad Passenger
- 82901/02 Ahmedabad – Mumbai Central Tejas Express

== Mumbai–Pune ==
Via Kalyan

- 11007/08 Deccan Express
- 11009/10 Sinhagad Express
- 12123/24 Deccan Queen
- 12127/28 Mumbai–Pune Intercity Express
- 22105/06 Indrayani Express

Via Panvel

- 12125/26 Pragati Express

== Mumbai–Nagpur ==
Via Badnera, Bhusaval

- 12139/40 Sewagram Express
- 12289/90 Nagpur Duronto Express

Via Adilabad, Nanded, Aurangabad

- 11401/02 Nandigram Express

Via Akola, Aurangabad

- 11202/01 Lokmanya Tilak Terminus–Ajni Express

== Mumbai–Kolhapur ==
- 11023/24 Sahyadri Express
- 11029/30 Koyna Express
- 17411/12 Mahalaxmi Express

== Mumbai–Nanded ==
Via Manmad

- 17617/18 Tapovan Express
- 11011/12 LTT Kurla–Nanded Express
- 17611/12 Nanded–Mumbai CST Rajya Rani Express

Via Latur

- 17613/14 Panvel–Hazur Sahib Nanded Express

== Mumbai–Kolkata ==
- 12101/02 Jnaneswari Express
- 12151/52 Samarsata Express
- 12261/62 Mumbai CST–Howrah Duronto Express
- 12321/22 Kolkata Mail
- 12809/10 Howrah Mumbai Mail
- 12859/60 Gitanjali Express
- 12869/70 Howrah–Mumbai Superfast Express
- 18029/30 Shalimar–Lokmanya Tilak Terminus Express

== Mumbai–Surat ==
- 12921/22 Flying Ranee
- 12935/36 Surat–Bandra Terminus Intercity Superfast Express

== Mumbai–Jamnagar ==
- 12267/12268 Mumbai Central–Hapa Duronto Express
- 22923/22924 Bandra Terminus–Jamnagar Humsafar Express

== Mumbai–Delhi ==
- 09003/04 Bandra Terminus–Hazrat Nizamuddin Rajdhani Special
- 12215/16 Delhi Sarai Rohilla–Bandra Terminus Garib Rath Express
- 12247/48 Bandra Terminus–Hazrat Nizamuddin Yuva Express
- 12907/08 Maharashtra Sampark Kranti Express
- 12909/10 Bandra Terminus–Hazrat Nizamuddin Garib Rath Express
- 12951/52 Mumbai Rajdhani Express
- 12953/54 August Kranti Rajdhani Express
- 22109/10 Lokmanya Tilak Terminus–Hazrat Nizamuddin AC Express
- 22209/10 Mumbai–New Delhi Duronto Express
- 22221/22 Mumbai CSMT–Hazrat Nizamuddin Rajdhani Express
- 22913/14 Mumbai Central–New Delhi AC Suvidha Special Express

== Mumbai–Bhavnagar ==
- 12971/72 Bandra Terminus–Bhavnagar Terminus Express

== Mumbai–Bhuj ==
- 12959/60 Dadar–Bhuj Superfast Express
- 19115/16 Sayajinagari Express
- 22955/56 Kutch Express

== Mumbai–Amritsar ==
- 11057/58 Mumbai CST–Amritsar Express
- 12903/04 Golden Temple Mail
- 12925/26 Paschim Express

== Mumbai–Ajmer ==
- 12989/90 Dadar–Ajmer Superfast Express
- 22995/96 Ajmer–Bandra Terminus Express

== Mumbai–Bikaner ==
- 12489/90 Bikaner–Dadar Superfast Express
- 14707/08 Ranakpur Express
- 22473/74 Bikaner–Bandra Terminus Superfast Express

== Mumbai–Allahabad ==
- 11069/70 Tulsi Express
- 12293/94 Lokmanya Tilak Terminus–Allahabad Duronto Express

== Mumbai–Hyderabad ==
- 12219/20 Lokmanya Tilak Terminus–Secunderabad AC Duronto Express
- 12701/02 Hussainsagar Express
- 17031/32 Hyderabad–Mumbai Express
- 17057/58 Devagiri Express

== Mumbai–Chennai ==
- 22157/58 Mumbai–Chennai Mail
- 22159/60 Mumbai CST–Chennai Express
- 22179/80 Lokmanya Tilak Terminus–Chennai Central Weekly Express
- 12163/64 Dadar–Chennai Egmore Express

== Mumbai–Lucknow ==
- 12107/08 Lokmanya Tilak Terminus–Lucknow Junction Superfast Express
- 12533/34 Pushpak Express
- 19021/22 Bandra Terminus–Lucknow Weekly Express
- 22121/22 Lokmanya Tilak Terminus–Lucknow AC SF Express

== Mumbai-Gorakhpur ==
- 11055/56 Godaan Express
- 11079/11080 Lokmanya Express
- 11081/82 LTT-Gorakhpur Weekly Express
- 12165/66 Ratnagiri Superfast Express
- 12597/98 Gorakhpur-Mumbai Antyodaya Express
- 15017/18 Kashi Express
- 15065/66 Gorakhpur–Panvel Express
- 15067/68 Gorakhpur–Bandra Terminus Weekly Express
- 19037/38 Avadh Express
- 19091/92 Bandra Terminus-Gorakhpur Humsafar Express
- 20103/04 Gorakhpur-Lokmanya Tilak Terminus SF Express
- 22537/38 Kushinagar Superafst Express
- 22921/22 Bandra Terminus-Gorakhpur Antyodaya Express
- 0102728 Dadar Central-Gorakhpur Special Fare
- 05053/54 Gorakhpur-Bandra Terminus Special Fare

== Mumbai–Patna ==
- 12141/42 Lokmanya Tilak Terminus–Patliputra Express
- 13201/02 Rajendra Nagar–Lokmanya Tilak Terminus Janta Express
- 82355/56 Patna–Mumbai CSMT Suvidha Superfast Express

== Mumbai–Indore ==
- 12227/28 Mumbai Central–Indore Duronto Express
- 12961/62 Avantika Express

== Mumbai–Bhubaneshwar ==
- 11019/20 Konark Express
- 12879/80 Lokmanya Tilak Terminus–Bhubaneswar Superfast Express

== Mumbai–Goa ==
- 10103/04 Mandovi Express
- 10111/12 Konkan Kanya Express
- 11085/86,11099/11100 Lokmanya Tilak Terminus–Madgaon AC Double Decker Express
- 12051/52 Dadar–Madgaon Jan Shatabdi Express
- 22115/16 Lokmanya Tilak Terminus–Karmali AC Superfast Express
- 22119/20 Mumbai CSMT–Karmali Tejas Express

== Mumbai–Manmad ==
- 12109/10 Panchvati Express
- 12117/18 Lokmanya Tilak Terminus–Manmad Godavari Express

== Mumbai–Valsad ==
- 59023/24 Mumbai Central–Valsad Fast Passenger
- 59046 Valsad–Bandra Terminus Passenger

== Mumbai–Visakhapatnam ==
- 18519/20 Visakhapatnam–Lokmanya Tilak Terminus Express
- 22847/48 Visakhapatnam–Lokmanya Tilak Terminus Superfast Express

== Mumbai–Thiruvananthapuram ==
- 12201/02 Kochuveli–Lokmanya Tilak Terminus Garib Rath Express
- 16331/32 Mumbai CSMT–Thiruvananthapuram Weekly Express
- 16345/46 Netravati Express
- 22113/14 Lokmanya Tilak Terminus–Kochuveli Express

== Delhi–Ahmedabad ==
- 12915/16 Ashram Express
- 12917/18 Gujarat Sampark Kranti Express
- 12957/58 Swarna Jayanti Rajdhani Express

== Delhi–Chennai ==
- 12269/70 Chennai–Hazrat Nizamuddin Duronto Express
- 12433/34 Chennai Rajdhani Express
- 12611/12 Chennai Central–Hazrat Nizamuddin Garib Rath Express
- 12621/22 Tamil Nadu Express
- 12615/16 Grand Trunk Express

== Delhi–Bengaluru ==
- 12213/14 Yeshvantapur–Delhi Sarai Rohilla AC Duronto Express
- 12627/28 Karnataka Express
- 12629/30/49/50 Karnataka Sampark Kranti Express
- 22691/92 Bangalore Rajdhani Express

== Delhi–Hyderabad ==
- 12285/86 Secunderabad–Hazrat Nizamuddin Duronto Express
- 12437/38 Secunderabad Rajdhani Express
- 12721/22 Dakshin Express
- 12723/24 Telangana Express

== Delhi–Thiruvananthapuram ==
- 12431/32 Thiruvananthapuram Rajdhani Express
- 12625/26 Kerala Express
- 12643/44 Thiruvananthapuram Swarna Jayanti Express
- 22633/34 Thiruvananthapuram–Hazrat Nizamuddin Express
- 22653/54 Thiruvananthapuram–Hazrat Nizamuddin Express (via Kottayam)

== Delhi–Kochi ==
- 12283/84 Ernakulam–H.Nizamuddin Duronto Express
- 12617/18 Mangala Lakshadweep Express
- 12645/46 Millennium Express
- 22655/56 Ernakulam–Hazrat Nizamuddin Express

== Delhi–Kolkata ==
- 12249/50 Howrah–Delhi Yuva Express
- 12259/60 Sealdah–New Delhi Duronto Express
- 12273/74 Howrah–New Delhi Duronto Express
- 12301/02/05/06 Howrah Rajdhani Express
- 12303/04/81/82 Poorva Express
- 12313/14 Sealdah Rajdhani Express
- 12323/24 Howrah–Anand Vihar Superfast Express
- 12329/30 West Bengal Sampark Kranti Express
- 13039/40 Howrah–Delhi Janata Express
- 13111/12 Lal Quila Express
- 13119/20 Sealdah–Anand Vihar Express
- 22857/58 Santragachi–Anand Vihar Superfast Express

== Delhi–Dehradun ==
- 12017/18 Dehradun Shatabdi Express
- 12055/56 Dehradun Jan Shatabdi Express
- 12205/06 Nanda Devi AC Express
- 14041/42 Mussoorie Express

== Delhi–Amritsar ==
- 12013/14 Amritsar Shatabdi Express
- 12029/30 New Delhi–Amritsar Swarna Shatabdi Express
- 12031/32 New Delhi–Amritsar Shatabdi Express
- 12459/60 New Delhi–Amritsar Intercity Express
- 12497/98 Shan-e-Punjab Express

== Delhi–Katra ==
- 12445/46 Uttar Sampark Kranti Express
- 14033/34 Jammu Mail
- 22461/62 Shri Shakti AC Express

== Delhi–Ajmer ==
- 12015/16 New Delhi–Daurai Shatabdi Express
- 12065/66 Ajmer–Delhi Sarai Rohilla Jan Shatabdi Express

== Delhi–Kanpur ==
- 12033/34 Kanpur–New Delhi Shatabdi Express
- 12451/52 Shram Shakti Express
- 14151/52 Kanpur Central–Anand Vihar Terminal Express

== Delhi–Allahabad ==
- 12275/76 Allahabad–New Delhi Humsafar Express
- 12417/18 Prayagraj Express
- 22437/38 Allahabad–Anand Vihar Terminal Humsafar Express

== Delhi–Kalka ==
- 12005/06 New Delhi–Kalka Shatabdi Express
- 12011/12 Kalka Shatabdi Express
- 14095/96 Himalayan Queen Express

== Delhi–Lucknow ==
- 12003/04 Lucknow Swarna Shatabdi Express
- 12229/30 Lucknow Mail
- 12419/20 Gomti Express
- 12429/30 Lucknow–New Delhi AC Superfast Express
- 12583/84 Lucknow Junction–Anand Vihar Terminal Double Decker Express
- 82501/02 Lucknow Junction–New Delhi IRCTC Tejas Express

== Surat–Chhapra ==
- 19045/46 Tapti Ganga Express
- 09065/66 Surat–Chhapra Clone Special

== Indore–Nagpur ==
- 12913/14 Indore–Nagpur Tri Shatabdi Express
- 12923/94 Dr. Ambedkar Nagar–Nagpur Superfast Express
- 20911/20912 Indore–Nagpur Vande Bharat Express

== Lucknow–Varanasi ==
- 14203/04 Varanasi–Lucknow Intercity Express
- 14219/20 Varanasi–Lucknow Intercity Express (via Pratapgarh)
- 14227/28 Varanasi–Lucknow Charbagh Varuna Express
- 15007/08 Krishak Express

== Lucknow-Gorakhpur ==
- 12531/32 Lucknow Junction-Gorakhpur Intercity Express
- 15069/70 Aishbagh-Gorakhpur Intercity Express
- 15081/82 Gomti Nagar-Nakaha Jungle Intercity Express

== Lucknow-Meerut ==
- 22453/54 Lucknow-Meerut City Rajya Rani Express
- 22489/90 Lucknow-Meerut City Vande Bharat Express

== Lucknow-Bengaluru ==
- 12539/40 Lucknow-Yeswantpur SF Express (via Perambur)
- 22683/84 Lucknow-Yeswantpur SF Express (via Kacheguda)

== Lucknow-Chandigarh ==
- 12231/32 Lucknow-Chandigarh Express
- 15011/12 Lucknow Junction-Chandigarh Express

== Lucknow-Pune ==
- 11407/08 Lucknow-Pune Express
- 12103/04 Lucknow-Pune SF Express

== Lucknow-Patna ==
- 12529/30 Lucknow Jn- Patliputra SF Express
- 22345/46 Gomti Nagar- Patna Jn Vande Bharat Express

== Lucknow-Chhapra ==
- 15053/54 Lucknow Jn- Chhapra Express
- 15113/14 Gomti Nagar- Chhapra Kacheri Express

== Kolkata–Dhanbad ==
- 12339/40 Coalfield Express
- 22387/88 Black Diamond Express
- 12385/86 Howrah–Dhanbad Double Decker Express

== Kolkata–Asansol ==
- 12341/42 Agniveena Express
- 12383/84 Sealdah–Asansol Intercity Express

== Kolkata–Rampurhat ==
- 13187/88 Maa Tara Express
- 53047/48 Viswabharati Fast Passenger

== Kolkata–New Jalpaiguri ==
- 12041/42 New Jalpaiguri–Howrah Shatabdi Express
- 12343/44 Darjeeling Mail
- 22309/10 Howrah–New Jalpaiguri AC Express
- 22301/22302 Howrah–New Jalpaiguri Vande Bharat Express
- 12363/12364 Kolkata–Haldibari Intercity Express
- 15721/15722 Paharia Express
- 13147/13148 Uttar Banga Express

== Kolkata–Porbandar ==
- 12905/06 Shalimar–Porbandar Superfast Express
- 12949/50 Porbandar–Santragachi Kavi Guru Express

== Kolkata–Puri ==
- 12277/78 Howrah–Puri Shatabdi Express
- 12821/22 Dhauli Express
- 12837/38 Howrah–Puri Express
- 12881/82 Puri–Howrah Garib Rath Express
- 12887/88 Puri–Howrah Express
- 18409/10 Sri Jagannath Express
- 22201/02 Sealdah–Puri Duronto Express
- 22835/36 Shalimar–Puri Express

== Kolkata–Patna ==
- 12023/24 Howrah–Patna Jan Shatabdi Express
- 12351/52 Howrah–Rajendra Nagar Express
- 12359/60 Kolkata–Patna Garib Rath Express
- 13131/32 Kolkata–Patna Express
- 22213/14 Kolkata Shalimar–Patna Duronto Express

== Kolkata–Chennai ==
- 12839/40 Howrah–Chennai Mail
- 12841/42 Coromandel Express
- 22807/08 Santragachi–Chennai Central AC Express
- 22825/26 Shalimar–Chennai Central Weekly Superfast Express
- 22841/42 Santragachi–Chennai Central Antyodaya Express

== Kolkata–Bengaluru ==
- 12245/46 Howrah–Yeshvantapur Duronto Express
- 12863/64 Howrah–Yesvantpur Superfast Express
- 22863/64 Howrah–Yesvantpur AC Superfast Express
- 22887/88 Howrah–Yesvantpur Humsafar Express

== Kolkata–Hyderabad ==
- 12703/04 Falaknuma Express
- 12773/74 Shalimar–Secunderabad AC Superfast Express
- 18645/46 East Coast Express
- 22849/50 Shalimar Secunderabad Express

== Pune–Delhi ==
- 12263/64 Hazrat Nizamuddin–Pune Duronto Express
- 12493/94 Darshan AC Express

== Pune–Kolkata ==
- 12129/30 Azad Hind Express
- 12221/22 Pune–Howrah Duronto Express
- 20821/22 Pune–Santragachi Humsafar Express

== Pune–Hyderabad ==
- 11025/26 Pune–Secunderabad Shatabdi Express
- 17013/14 Hyderabad–Pune Express

== Pune–Kochi ==
- 11097/98 Poorna Express
- 22149/50 Pune–Ernakulam Express

== Pune–Nagpur ==
- 12113/14 Pune–Nagpur Garib Rath Express
- 12135/36 Pune–Nagpur Express
- 22123/24 Pune–Ajni AC Superfast Express
- 22139/40 Pune–Ajni Humsafar Express
- 11419/20 Pune–Nagpur Humsafar Express

== Pune–Amravati (Maharashtra) ==
- 11405/06 Pune–Amravati Express
- 22117/18 Pune–Amravati AC Superfast Express

== Pune–Solapur ==
- 12157/58 Hutatma Express
- 12169/70 Pune–Solapur Intercity Express

== Guwahati–Jammu Tawi ==
- 15651/52 Lohit Express
- 15653/54 Amarnath Express

== Chennai–Coimbatore ==
- 12243/44 Chennai Central–Coimbatore Shatabdi Express
- 12671/72 Nilgiri Express
- 12673/74 Cheran Superfast Express
- 12675/76 Kovai Express
- 12679/80 Chennai Central–Coimbatore Intercity Express
- 12681/82 Coimbatore–Chennai Central Superfast Express
- 20643/44 Chennai Central–Coimbatore Vande Bharat Express

== Chennai–Hyderabad ==
- 12603/12604 Chennai–Hyderabad Superfast Express
- 12759/12760 Charminar Express
- 17651/17652 Kacheguda–Chengalpattu Express

== Chennai–Madurai ==
- 12635/12636 Vaigai Superfast Express
- 12637/12638 Pandian Superfast Express
- 22623/22624 Mahal Express
- 22671/22672 Chennai Egmore–Madurai Tejas Express

== Guwahati–Delhi ==
- 12501/12502 Poorvottar Sampark Kranti Express
- 12505/12506 North East Express

== Guwahati–Kolkata ==
- 12345/12346 Saraighat Express
- 12517/12518 Kolkata–Guwahati Garib Rath Express

== Guwahati–Mumbai ==
- 12519/12520 Lokmanya Tilak Terminus–Kamakhya AC Express
- 15645/15646 Lokmanya Tilak Terminus–Guwahati Express (via Katihar)
- 15647/15648 Lokmanya Tilak Terminus–Guwahati Express (via Malda Town)
- 22511/22512 Lokmanya Tilak Terminus–Kamakhya Karmabhoomi Express

== Guwahati–Bangalore ==
- 12509/12510 Kaziranga Superfast Express
- 12551/12552 Yesvantpur–Kamakhya AC Superfast Express

== Visakhapatnam–Delhi ==
- 12803/04 Visakhapatnam Swarna Jayanti Express
- 12807/08 Samata Express
- 22415/16 Andhra Pradesh Express

== Visakhapatnam–Hyderabad ==
- 12727/28 Hyderabad–Visakhapatnam Godavari Express
- 12739/40 Visakhapatnam–Secunderabad Garib Rath Express
- 12783/84 Secunderabad–Visakhapatnam AC Express
- 12805/06 Janmabhoomi Express
- 22203/04 Visakhapatnam–Secunderabad Duronto Express

== Visakhapatnam-Tirupati ==
- 17487/88 Tirumala Express
- 22707/08 Visakhapatnam-Tirupati Double Decker Express

== Hyderabad–Tirupati ==
- 12734/35 Narayanadri Express
- 12763/64 Padmavati Express
- 12769/70 Seven Hills Express
- 12797/98 Kacheguda –Chittoor Venkatadri Express

== Hyderabad–Vijayawada ==
- 12713/14 Satavahana Express
- 12795/96 Secunderabad–Vijayawada Intercity Express

== Hyderabad–Guntur ==
- 17201/02 Golconda Express
- 12705/06 Guntur–Secunderabad Intercity Express
- 12747/48 Palnadu Express

== Hyderabad–Kurnool ==
- 17023/24 Tungabhadra Express
- 17027/28 Hundry Express

== Vijayawada–Chennai ==
- 12077/78 Chennai Central–Vijayawada Jan Shatabdi Express
- 12711/12 Pinakini Express
- 20677/78 MGR Chennai Central–Vijayawada Vande Bharat Express

== Chennai - Rameswaram ==
- 22661/22662 Sethu Superfast Express
- 16851/16852 Boat Mail Express

== Chennai - Tirunelveli ==
- 12631/12632 Nellai Express
- 20665/20666 Chennai Egmore - Tirunelveli Vande Bharat Express
