= Kaveri Express =

Train in India

Cauvery Express
Overview
- Service type: Express
- Locale: Tamil Nadu, Karnataka & Andhra Pradesh
- First service: September 11, 1980; 45 years ago
- Current operator: Southern Railway

Route
- Termini: MGR Chennai Central (MAS); Ashokapuram (AP)
- Stops: 20
- Distance travelled: 500 km (311 mi)
- Average journey time: 9 hours 45 minutes
- Service frequency: Daily
- Train number: 16021 / 16022

On-board services
- Classes: AC First Class, AC 2 Tier, AC 3 Tier, Sleeper Class, General Unreserved
- Seating arrangements: Yes
- Sleeping arrangements: Yes
- Catering facilities: No pantry car attached
- Observation facilities: Large windows
- Baggage facilities: Available
- Other facilities: Below the seats

Technical
- Rolling stock: ICF coach
- Track gauge: 1,676 mm (5 ft 6 in)
- Operating speed: 120 km/h (75 mph) maximum, 51.30 km/h (32 mph) average including 20 halts.

The 16021 / 16022 Kaveri Express also known as (Cauvery Express) is a daily train running between Chennai and Ashokapuram in Mysuru, in both directions. This train belongs to Southern Railway and is maintained at Chennai.

== History ==
In Meter Gauge era, this train was earlier a daily train running between Bengaluru and Mysuru in the opposite timings to that of Chamundi Express. To provide connectivity to Chennai from Mysuru, this train was extended in 1998. It was later extended from Mysuru to Ashokapuram in 2025.

== Coach composition ==
This train has 14 sleeper classes: two 3-tier AC, two 2-tier AC, 1-first cum two tire AC, two unreserved coaches, and a 2-second sitting cum luggage van from Chennai, which sums to 24. Previously, there used to be an engine change at Bangalore City; the engine changed from diesel to electric in 16022 and the opposite in 16021. After the electrification of the Bangalore–Mysore line, the train runs with an electric loco from Chennai to Mysore all the way.

== Routing ==
It runs from MGR Chennai Central to Ashokapuram with stops at Perambur, Tiruvallur, Arrakkonam Jn., Katpadi Jn., Vaniyambadi, Ambur, Jolarpettai Jn., Kuppam, Bangarapet Jn., Whitefield, Krishnarajapuram Jn., KSR Bengaluru Cantt, KSR Bengaluru City Jn., Kengeri, Channapatna, Ramanagara, Maddur, Mandya, Srirangapatna, Mysuru Jn.

== Loco link ==
It is hauled by a Royapuram (Chennai) electric loco shed-based(some times Diesel and Electric Loco Shed, Krishnarajapuram based) WAP-7 locomotive on its entire journey.
