= Mysore–Bangalore Rajya Rani Express =

Rajya Rani Express
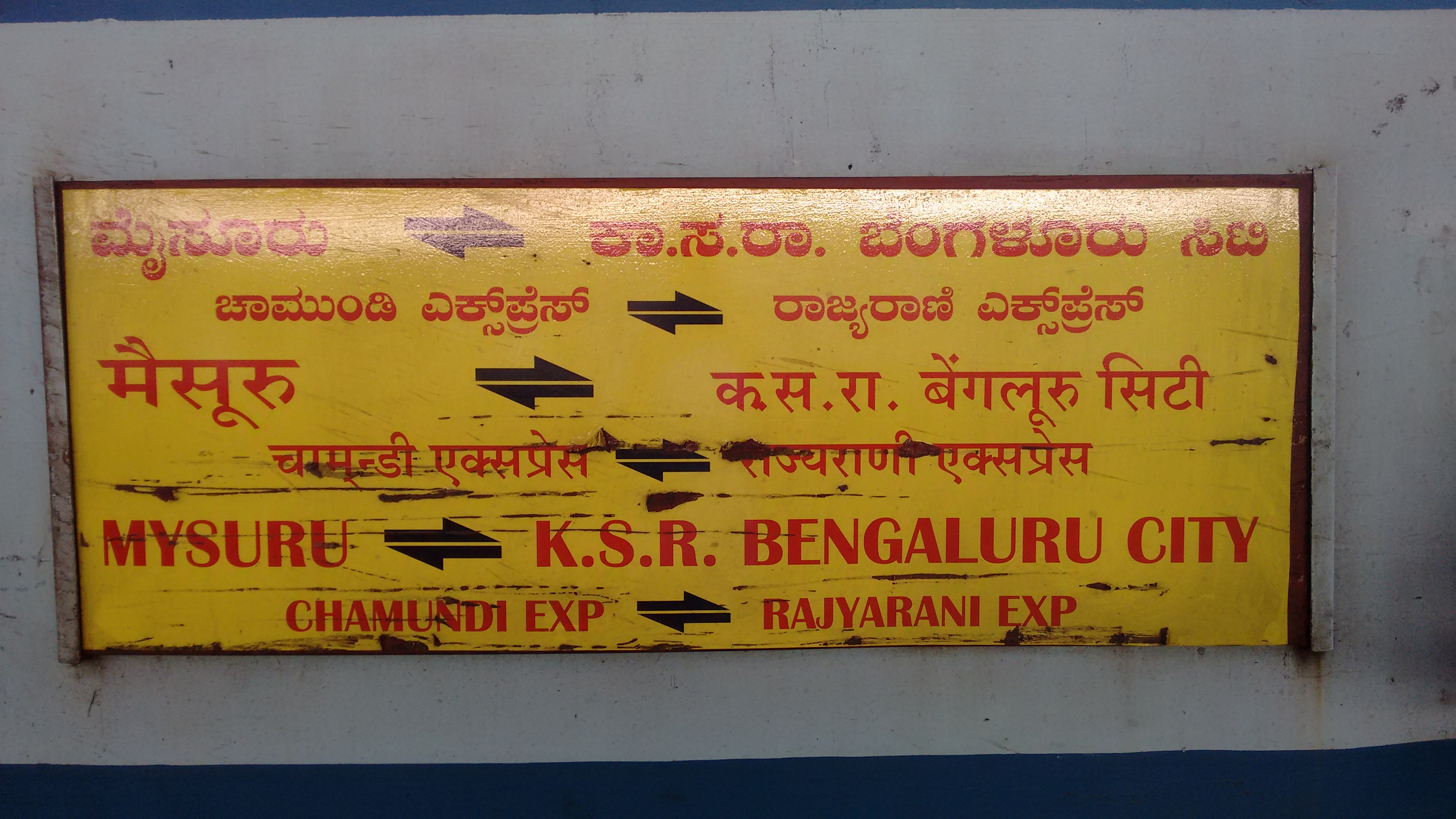

Overview
- Service type: Rajya Rani Express
- First service: 1 July 2011; 14 years ago
- Current operator: South Western Railways

Route
- Termini: Bangalore City (SBC); Mysore (MYS)
- Stops: 8
- Distance travelled: 139 km (86 mi)
- Average journey time: 2 hours 40 minutes
- Service frequency: Daily
- Train number: 20659 / 20660

On-board services
- Classes: General Unreserved, AC Chair Car, 2S
- Seating arrangements: Yes
- Sleeping arrangements: No
- Catering facilities: On-board catering
- Observation facilities: Rake sharing with 16215/16216 Chamundi Express
- Other facilities: Below the seats

Technical
- Rolling stock: ICF coach
- Track gauge: 1,676 mm (5 ft 6 in)
- Operating speed: 52 km/h (32 mph) average including halts
Route map
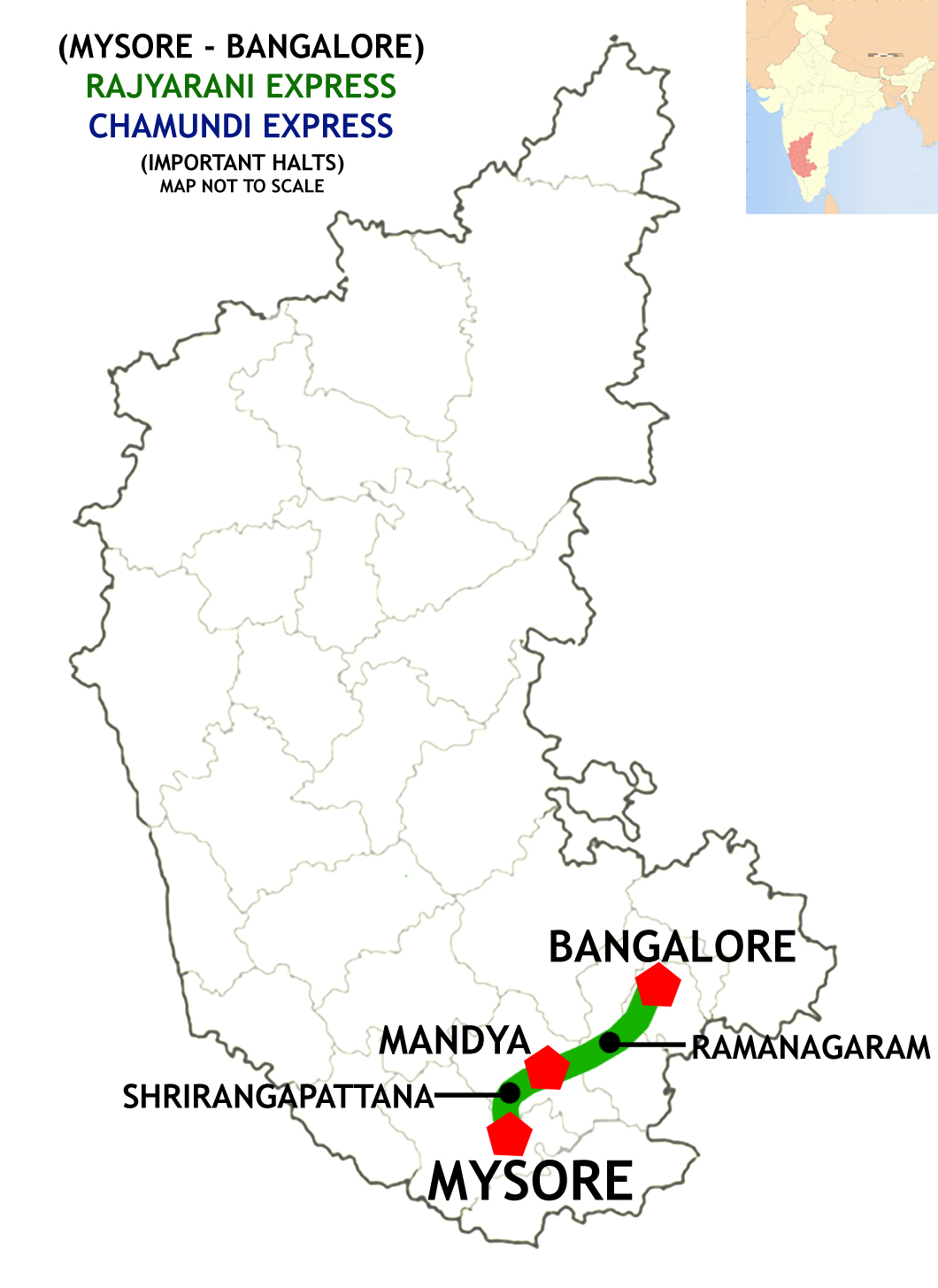

The 20659 / 20660 Rajya Rani Express is a daily commuter train between Mysore and Bangalore. This train leaves Bangalore City at 11:30 AM and reaches Mysore at 1:45 PM. In the return direction, it leaves Mysore at 2:50 PM to reach Bangalore City at 5:20 PM.

It operates with the number 20660 from Bangalore to Mysore and 20659 in the reverse direction. En route, this train stops at Kengeri, Bidadi, Ramanagara, Channapatna, Maddur, Mandya, Pandavapura and Srirangapatna.

It offers second-class chair cars & an air-conditioned chair car available for booking in advance.

== History ==
Rajya Rani Express trains are a series of express trains operated by Indian Railways to connect state capitals with other cities important for tourism, pilgrimage or business. This was introduced in the Rail Budget 2011.

== Traction ==
it was hauled by WDM-3A and WDP-4 throughout the journey

== Gallery ==
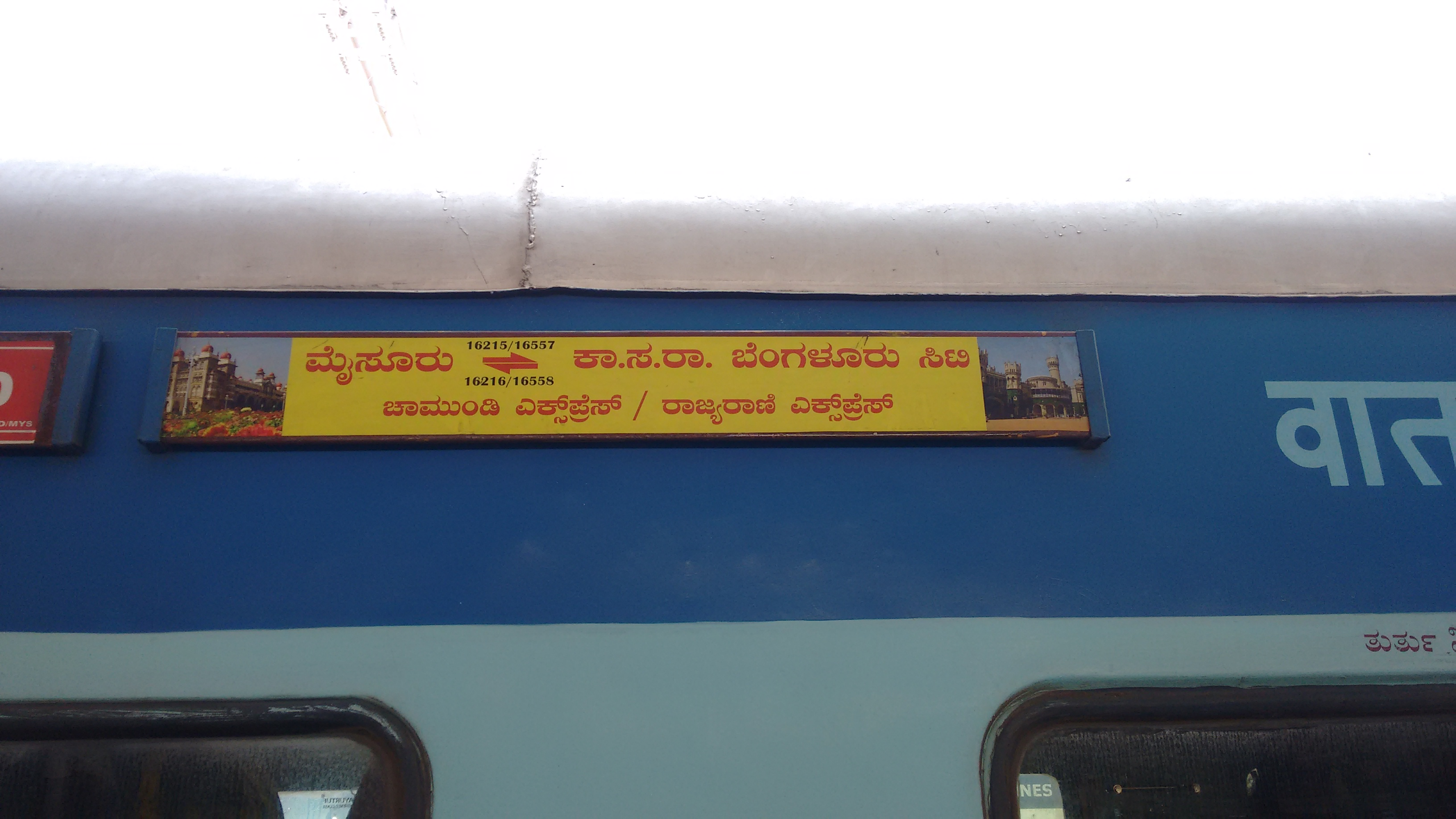

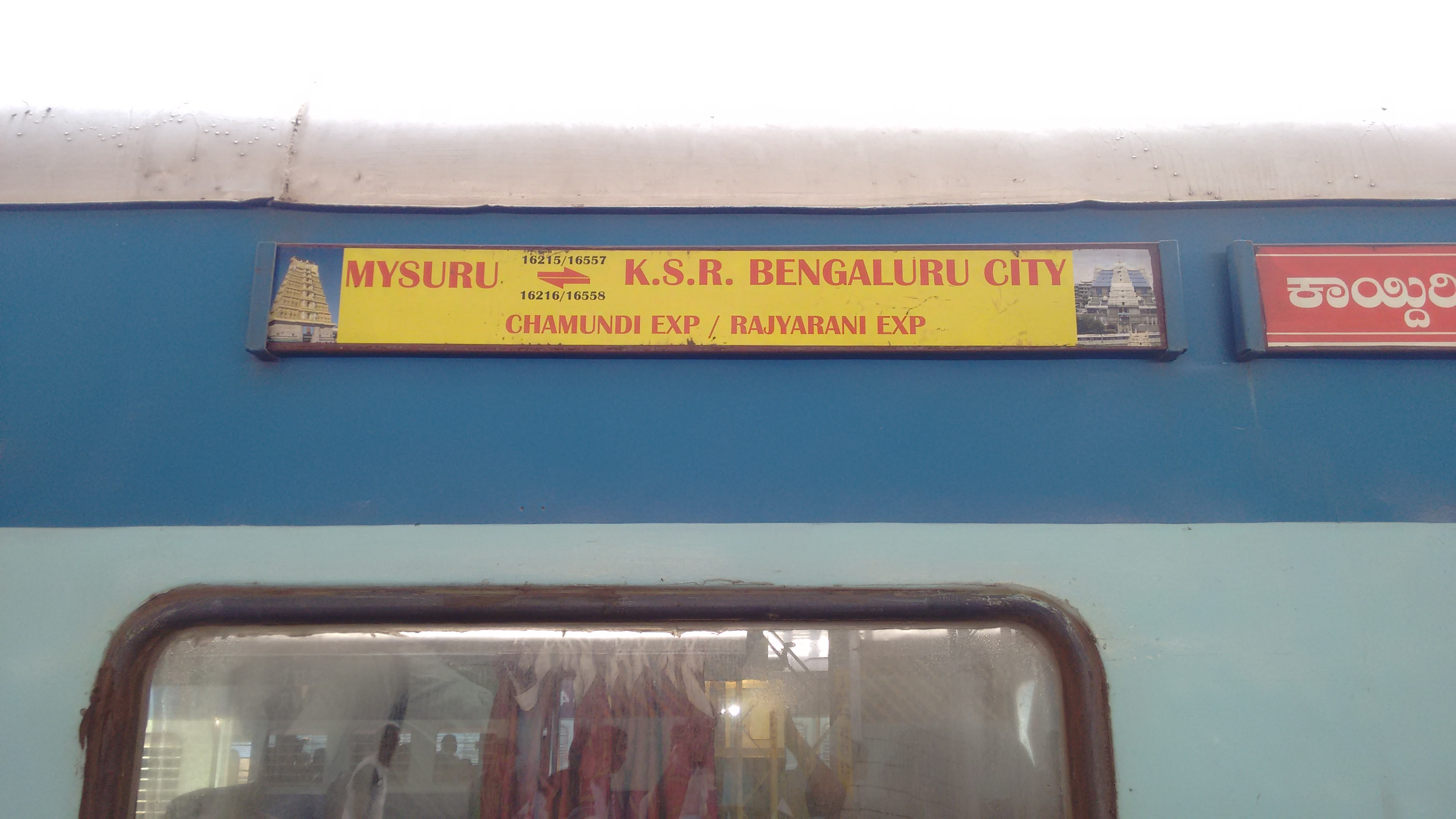

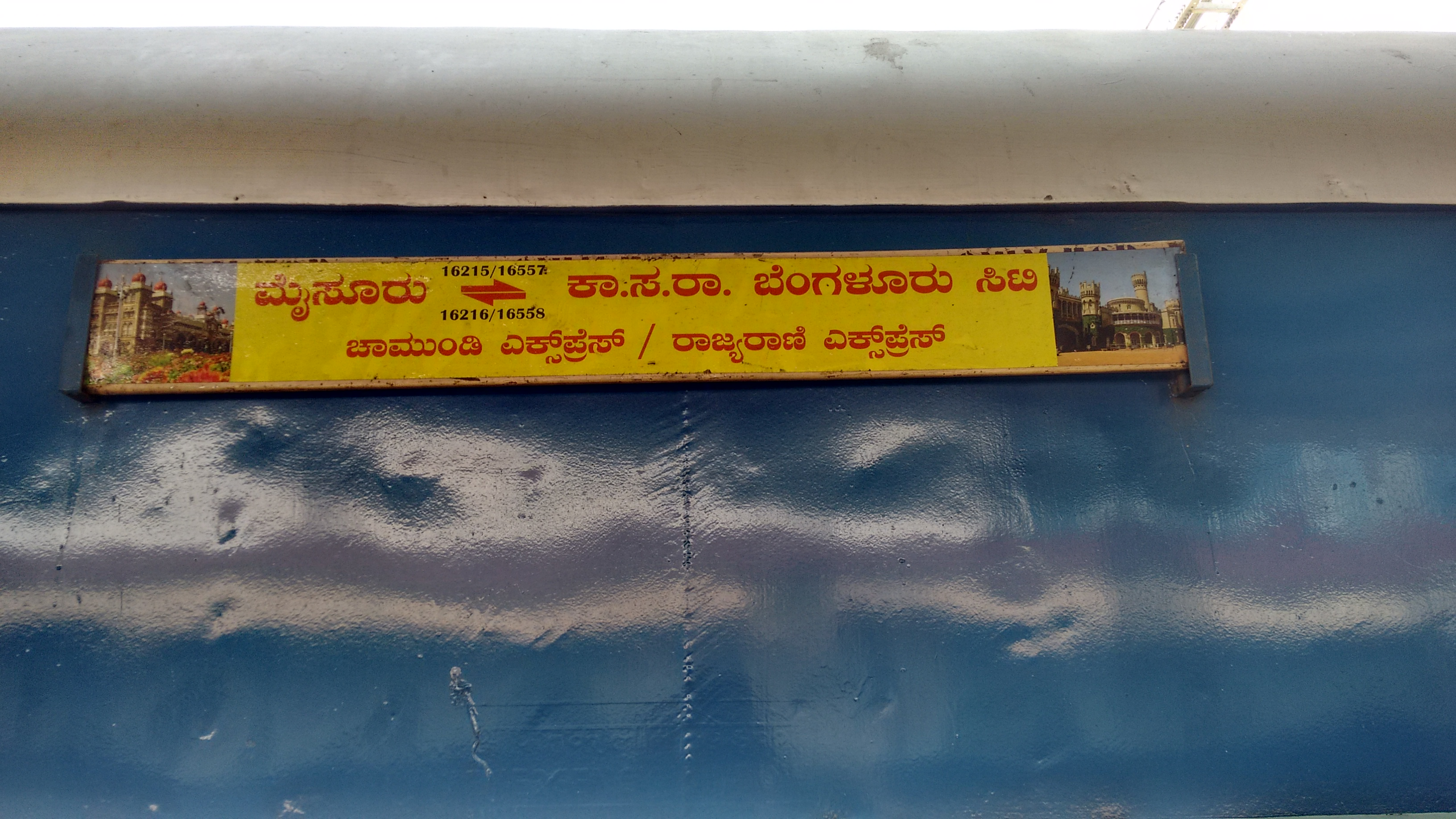

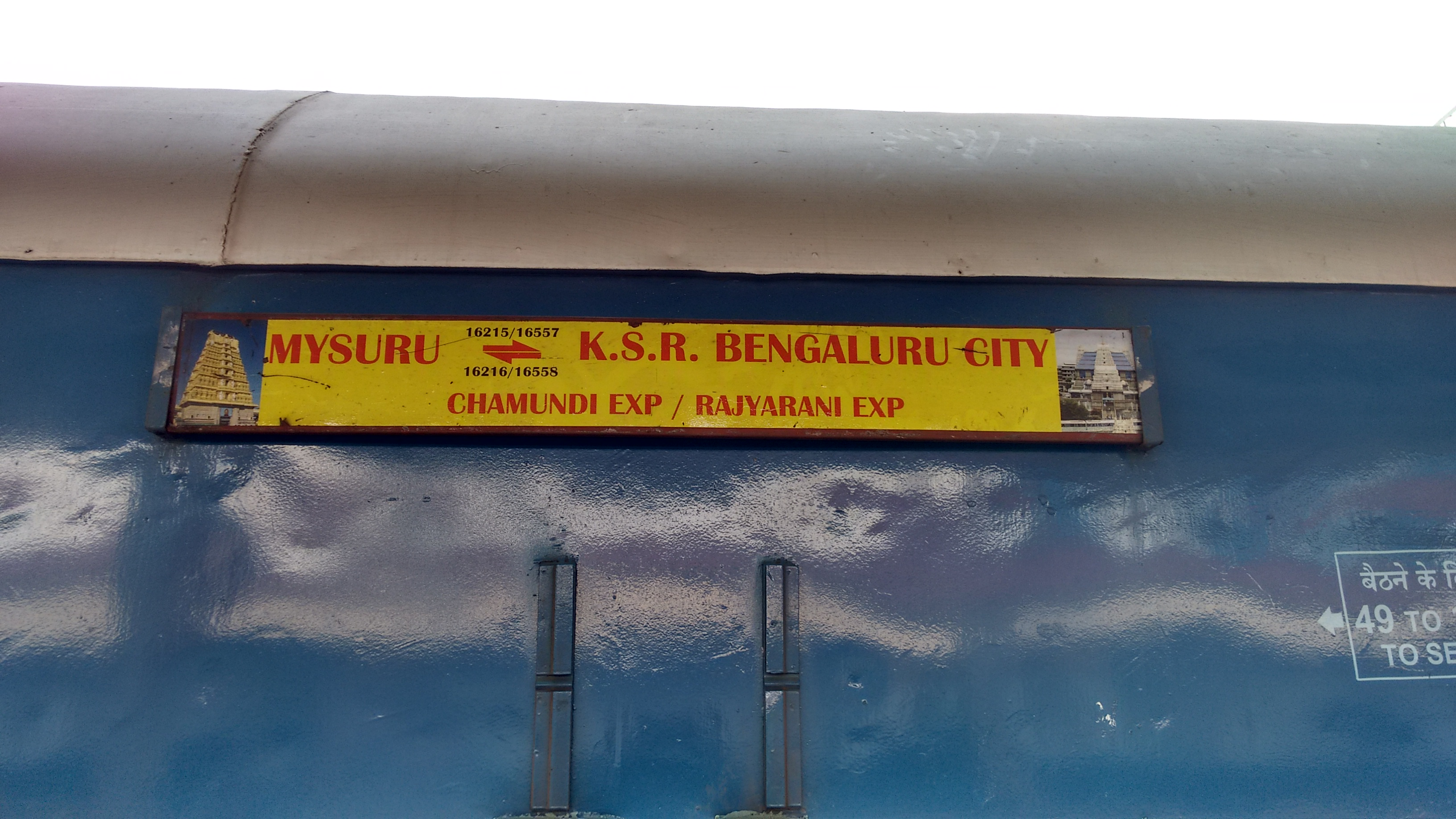

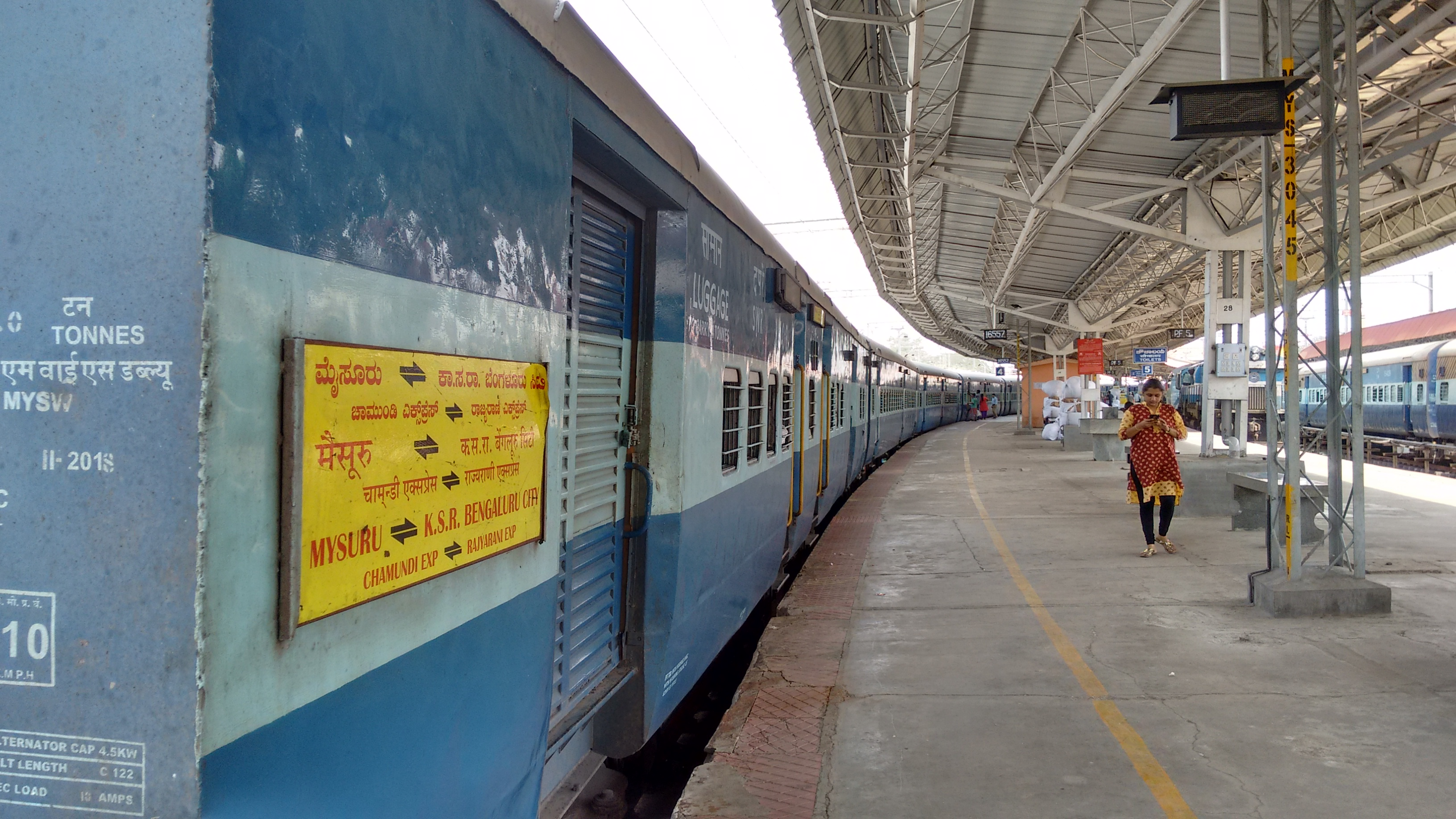

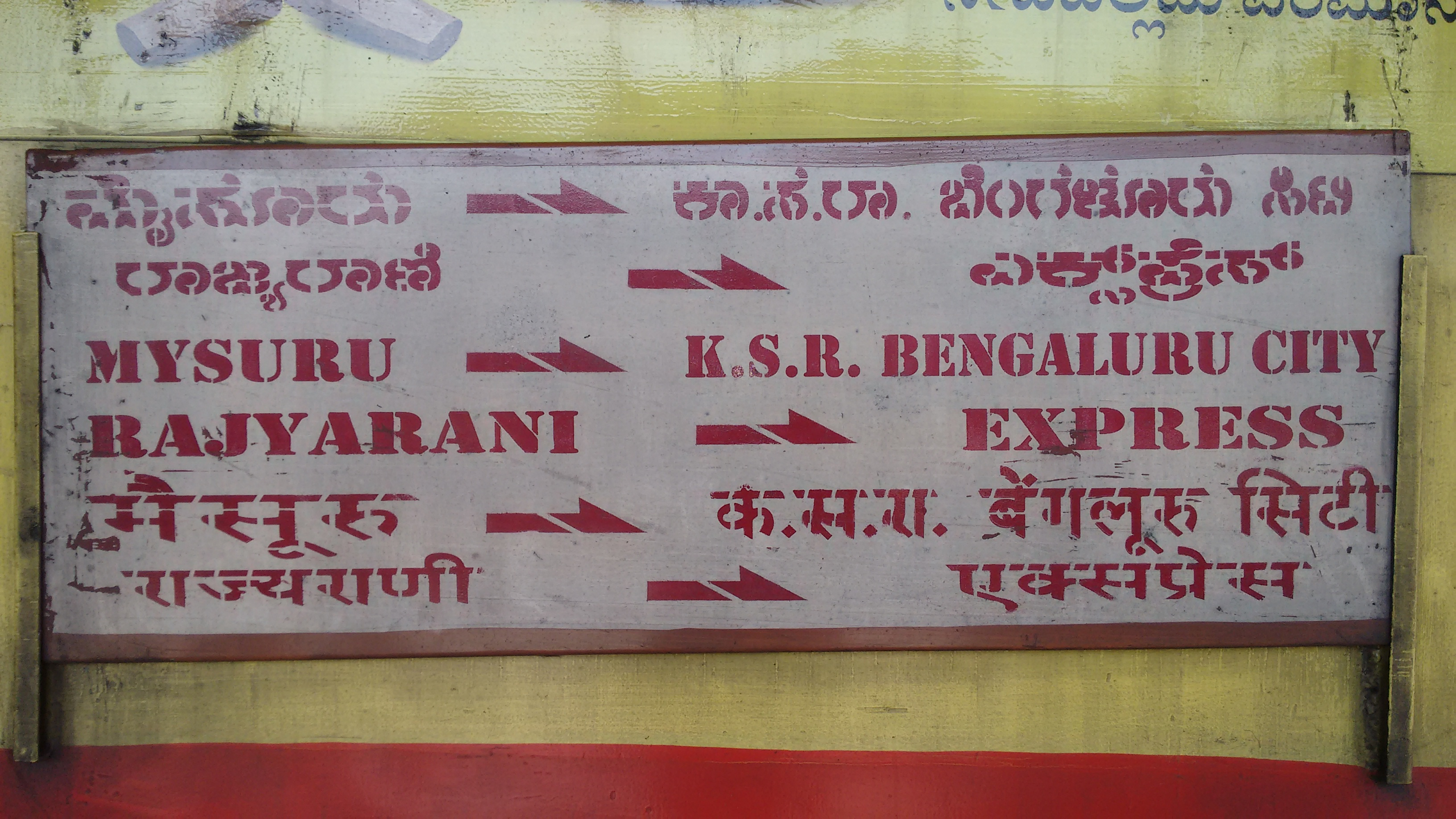

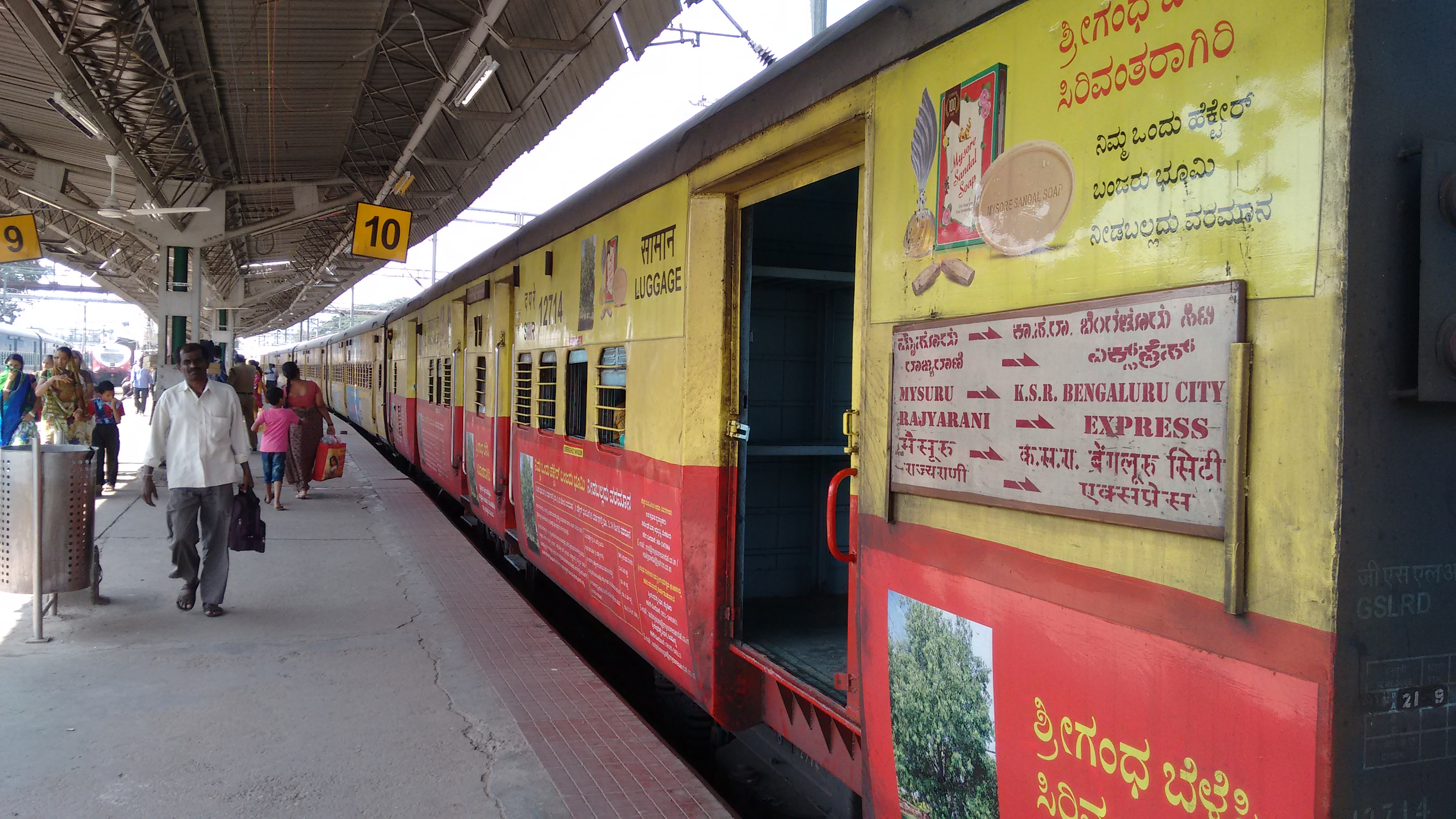

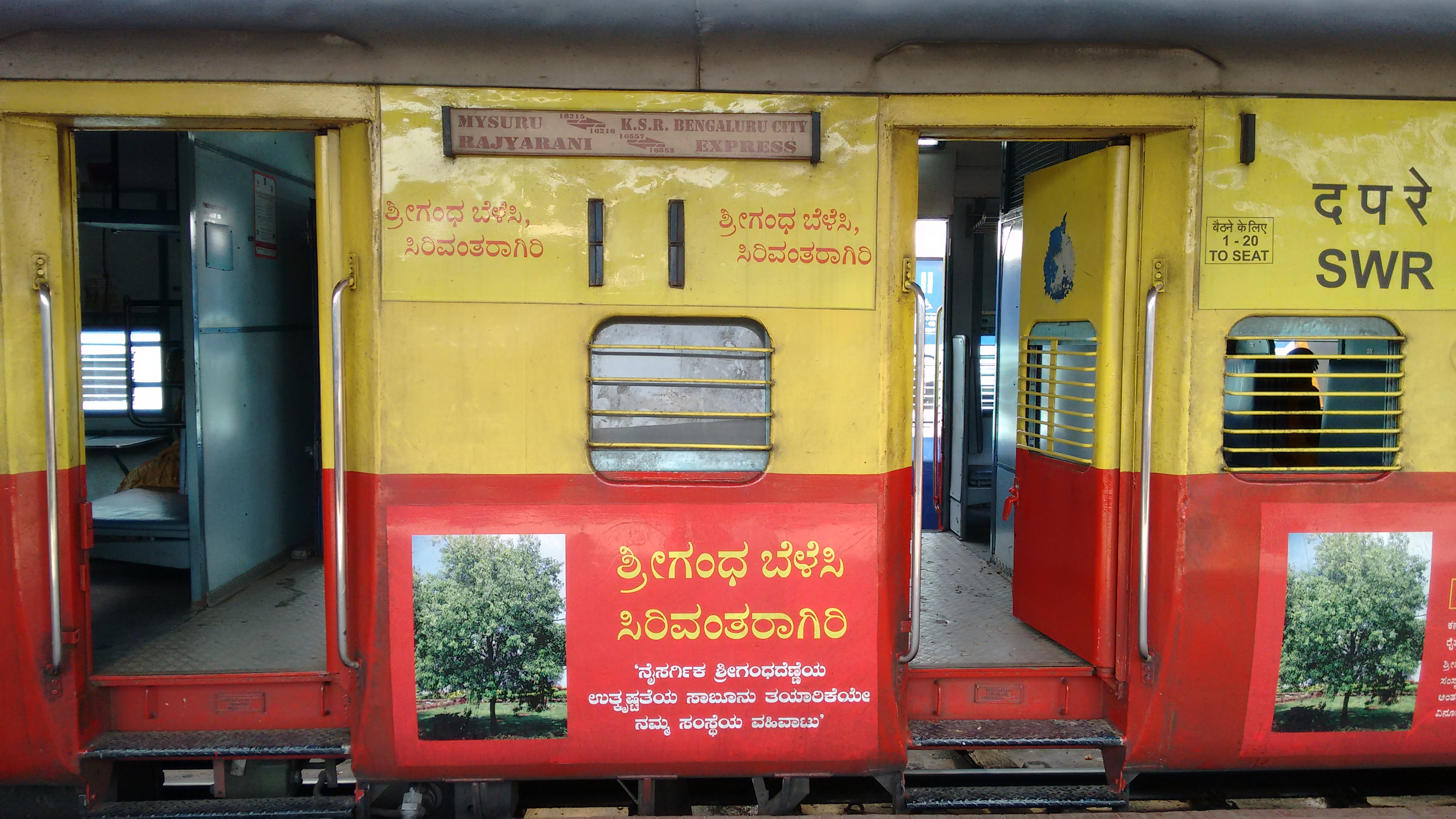

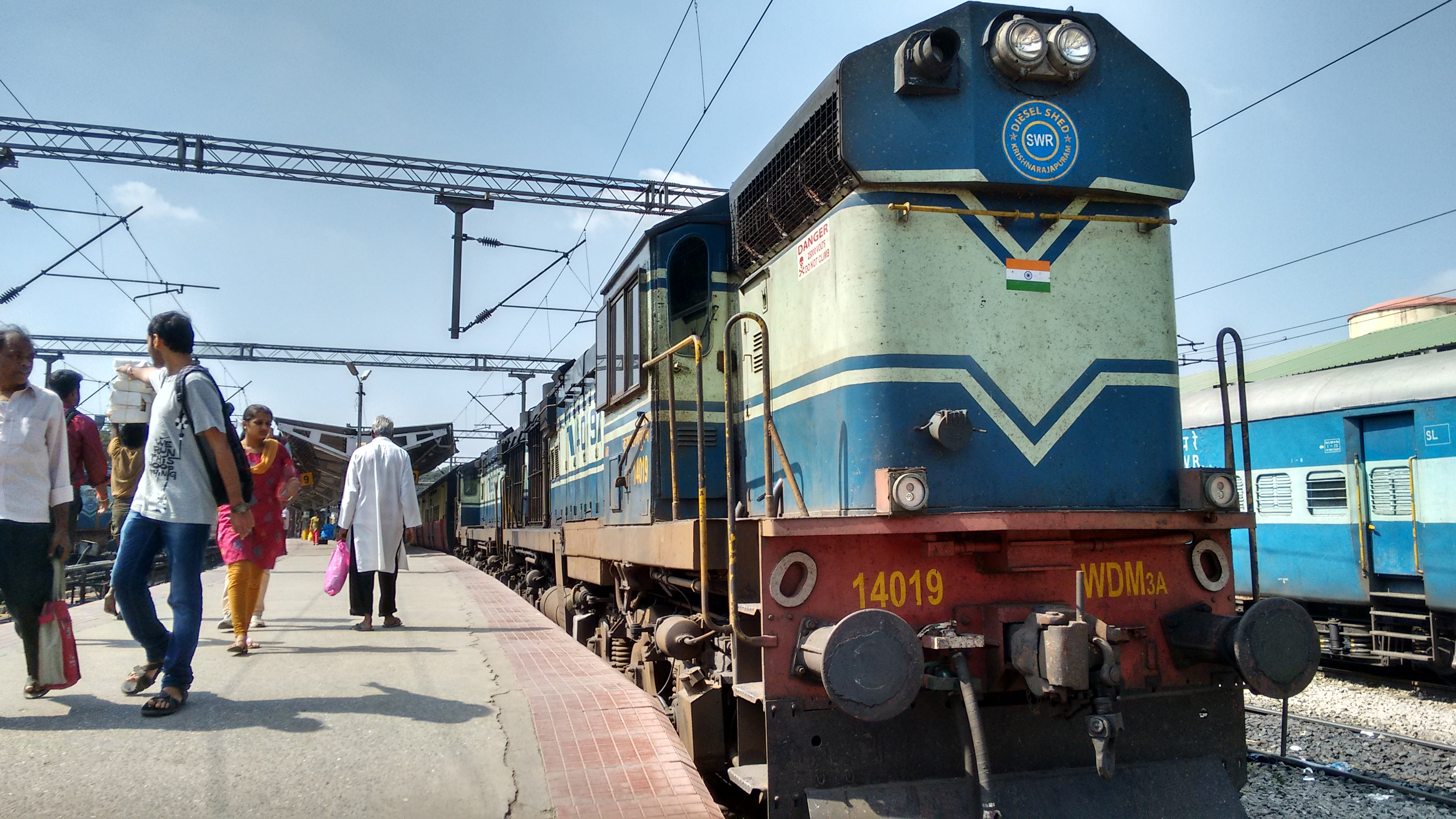

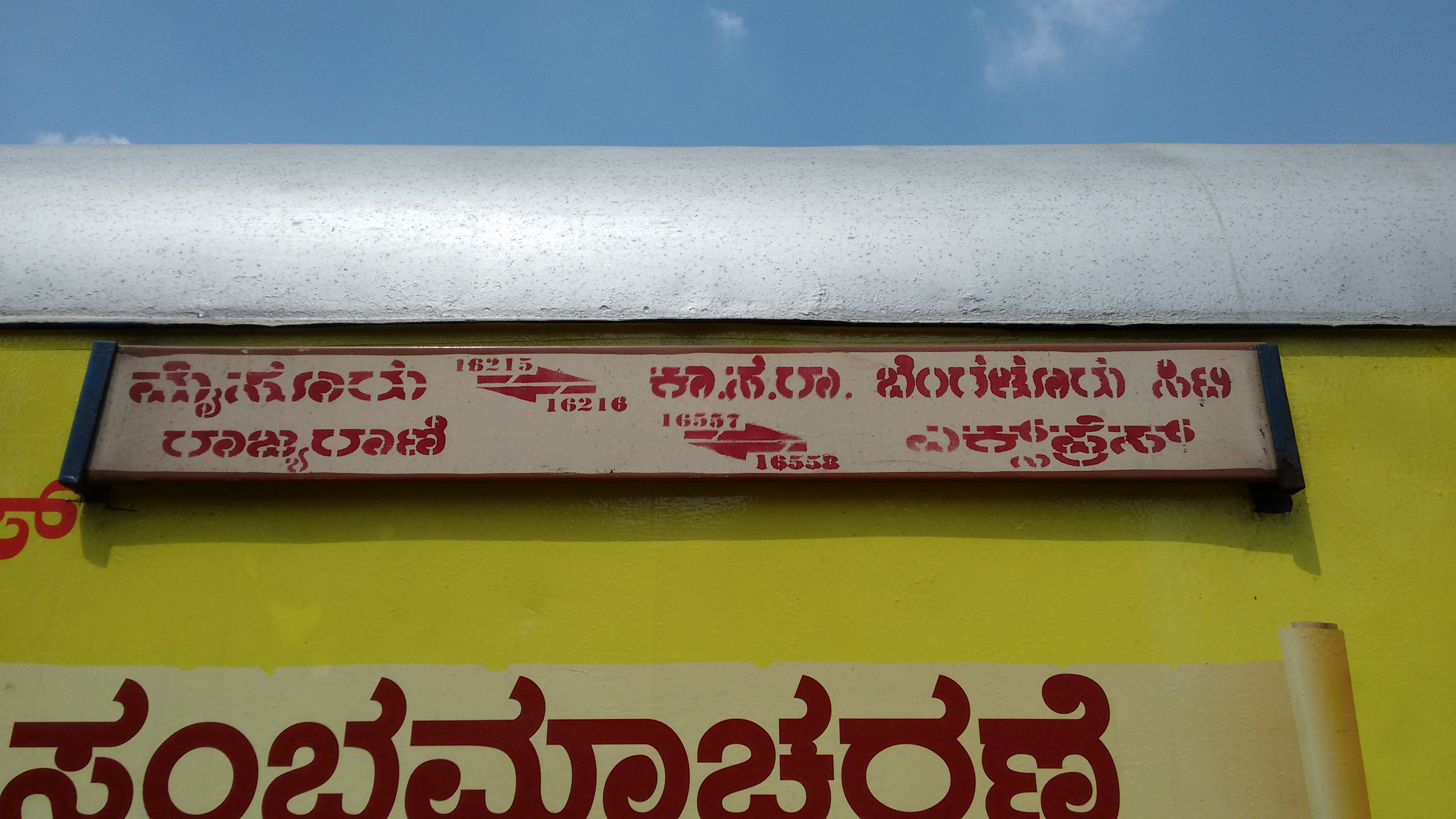

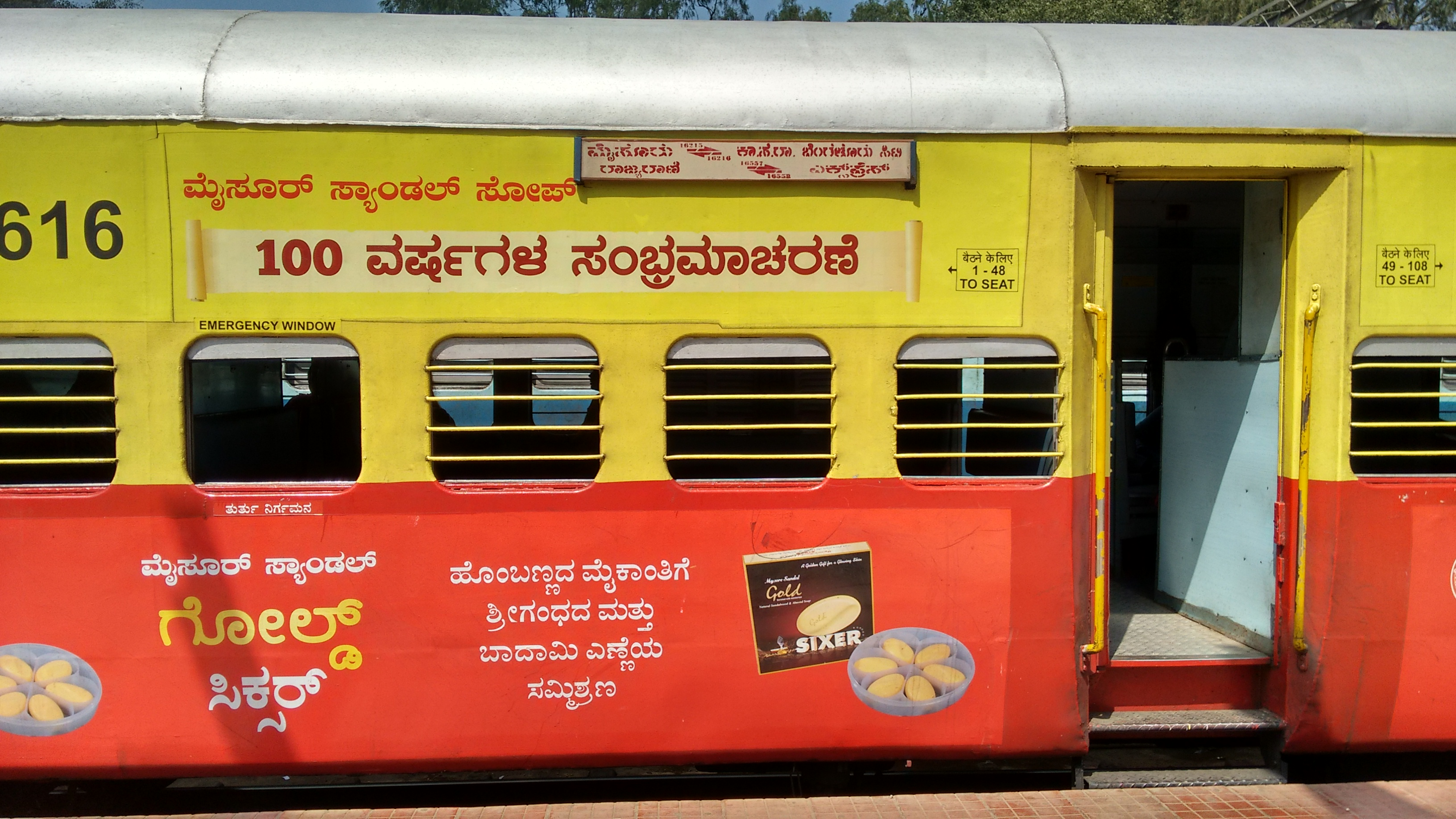

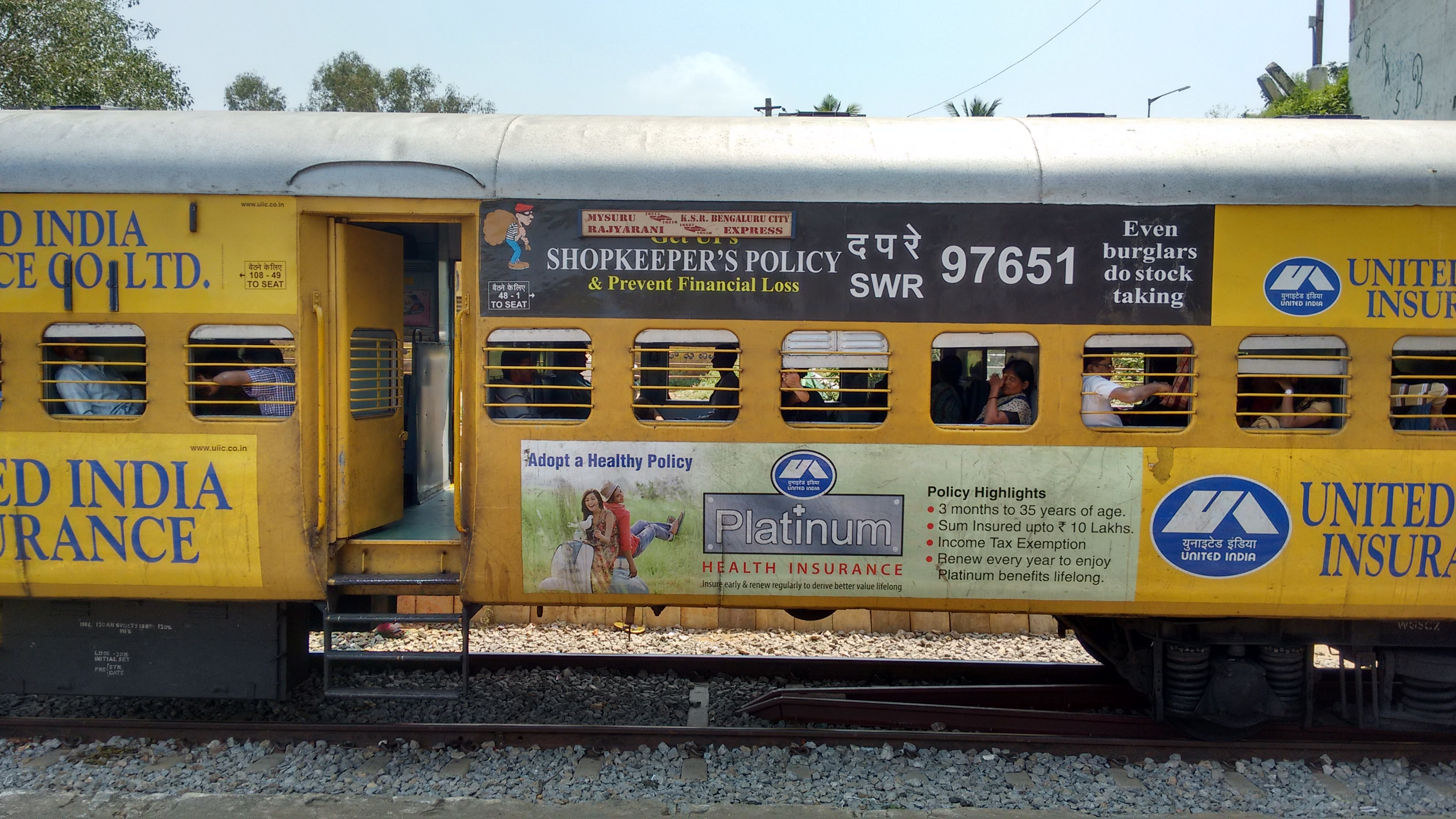

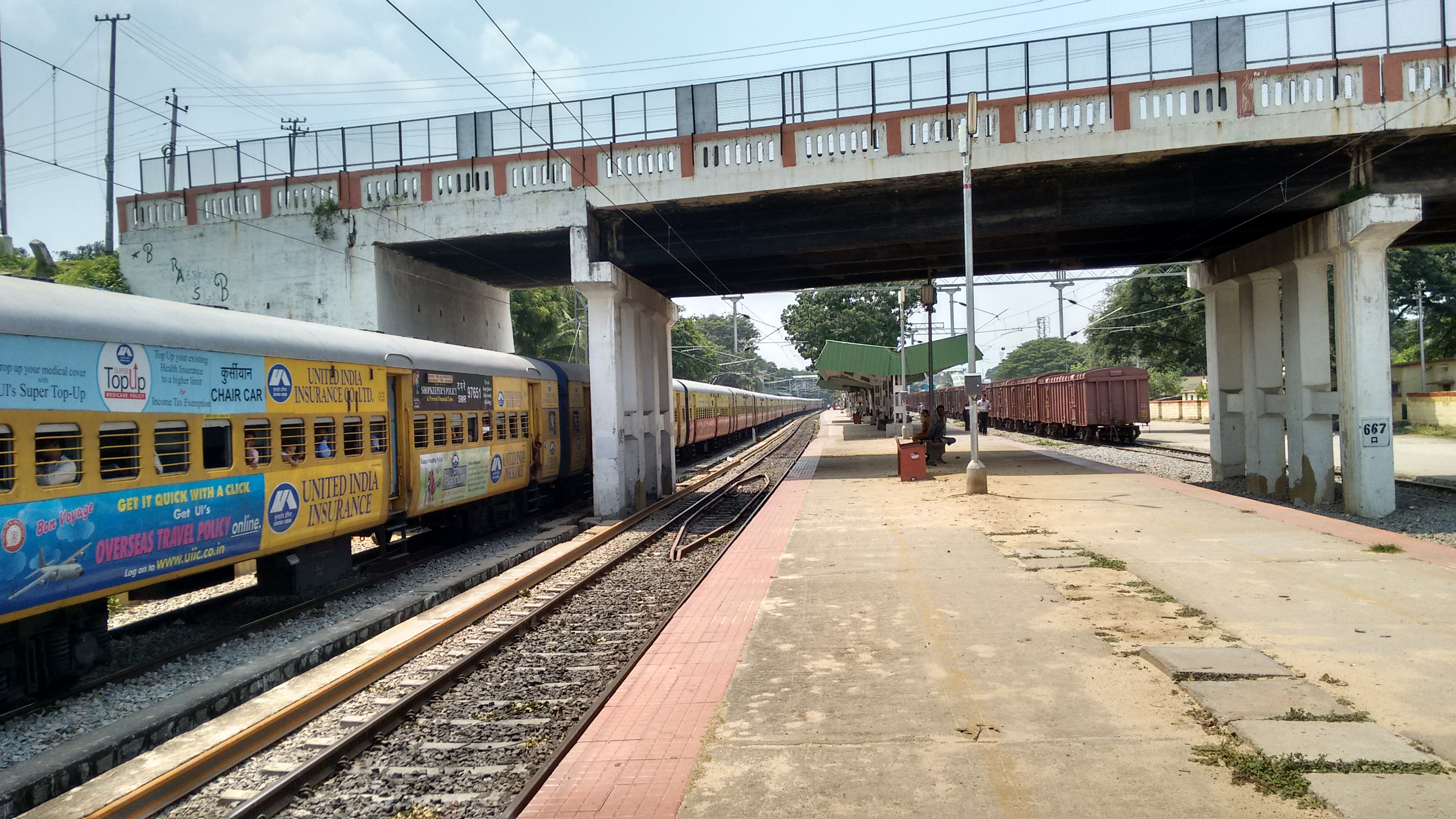

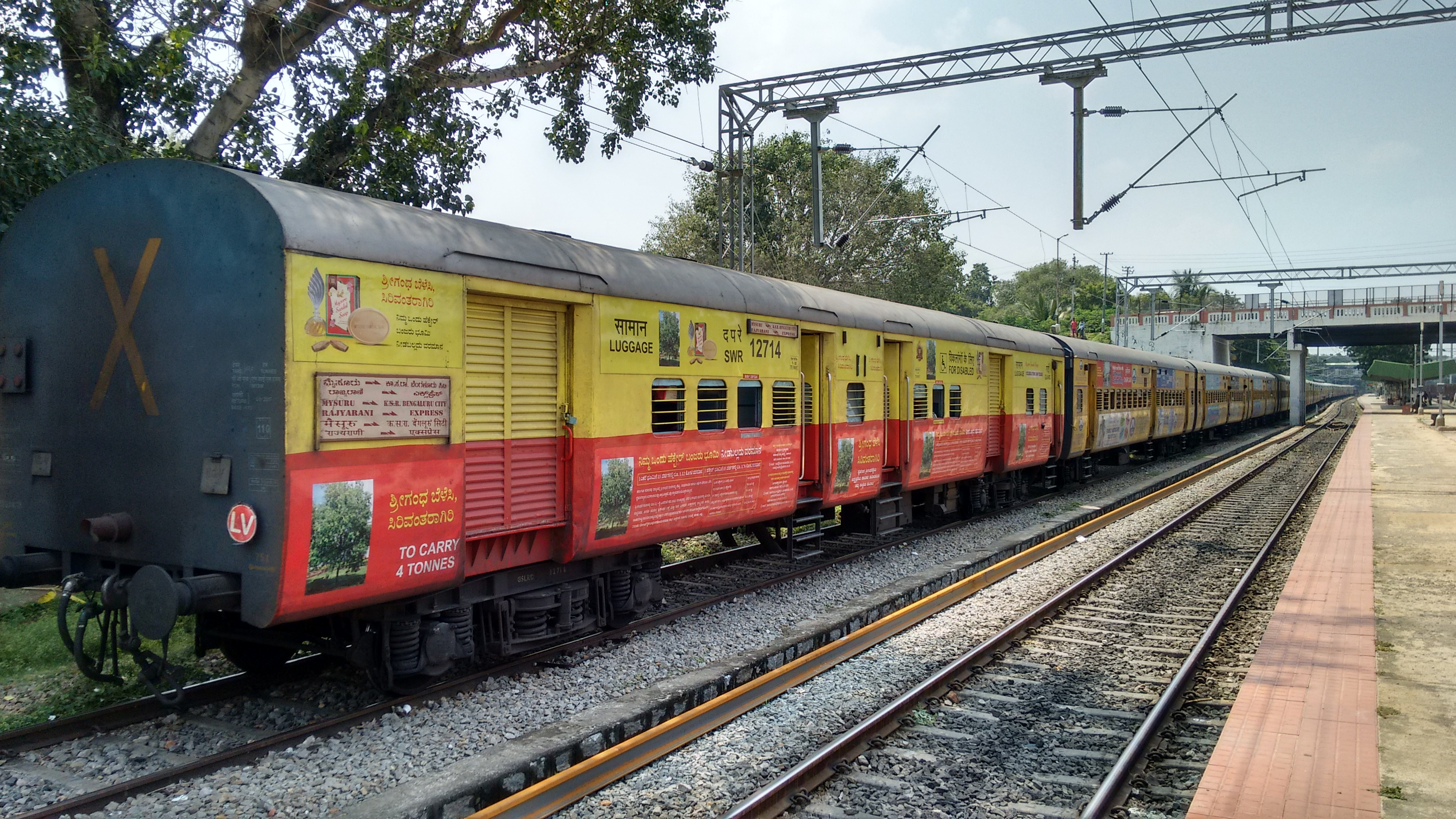

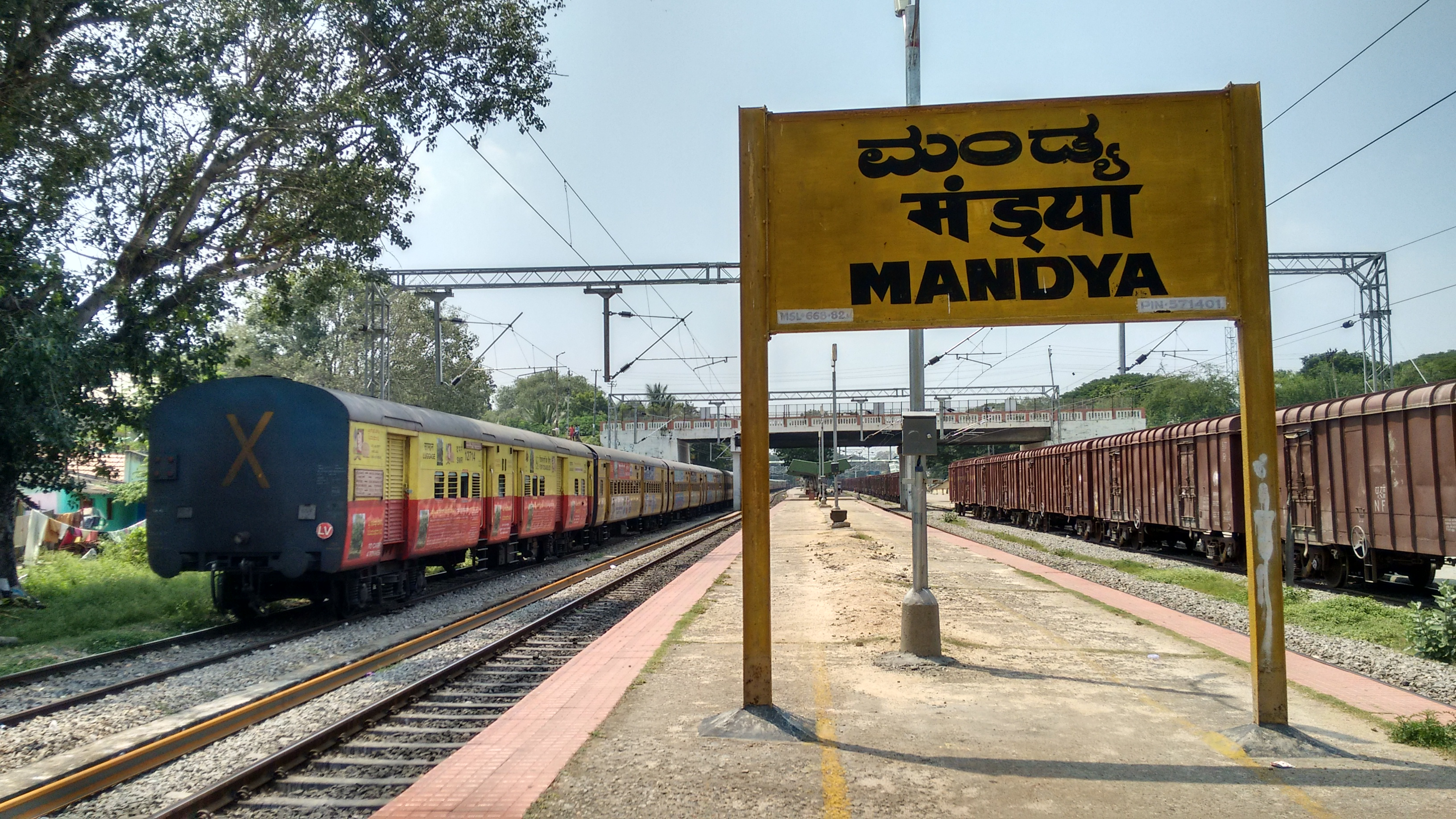

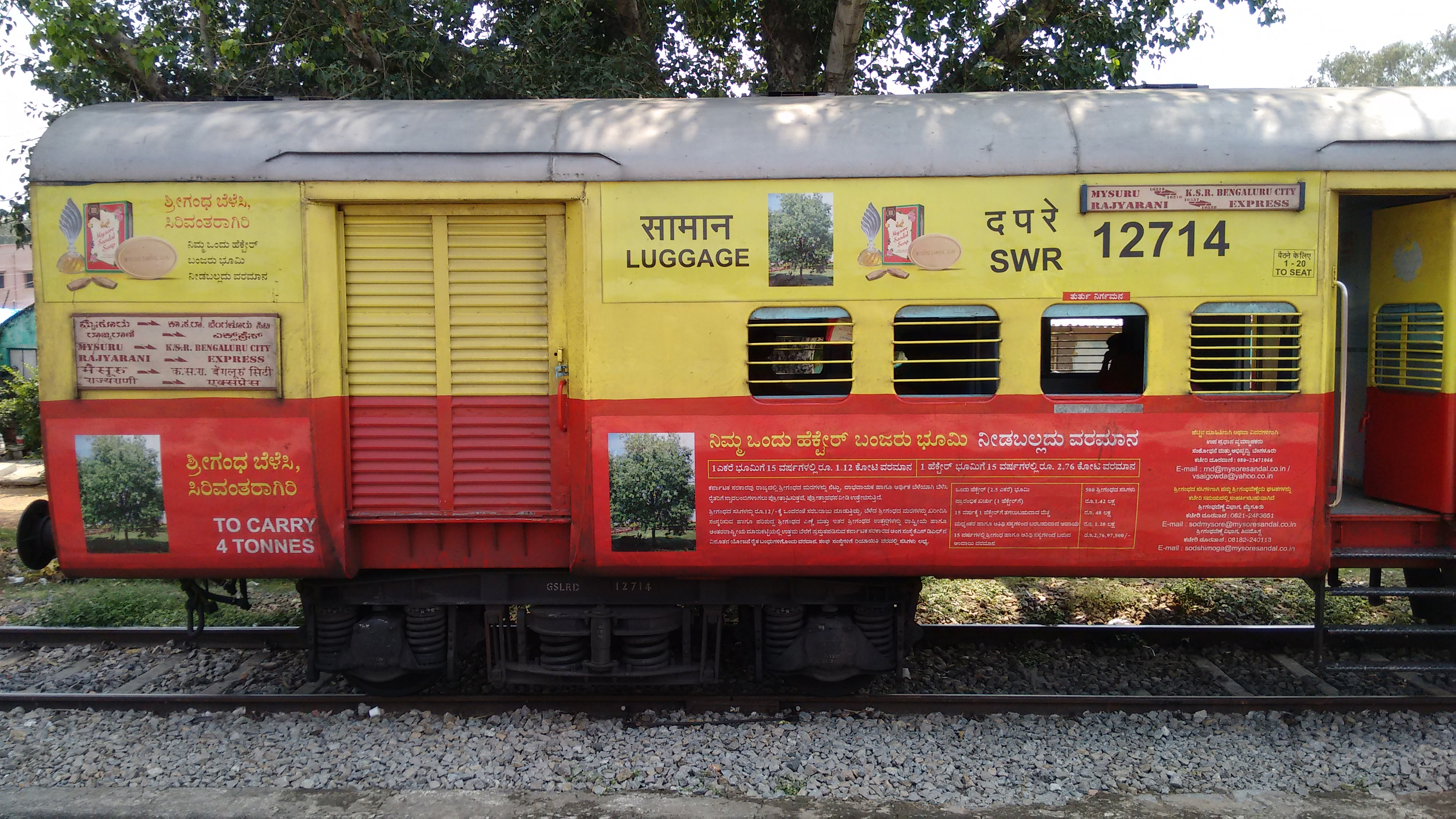
