= Mumbai CSMT–Thiruvananthapuram Weekly Express =

Express train in India

Mumbai Lokmanya Tika Terminus–Thiruvananthapuram Central Weekly Express

Overview
- Service type: Express
- Locale: Maharashtra, Karnataka, Andhra Pradesh, Tamil Nadu, Kerala
- First service: 4 July 1994; 32 years ago
- Current operator: Southern Railway zone

Route
- Termini: Mumbai Lokmanya Tilak Terminus (LTT); Thiruvananthapuram Central (TVC)
- Stops: 41
- Distance travelled: 1,946 km (1,209 mi)
- Average journey time: 39h 10m
- Service frequency: Weekly
- Train number: 16331/16332

On-board services
- Classes: AC 2 tier, AC 3 tier, AC 3 tier economy, Sleeper class, General unreserved
- Seating arrangements: Yes
- Sleeping arrangements: Yes
- Auto-rack arrangements: Yes
- Catering facilities: Pantry car On-board catering E-catering
- Entertainment facilities: No
- Baggage facilities: No
- Other facilities: Below the seats

Technical
- Rolling stock: WAP-7, LHB coaches
- Track gauge: 1,676 mm (5 ft 6 in)
- Operating speed: 42 km/h (26 mph), including halts

The 16331/16332 Mumbai Lokmanya Tilak Terminus–Thiruvananthapuram Central Weekly Express is an express train belonging to Southern Railway zone that runs between Lokmanya Tilak Terminus and Thiruvananthapuram Central in India.

== Service ==
The 16331/Mumbai Lokmanya Tilak Terminus–Thiruvananthapuram Central Weekly Express has an average speed of 50 km/h and covers 1946 km in 39h 10m. The 16332/Thiruvananthapuram Central–Mumbai Lokmanya Tilak Terminus Weekly Express has an average speed of 48 km/h and covers 1946 km in 40h 25m.

== Route and halts ==
The important halts of the train are:

- Mumbai Lokmanya Tilak Terminus
- Thane
- Kalyan Junction
- Karjat
- Lonavala
- Pune Junction
- Daund Junction
- Solapur
- Kalaburagi Junction
- Wadi Junction
- Mantralayam Road
- Guntakal Junction
- Dharmavaram Junction
- Krishnarajapuram
- Bangarapet Junction
- Salem Junction
- Erode Junction
- Coimbatore Junction
- Palakkad Junction
- Ernakulam Junction
- Alappuzha
- Kollam Junction
- Thiruvananthapuram Central

== Coach composition ==
The train has standard LHB rakes with a maximum speed of 130 km/h. The train consists of 23 coaches:

- 1 AC II Tier
- 6 AC III Tier
- 2 AC III Tier Economy
- 7 Sleeper coaches
- 1 Pantry car
- 4 General Unreserved
- 1 Seating cum Luggage Car
- 1 Generator Car

1+6+7+1+4+1+1=23 RAKES consists

Loco	1	2	3	4	5	6	7	8	9	10	11	12	13	14	15	16	17	18	19	20	21	22	23
	SLR	UR	UR	S1	S2	S3	S4	S5	S6	S7	PC	M2	M1	B1	B2	B3	B4	B5	B6	A1	UR	UR	EOG

(Coach Position of 16331 Express) No rake sharing. Pure LHB Coaches.

== Traction ==
An erode/KYN based WAP-7 hauls the train end to end in both directions.

== Schedule ==
- 16331 – Starts from Mumbai Lokmanya Tilak Terminus every Sunday at night 08:35 PM IST and reaches Thiruvananthapuram Central on Tuesday at morning 07:00 AM IST
- 16332 – Starts from Thiruvananthapuram Central every Saturday at morning 04:25 AM IST and reaches Mumbai Lokmanya Tilak Terminus on Sunday 7:15 PM IST

== See also ==
- Mumbai Lokmanya Tilak Terminus railway station
- Thiruvananthapuram Central
