= Guntur–Secunderabad Intercity Express =

Train in India

Guntur–Secunderabad Intercity Superfast Express
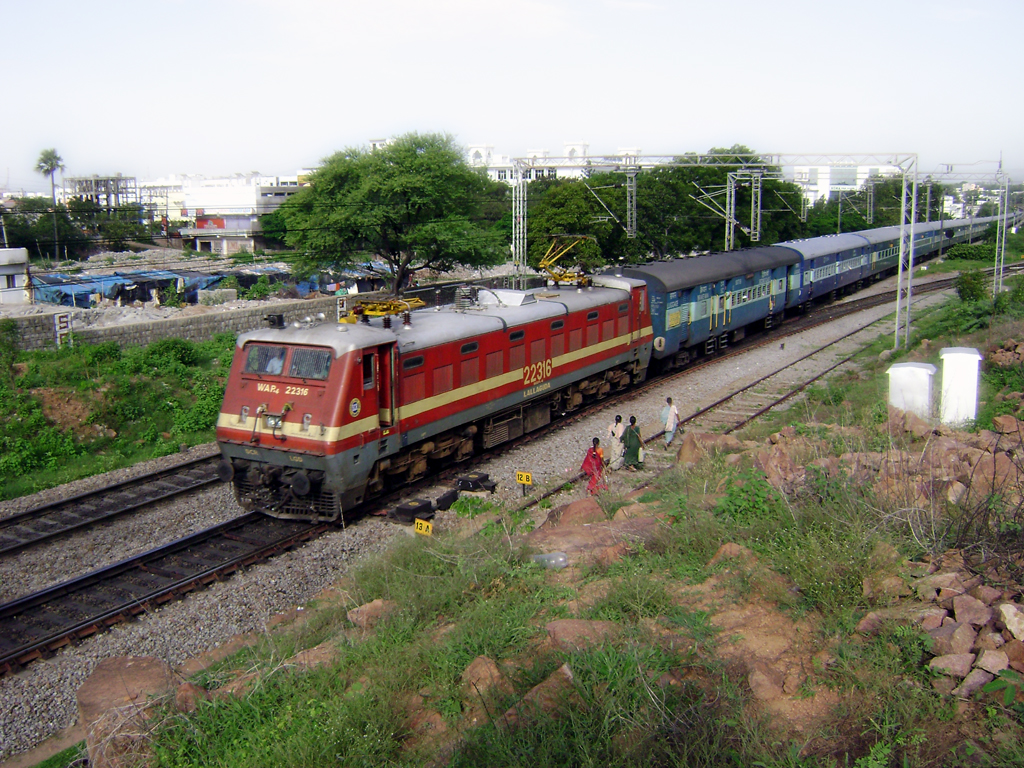
- Guntur–Secunderabad Intercity Express near Moulali in 2009

Overview
- Service type: Superfast Express
- First service: 13 February 2010; 16 years ago
- Current operator: South Central Railway

Route
- Termini: Guntur (GNT); Secunderabad (SC)
- Stops: 14
- Distance travelled: 382 km (237 mi)
- Average journey time: 6 hours 50 minutes
- Service frequency: Daily
- Train number: 12705 / 12706

On-board services
- Classes: AC Chair Car, General Unreserved, Chair car
- Seating arrangements: Yes
- Sleeping arrangements: No
- Auto-rack arrangements: Overhead racks
- Catering facilities: No
- Observation facilities: Large windows
- Baggage facilities: No
- Other facilities: Below the seats

Technical
- Rolling stock: LHB coach
- Track gauge: 1,676 mm (5 ft 6 in)
- Operating speed: 57 km/h (35 mph) average including halts.
Route map
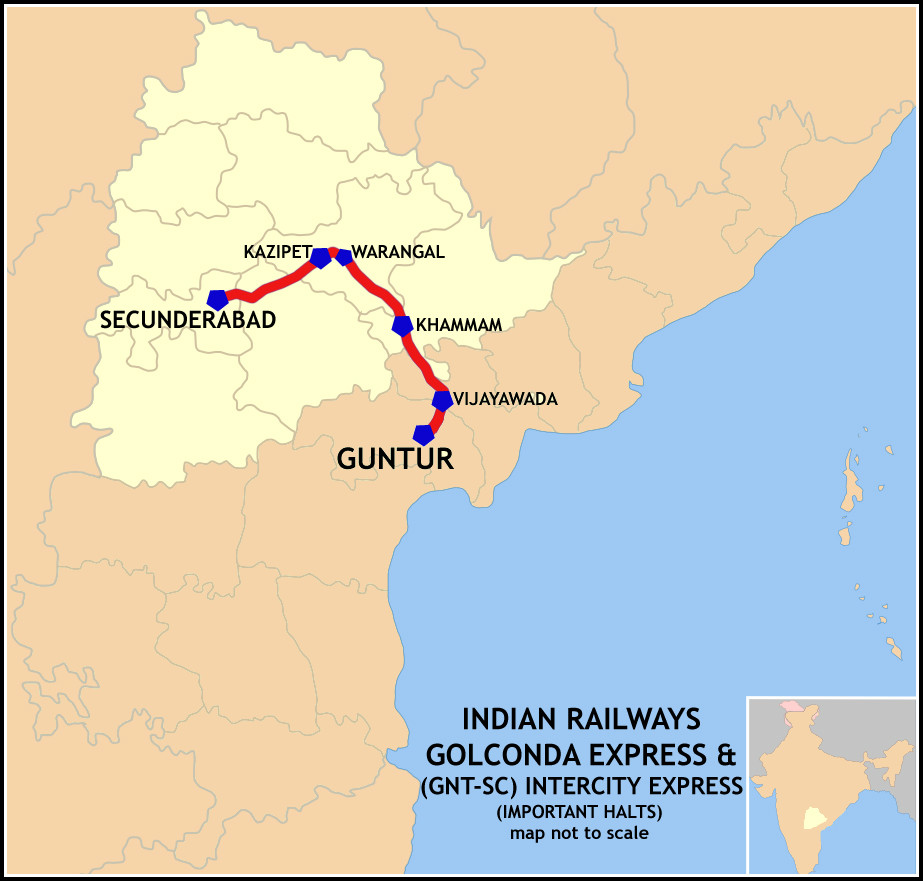

The 12705 / 12706 Guntur–Secunderabad Intercity Superfast Express is an superfast express train belonging to Indian Railways South Central Railway zone that runs between Guntur Junction and Secunderabad Junction in India.

It operates as train number 12705 from Guntur Junction to Secunderabad Junction and as train number 12706 in the reverse direction serving the states of Telangana & Andhra Pradesh.

== Coaches ==
The 12705 / 06 Guntur Junction – Secunderabad Junction Intercity Express has one AC Chair Car, six Non AC chair car, 11 general unreserved & two SLR (seating with luggage rake) coaches . It does not carry a pantry car coach.

As is customary with most train services in India, coach composition may be amended at the discretion of Indian Railways depending on demand.

== Service ==
The 12705 Guntur Junction - Secunderabad Junction Intercity Express covers the distance of 382 km (237 mi) in 6 hours 50 mins (56 km/h) and in 6 hours 45 mins as the 12706 Secunderabad Junction - Guntur Junction Intercity Express (57 km/h).

As the average speed of the train is equal than 55 km/h (34 mph), as per railway rules, its fare doesn't includes a Superfast surcharge.

== Routing ==
The 12705 / 06 Guntur Junction – Secunderabad Junction Intercity Express runs from Guntur Junction via Vijayawada Junction, khammam, Warangal to Secunderabad Junction.

== Traction ==
As the route is electrified, a Lallaguda based WAP-7 electric locomotive pulls the train to its destination.
