= Gorakhpur–Lucknow Intercity Express =

Overview
- Service type: Express
- First service: 24 December 2003; 22 years ago
- Current operator: North Eastern Railway

Route
- Termini: Gorakhpur Junction (GKP); Lucknow Junction (LJN)
- Stops: 11
- Distance travelled: 276.8 km (172 mi)
- Average journey time: 5 hours 30 minutes
- Service frequency: Daily
- Train number: 15031 / 15032

On-board services
- Classes: CC, 2S, UR/GEN
- Seating arrangements: Yes
- Sleeping arrangements: No
- Catering facilities: On-board catering, E-catering
- Observation facilities: Large windows
- Baggage facilities: Available

Technical
- Rolling stock: LHB coach
- Track gauge: 1,676 mm (5 ft 6 in)
- Operating speed: 110 km/h (68 mph) Max speed 55 km/h (34 mph) average speed

The 15031 / 15032 Gorakhpur–Lucknow Intercity Express is a Express train belonging to Indian Railways North Eastern Railway zone that runs between Gorakhpur Junction and Lucknow Junction in India via Basti and Gonda Junction.

It operates as train number 15031 from Gorakhpur Junction to Lucknow Junction and as train number 15032 in the reverse direction, serving the state of Uttar Pradesh. Originally, it was operating as train number 12531/12532, but however, on 4 January 2025, it was downgraded from Superfast to original Express category.

== Coaches ==
The 15031 / 15032 Gorakhpur Junction–Lucknow Junction Intercity Sf Express has 5 AC Chair Car, 10 Non-AC chair car, 6 general unreserved and 2 Generator cars. It does not carry a pantry car.

As is customary with most train services in India, coach composition may be amended at the discretion of Indian Railways depending on demand. It has been LHB-fied by Northern Eastern Railway on 28 March 2019 to enhance safety, speed, reliability & comfortable journey. After revised structure it gets 2 generator cum luggage car, 10 non AC chair car, 5 AC chair car, 5 general unreserved class.

== Service ==
The 15031 Gorakhpur Junction–Lucknow Junction Intercity Sf Express covers the distance of 276.8 km (172 mi) in 5 hours 30 mins (55 km/h) & in 5 hours 30 mins as the 15032 Lucknow Junction–Gorakhpur Junction Intercity Sf Express (55 km/h).

As the average speed of the train is equal than 55 km/h (34 mph), as per railway rules, its fare doesn't include a Superfast surcharge.

== Routing ==
The 15031 / 15032 Gorakhpur–Lucknow Intercity Sf Express runs from Gorakhpur Junction via Khalilabad, Basti, Babhnan, Mankapur Junction, Gonda Junction, Barabanki Junction, Badshahnagar to Lucknow Junction.

== Traction ==
As the route is fully electrified, a Ghaziabad / Kanpur-based WAP-7 (HOG)-equipped locomotive pulls the train to its destination.
