= Chennai Central–Nagercoil Weekly Superfast Express =

Train in India

Overview
- Service type: Superfast
- Current operator: Southern Railway zone

Route
- Termini: Chennai Central (MAS); Nagercoil Junction (NCJ)
- Stops: 18
- Distance travelled: 923 km (574 mi)
- Average journey time: 16h 45m
- Service frequency: Weekly (Note: Runs one days in a week for every direction.)
- Train number: 12689/12690

On-board services
- Classes: AC 1st, AC 3 Tier, Sleeper class, General Unreserved
- Seating arrangements: No
- Sleeping arrangements: Yes
- Catering facilities: On-board catering E-catering
- Observation facilities: ICF-CBC rake
- Entertainment facilities: No
- Baggage facilities: No
- Other facilities: Below the seats

Technical
- Rolling stock: 2
- Track gauge: 1,676 mm (5 ft 6 in)
- Operating speed: 55 km/h (34 mph), including halts

The Chennai Central–Nagercoil Superfast Express is a Superfast train belonging to Southern Railway zone that runs between Chennai Central and Nagercoil in India. It is currently being operated with 12689/12690 train numbers on a weekly basis.

== Service ==
The 12689/Chennai Central Nagercoil Superfast Express has an average speed of 55 km/h and covers 923 km in 16h 45m. The 12690/Nagercoil–Chennai Central Superfast Express has an average speed of 55 km/h and covers 923 km in 16h 45m.

== Route and halts ==
The important halts of the train are:

- Chennai Central
- Arakkonam Junction
- Katpadi Junction
- Jolarpettai Junction
- Salem Junction
- Namakkal
- Karur Junction
- Tiruchirappalli Junction
- Madurai Junction
- Tirunelveli Junction
- Nagercoil Junction

== Coach composition ==
The train has standard ICF rakes with a maximum speed of 110 km/h. The train consists of 14 coaches:

- 1 AC 1st class
- 2 AC III Tier
- 9 Sleeper coaches
- 6 General Unreserved
- 2 Seating cum Luggage Rake

== Traction ==
Both trains are hauled by a Royapuram Loco Shed-based WAP-7 or WAP-4 electric locomotive from Chennai to Salem. From Salem, train is hauled by an ITARSI Loco Shed-based WAP-4 diesel locomotive.

== See also ==
- Chennai Egmore railway station
- Nagercoil Junction railway station
- Chennai Egmore–Kanniyakumari Superfast Express
- Chennai Egmore–Nagercoil Weekly Superfast Express
- Tambaram–Nagercoil Superfast Express
- Island Express
