= Yesvantpur–Chennai Central Superfast Express =

Express Indian railway

Yesvantpur - Chennai Central Superfast Express
Overview
- Service type: Superfast Express
- Current operator: South Western Railway zone

Route
- Termini: Yesvantpur Junction (YPR); Chennai Central (MAS)
- Stops: 12
- Distance travelled: 370 km (230 mi)
- Average journey time: 6 hours 50 minutes
- Service frequency: Weekly (Note: Runs one days in a week for every direction.)
- Train number: 12291/12292

On-board services
- Classes: AC 2 tier, AC 3 tier, Sleeper Class, General Unreserved
- Seating arrangements: No
- Sleeping arrangements: Yes
- Catering facilities: No
- Observation facilities: LHB coches
- Entertainment facilities: No
- Baggage facilities: Below the seats

Technical
- Rolling stock: 2
- Track gauge: 1,676 mm (5 ft 6 in)
- Operating speed: 56 km/h (35 mph)

Yesvantpur - Chennai Central Superfast Express is a Superfast Express train of the Indian Railways connecting Yesvantpur Junction in Karnataka and Chennai Central of Tamil Nadu. It is currently being operated with 12291/12292 train numbers on a weekly basis.

== Service ==
The 12291/Yesvantpur-Chennai Weekly SF Express has an average speed of 55 km/h and covers 370 km in 6 hrs 50 mins. 12292/Chennai-Yesvantpur Weekly SF Express has an average speed of 55 km/h and covers 370 km in 6 hrs 50 mins.

== Coach composite ==
The train has LHB rakes with max speed of 130 km/h. The train consists of 21 coaches:

- 1 AC II Tier
- 2 AC III Tier
- 14 sleeper coaches
- 1 general
- 1 pantry car
- 2 second-class luggage/parcel vans with generators

== Rake sharing ==
The train shares its rake with 16501/16502 Yesvantpur Ahmedabad Weekly Express.

== See also ==
- Yesvantpur Junction railway station
- Chennai Central railway station
- Yesvantpur Ahmedabad Weekly Express
