= Tungabhadra Express =

Train in India

Overview
- Service type: Express
- Locale: Andhra Pradesh & Telangana
- First service: 5 July 1984; 41 years ago
- Current operator: South Central Railway

Route
- Termini: Kurnool City (KRNT); Kacheguda (KCG)
- Stops: 11
- Distance travelled: 236 km (147 mi)
- Average journey time: 4 hours 55 minutes
- Service frequency: Daily
- Train number: 17023 / 17024

On-board services
- Classes: AC 3 Tier, Second Class Seating, General Unreserved
- Seating arrangements: Yes
- Sleeping arrangements: Yes
- Auto-rack arrangements: Overhead racks
- Catering facilities: Available except pantry car
- Observation facilities: Large windows
- Baggage facilities: Available
- Other facilities: Below the seats

Technical
- Rolling stock: LHB coach
- Track gauge: 1,676 mm (5 ft 6 in)
- Operating speed: 49 km/h (30 mph) average including halts.
Route map
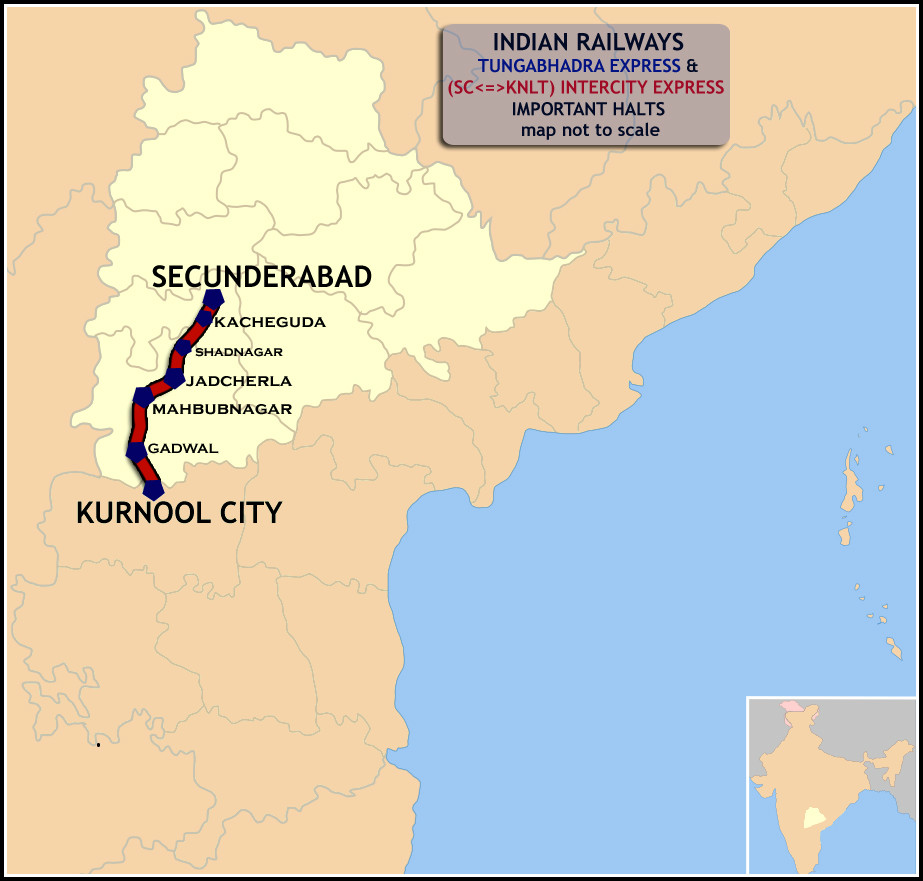

The 17023 / 17024 Tungabhadra Express is an express train in India which runs between Kurnool City in Andhra Pradesh and Kacheguda in Telangana. This train is named after the River Tungabhadra. The Secunderabad Division of the South Central Railway division of the Indian Railways administers this train.

== Numbering ==
Train number 17023 runs from Secunderabad Jn to Kurnool City while 17024 runs from Kurnool City to Secunderabad Jn.

== Rake sharing ==
This train has rake sharing with Kacheguda Nagarsol Passenger.

== Route ==
The train starts from Secunderabad Jn at 07:30 hours and reaches Kurnool City at 12:30 hours the same day. In the return direction it leaves Kurnool City at 15:00 hours and reaches Secunderabad Jn at 19:55 hours the same day. The train runs via Kacheguda, Malakpet, Falaknuma, Shadnagar, Jadcherla, Mahabubnagar, Wanaparthy, Gadwal.

== Loco ==
As the entire route is electrified it is hauled by a WAP-7 electric locomotive of Lallaguda Loco Shed.

== Classes ==
The 16-coach composition contains 1 A/C Chair car, 8 Second sitting, 7 Unreserved and 2 SLR.

== See also ==
- Padmavati Express
