= Bandra Rajdhani Express =

Overview
- Service type: Rajdhani Express
- First service: 16 October 2017; 7 years ago
- Current operator(s): Western Railways

Route
- Termini: Bandra Terminus; Hazrat Nizamuddin
- Stops: 3
- Distance travelled: 1,367 km (849 mi)
- Average journey time: 13 hours 55 minutes
- Service frequency: Tri-weekly
- Train number(s): 09003 / 09004

On-board services
- Class(es): AC 1st Class, AC 2 Tier, AC 3 Tier
- Seating arrangements: No
- Sleeping arrangements: Yes
- Catering facilities: Pantry car
- Observation facilities: LHB

Technical
- Track gauge: 1,676 mm (5 ft 6 in)
- Operating speed: 98 km/h (61 mph) average 130 km/h (81 mph) maximum

The 09003/09004 Bandra Rajdhani Express was a superfast train of Rajdhani service linking the National Capital of Delhi to Bandra in Mumbai. With an average speed of 98 kmph, this was the fastest Rajdhani Indian railways ever operated .

It operates with a maximum speed of 130 km/h (80 mph) and an average speed of 98 km/h.

== History ==
It was introduced on 16 October 2017 connecting the Bandra Terminus and Hazrat Nizamuddin for a 3-month Period.

It was given a Tri-weekly run. It was introduced with objective to cut the travel time between Mumbai and Delhi to under 14 Hours.

Mumbai Rajdhani takes 16 Hours 45 minutes while the August Kranti Rajdhani takes 17 Hours.

It had 2 Locomotives, 1 on front and other on back used Push-pull technique for faster acceleration.

It was hauled by Ghaziabad-based WAP7 end to end.

== Route ==
Bandra Terminus - Surat - Vadodara - Ratlam - Kota - Mathura - Hazrat Nizamuddin

== Haults ==
It had only 3 stops on its 1,367 km journey.

Surat

Vadodara

Kota

== Service ==
Bandra Rajdhani Express usually reached its destination late.

In January 2018, Bandra Rajdhani Express was further extended till April 2018 for 3 months.

In May 2018, Its run was again extended till July 2018.

In July 2018, Rajdhani again extended till September 2018.

== Termination ==
In October 2018, Bandra Terminus Hazrat Nizamuddin Rajdhani Express was terminated due to frequently reaching Bandra delayed with low occupancy.
