= Kolkata–Patna Express =

Indian train

Overview
- Service type: Express
- First service: 1 July 2014; 11 years ago
- Last service: Discontinued on 19 May 2020
- Current operator: Eastern Railway zone

Route
- Termini: Kolkata (KOAA); Patna Junction (PNBE)
- Stops: 40
- Distance travelled: 548 km (341 mi)
- Average journey time: 12h 35m
- Service frequency: Daily (Note: Runs seven days in a week for every direction.)
- Train number: 13131/13132

On-board services
- Classes: AC III Tier, AC III Tier, Sleeper Coaches, General Unreserved
- Seating arrangements: No
- Sleeping arrangements: Yes
- Catering facilities: On-board catering E-catering
- Observation facilities: ICF coach
- Entertainment facilities: No
- Baggage facilities: No
- Other facilities: Below the seats

Technical
- Rolling stock: 2
- Track gauge: 1,676 mm (5 ft 6 in)
- Operating speed: 44 km/h (27 mph), including halts

The Kolkata–Patna Express was an Express train belonging to Eastern Railway zone that ran between Kolkata and Patna Junction in India. It operated with 13131/13132 train numbers on daily basis. Eastern Railway cancelled its operations permanently from 19 May 2020.

== Service ==
The 13131/Kolkata–Patna Express had average speed of 44 km/h and covered 548 km in 12h 35m. 13132/Patna–Kolkata Express had average speed of 39 km/h and covered 548 km in 14h 10m.

== Route and halts ==
The important halts of the train were:

- Kolkata
- Naihati Junction
- Bandel Junction
- Barddhaman Junction
- Durgapur
- Asansol Junction
- Chittaranjan
- Madhupur Junction
- Jasidih Junction
- Jhajha
- Kiul Junction
- Hathidah Junction
- Bakhtiyarpur Junction
- Fatuha Junction
- Banka Ghat
- Patna Sahib
- Gulzarbagh
- Rajendra Nagar Terminal
- Patna Junction

== Coach composition ==
The train had standard ICF rakes with a maximum speed of 110 km/h. The train consisted of 18 coaches :

- 3 AC III Tier
- 4 Sleeper coaches
- 7 General
- 2 Seating cum Luggage Rake

== Traction ==
Both trains were hauled by an Asansol Loco Shed based WAM-4 or WAG-5P electric locomotive from Kolkata to Patna and vice versa.

== See also ==
- Kolkata railway station
- Patna Junction railway station
- Kolkata Shalimar–Patna Duronto Express
- Kolkata–Patna Garib Rath Express
