= Chamundi Express =

Train in India

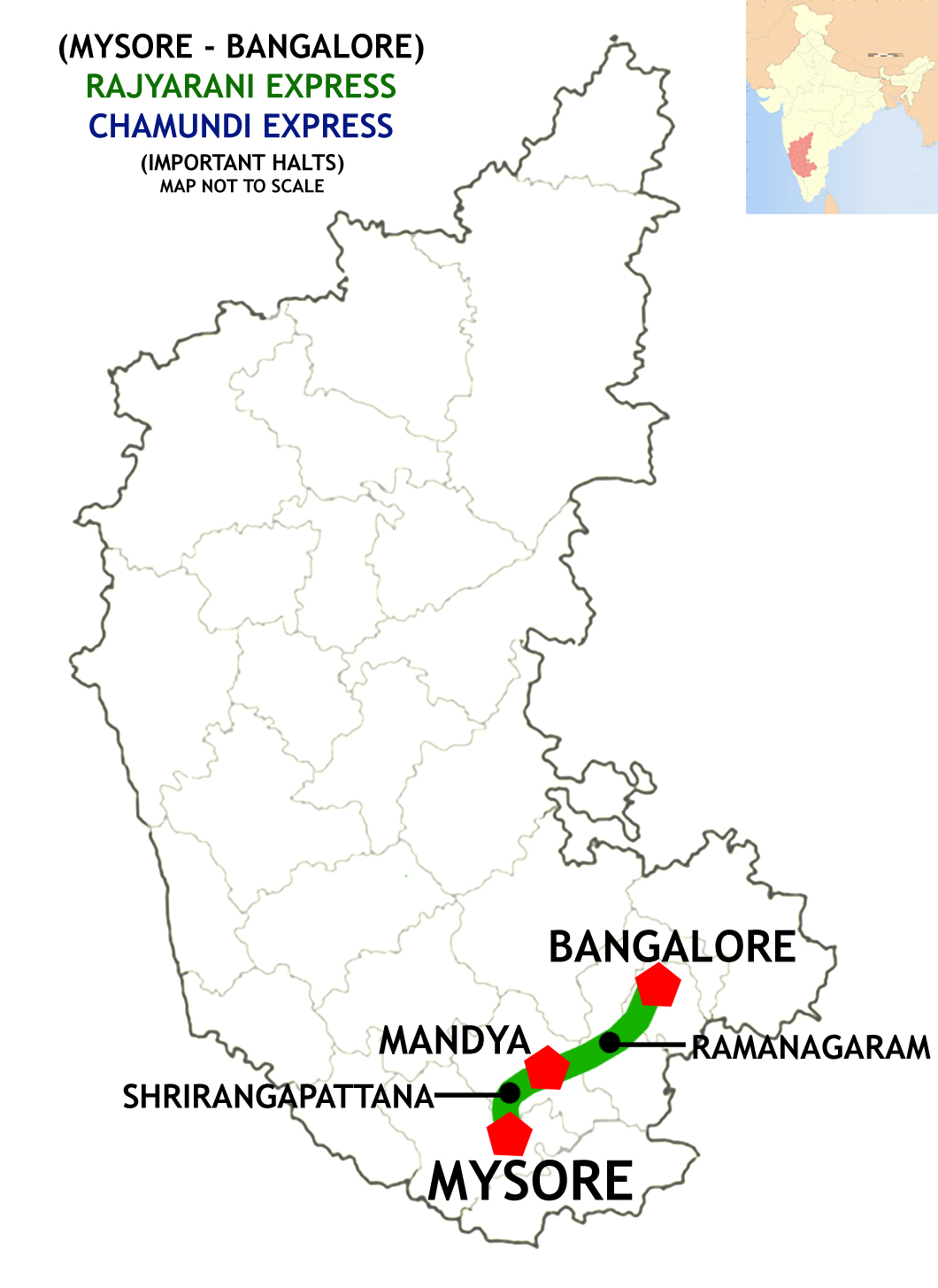
Chamundi Express (Mysore - Bangalore) Route map

Chamundi Express is a daily commuter train between Mysore and Bangalore. This train leaves Mysore at 7 AM to reach Bangalore City at 9:30 AM. Returning it leaves Bangalore City at 6:25 PM and reaches Mysore at 9:05 PM.

Post the restoration after COVID-19, the train is being run using MEMU rake instead of conventional rake.

== Relevance ==
This train traces its name to mythology. Chamundeshwari is an incarnation of Adi Parashakti who destroyed the demon Mahishasura. At the spot believed to be the place where Chamundeshwari killed Mahishasura, a temple was constructed there, currently located in Chamundi Hills in Mysuru. The Maharaja of Mysore and the royal family of Mysore worshipped Chamundeshwari as their patron deity. The temple is believed to be a Shakta pitha as the hair of Goddess Sati fell there

== Gallery ==
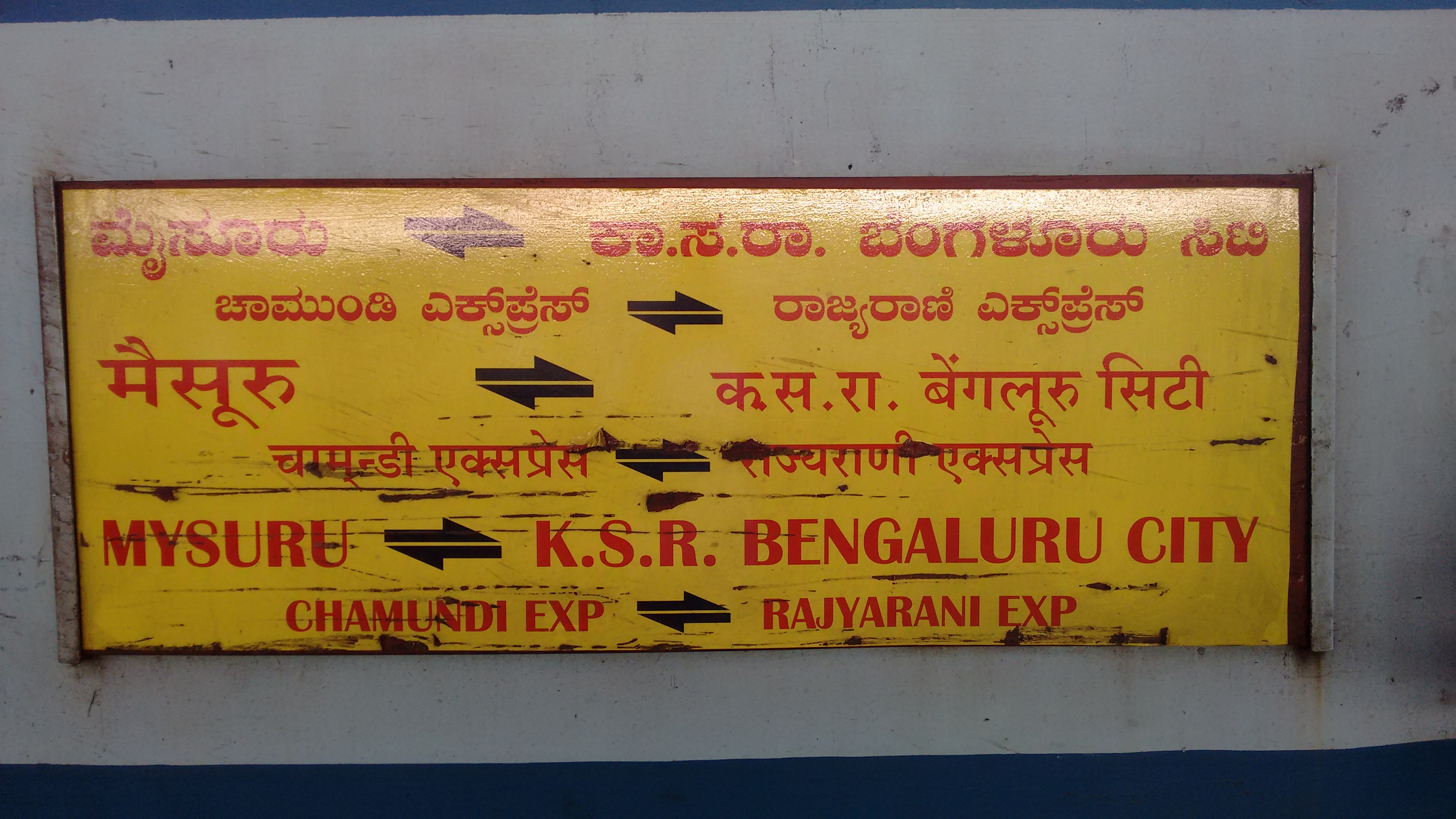

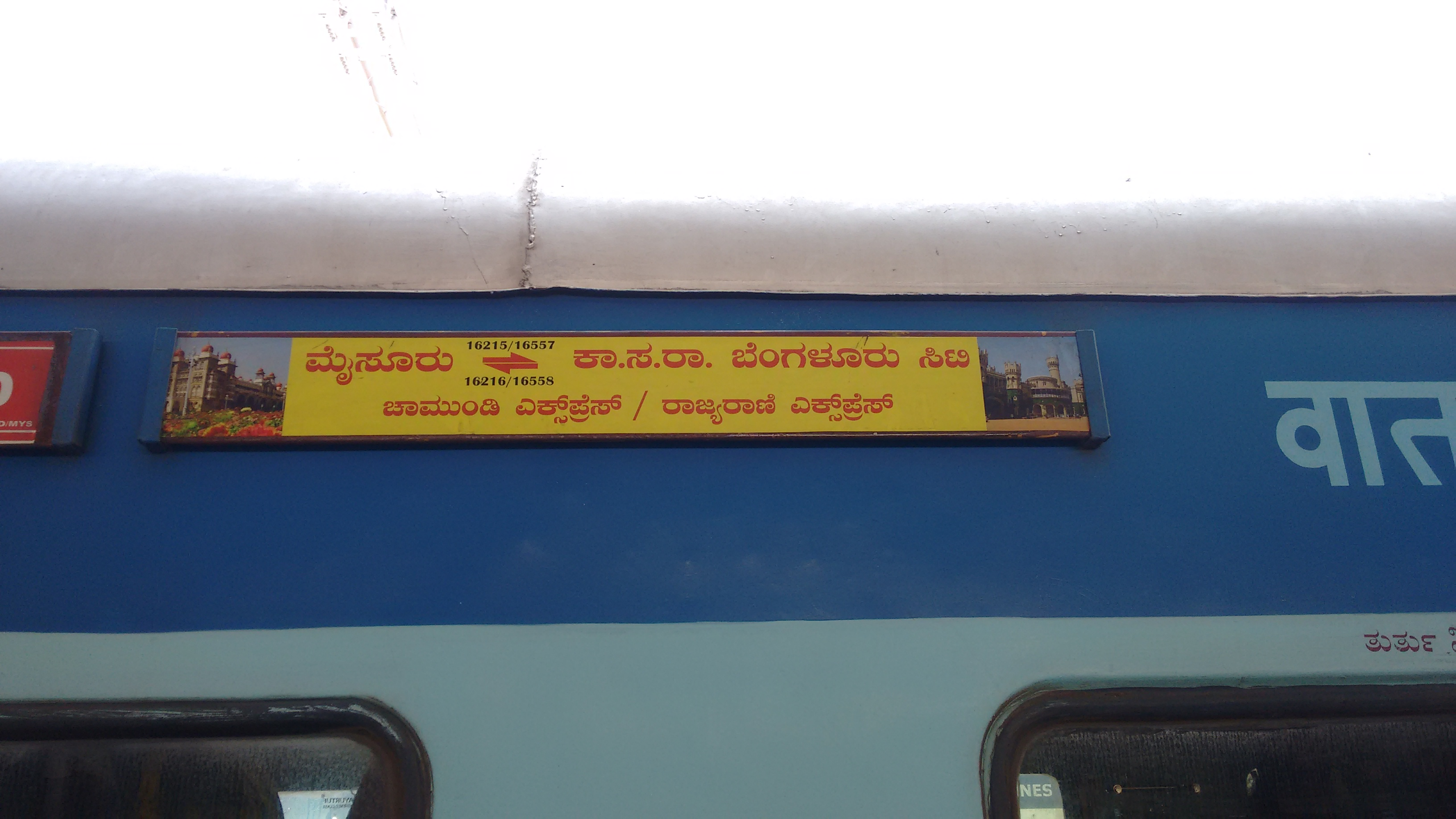

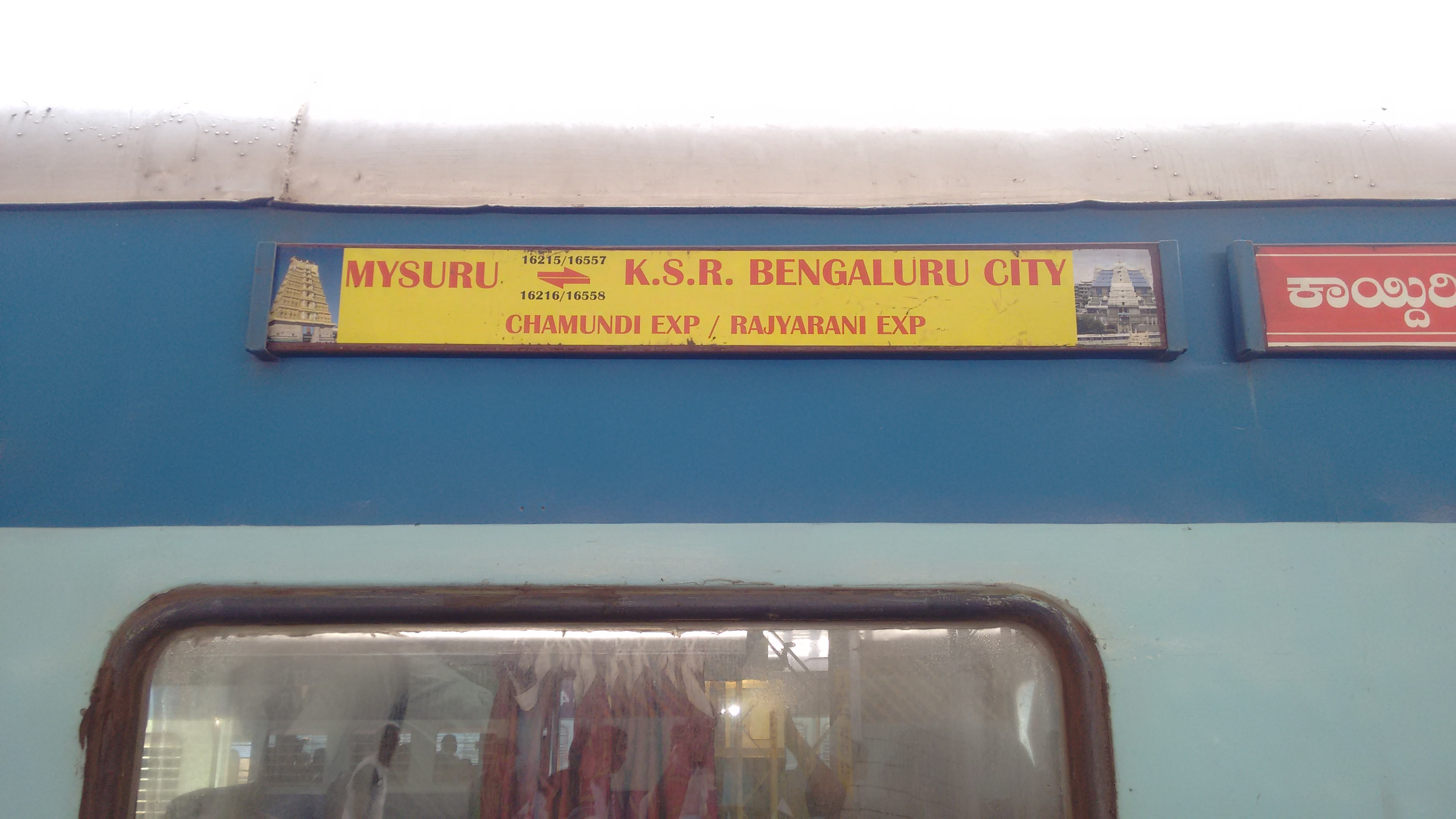

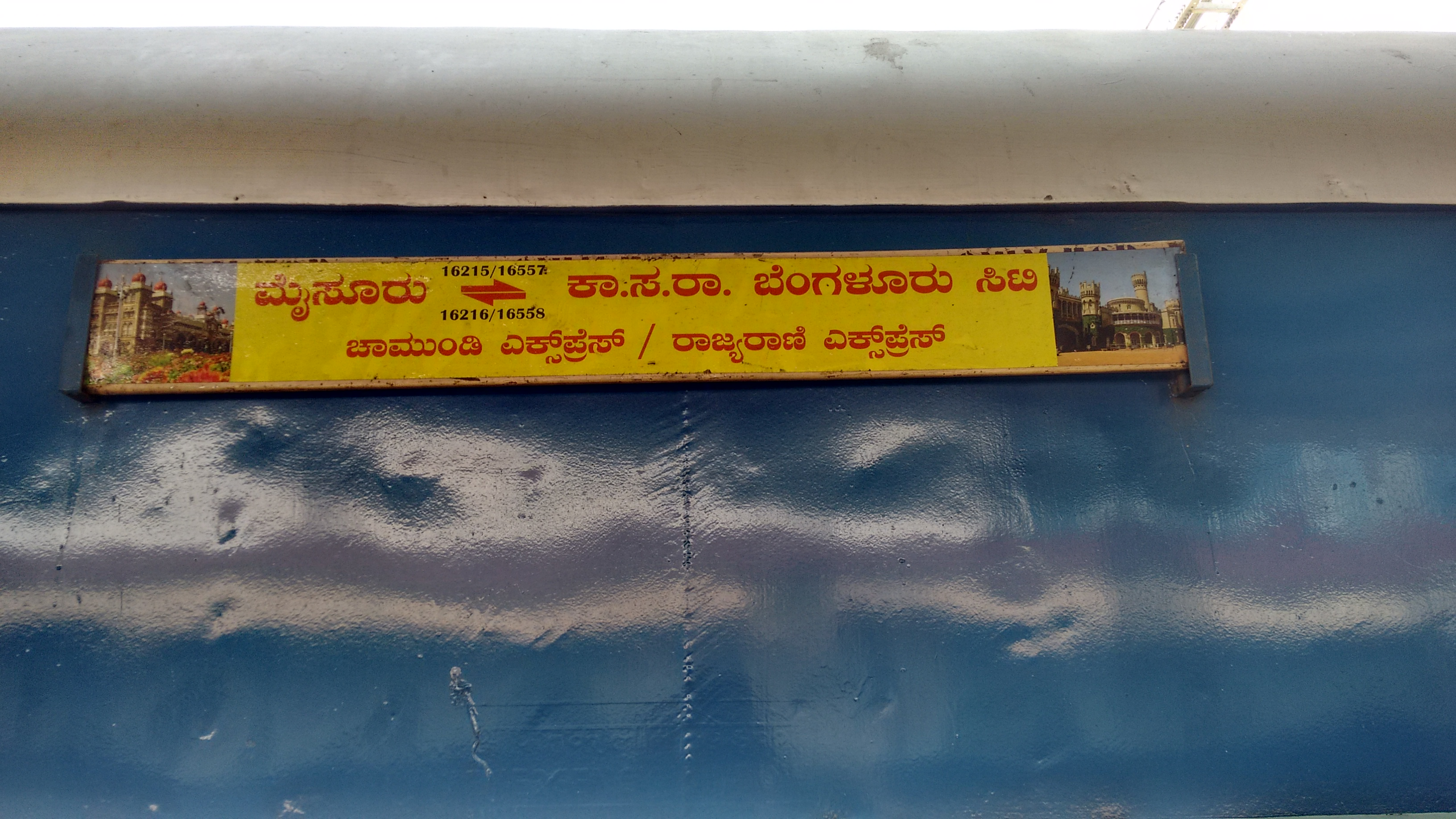

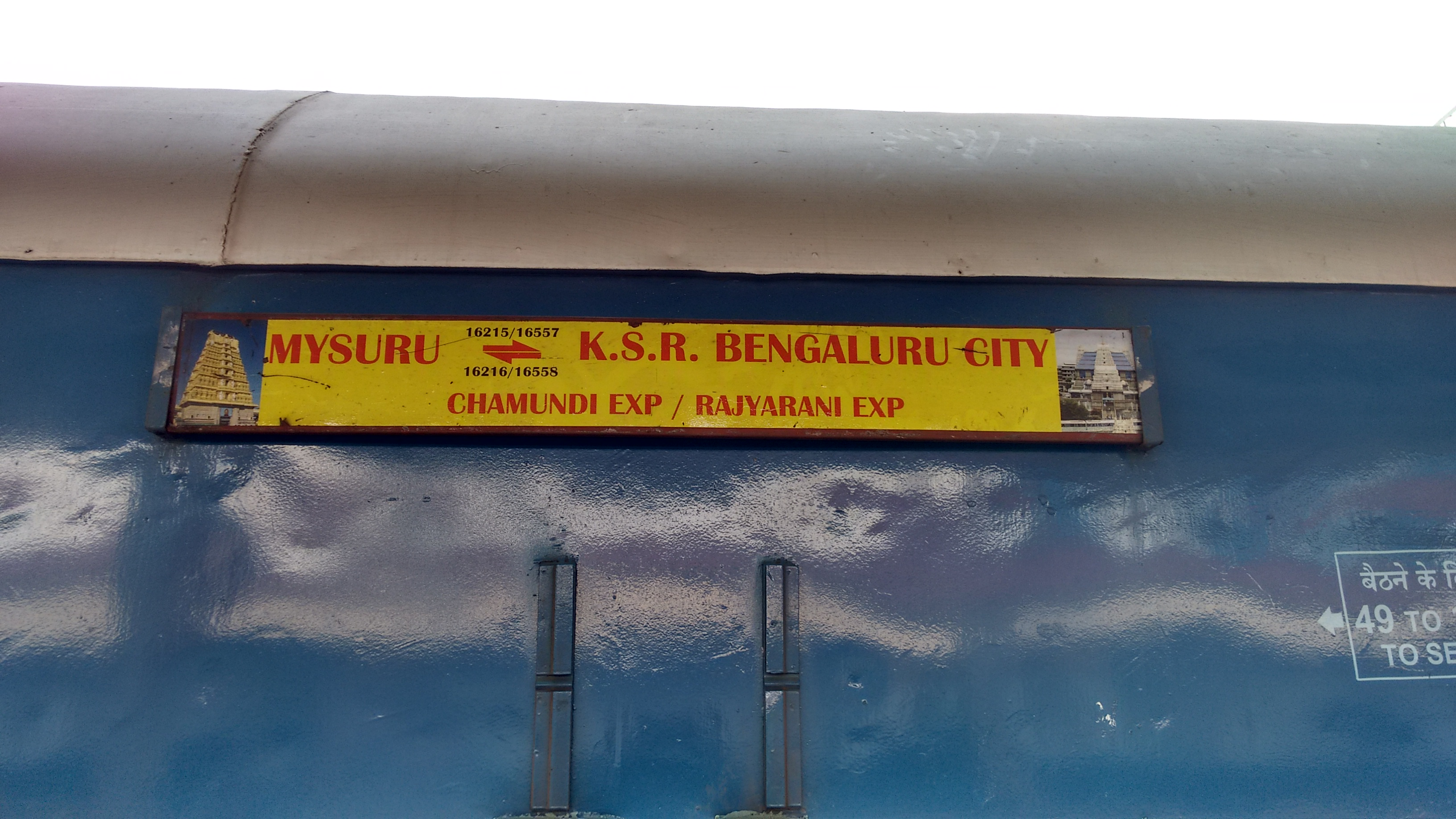

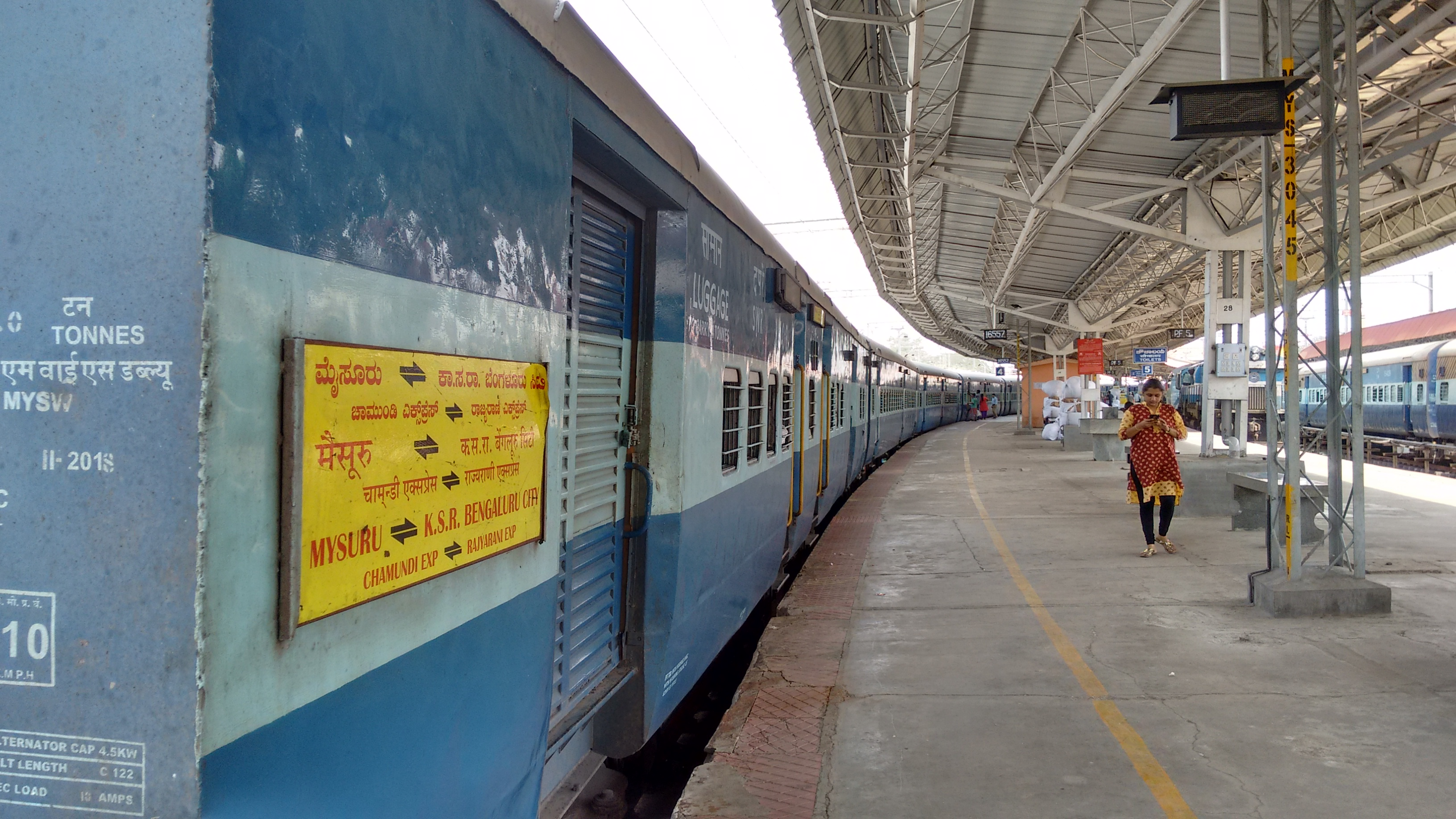
