= List of trains run by Indian Railways =

This is a list of trains run by Indian Railways.

== A ==
- Abohar-Jodhpur-Bathinda Express
- Adilabad–Hazur Sahib Nanded Express
- Agartala–SMVT Bengaluru Humsafar Express
- Ahmedabad–Howrah Superfast Express
- Ahmedabad–Kolkata Express
- Ahmedabad–Jammu Tawi Express
- Ahmedabad–Yesvantpur Weekly Express
- Ajmer–Amritsar Express
- Ajmer–Chandigarh Garib Rath Express
- Ajmer–Hazrat Nizamuddin Jan Shatabdi Express
- Alipurduar–Kamakhya Intercity Express
- Allahabad–Haridwar Express
- Allahabad–Jaipur Express
- Allahabad–New Delhi Humsafar Express
- Amravati–Jabalpur Superfast Express
- Amritsar–Chandigarh Superfast Express
- Amritsar–Haridwar Jan Shatabdi Express
- Amritsar Mail
- Amritsar Shatabdi Express
- Asansol–Mumbai CSMT Superfast Express
- Amritsar–Attari DEMU

=== Notable Names ===
- AC Express
- Amrit Bharat Express
- Agnibina Express
- Ahilyanagari Express
- Ahimsa Express
- Ajanta Express
- Akal Takht Express
- Ala Hazrat Express (via Ahmedabad)
- Amaravati Express
- Amarkantak Express
- Amarnath Express
- Amrapali Express
- Amrapur Aravali Express
- Amritha Express
- Anantapuri Express
- Ananya Express
- Andaman Express
- Andhra Pradesh Express
- Andhra Pradesh Sampark Kranti Express
- Anga Express
- Antyodaya Express
- Anuvrat AC Superfast Express
- Aranyak Express
- Archana Express
- Arunachal Express
- Arunachal AC Superfast Express
- Ashram Express
- Assam Mail
- August Kranti Rajdhani Express
- Avadh Assam Express
- Avantika Express
- Azad Hind Express
- Azimabad Express

== B ==
- Bandra Terminus–Bhagat Ki Kothi Express
- Bandra Terminus–Bhavnagar Terminus Express
- Bandra Terminus–Bikaner AC Superfast Express
- Bandra Terminus–Dehradun Express
- Bandra Terminus–Hazrat Nizamuddin Garib Rath Express
- Bandra Terminus–Hazrat Nizamuddin Yuva Express
- Bandra Terminus-Lal Kuan Weekly Superfast Express
- Bandra Terminus–Jaipur Superfast Express
- Bandra Terminus–Jammu Tawi Vivek Express
- Bandra Terminus–Lucknow Weekly Express
- Bandra Terminus–Surat Intercity Express
- Bandra Terminus–Udaipur Express
- Bandra Terminus–Vapi Passenger
- Bangalore Cantonment–Kamakhya Humsafar Express
- Bangalore Rajdhani Express
- Bangalore City–Ajmer Garib Nawaz Express
- Bangalore City–Hubli Jan Shatabdi Express
- Barauni–Gwalior Mail
- Bareilly–Delhi Express
- Bareilly–New Delhi Intercity Express
- Barmer–Guwahati Express
- Barmer–Munabao Passenger
- Bathinda–Jammu Tawi Express (via Firozpur)
- Bathinda–Jammu Tawi Express (via Rajpura)
- Belampalli–Hyderabad Express
- Bhagalpur–Anand Vihar Terminal Garib Rath Express
- Bhagalpur–Ajmer Humsafar Express
- Bhagalpur–Lokmanya Tilak Terminus Superfast Express
- Bhagalpur–New Delhi Weekly Superfast Express
- Bhagat Ki Kothi–Bilaspur Express
- Bhagat Ki Kothi–Kamakhya Express
- Bhagat Ki Kothi–Mannargudi Weekly Express
- Bhagat Ki Kothi–Pune Express
- Bhavnagar Terminus-Ayodhya Cantt Weekly Express
- Bhiwani–Kalka Ekta Express
- Bhopal–Bilaspur Express
- Bhopal–Bina Passenger
- Bhopal–Gwalior Intercity Express
- Bhopal–Indore AC Double Decker Express
- Bhopal–Indore Fast Passenger
- Bhopal–Indore Intercity Express
- Bhopal–Jaipur Express
- Bhopal–Jodhpur Passenger
- Bhopal–Lucknow Express
- Bhopal–Pratapgarh Express (via Lucknow)
- Bhopal–Ujjain Passenger
- Bhopal Bharat Teerth Express
- Bhopal Janata Express
- Bhubaneswar–Howrah Jan Shatabdi Express
- Bhubaneswar–Junagarh Express
- Bhubaneswar–Krishnarajapuram Humsafar Express
- Bhubaneswar–New Delhi Duronto Express
- Bhubaneshwar–Visakhapatnam Intercity Express
- Bhuj–Pune Express
- Bikaner–Coimbatore Superfast AC Express
- Bikaner–Bandra Ranakpur Express
- Bikaner–Dadar Superfast Express
- Bikaner–Delhi Sarai Rohilla Intercity Express
- Bikaner–Guwahati Express
- Bikaner–Puri Express
- Bilaspur Rajdhani Express
- Bilaspur–Bikaner Express
- Bilaspur–Patna Weekly SF Express
- Bina–Katni 505 Passenger
- Boudh-Bhubaneswar Express

=== Notable Names ===
- Bagh Express
- Basava Express
- Begampura Express
- Betwa Express
- Bhagirathi Express
- Bhagmati Express
- Bhagyanagar Express
- Bhubaneswar Rajdhani Express
- Bhusaval–Hazrat Nizamuddin Gondwana Express
- Bihar Sampark Kranti Superfast Express
- Black Diamond Express
- Boat Mail
- Brahmaputra Mail
- Brindavan Express
- Budhpurnima Express
- Bundelkhand Express
- Bharat Gaurav Express
- Baidyanathdham Express
- Bandhan Express

== C ==
- Chalisgaon–Dhule Passenger
- Chandigarh–Amritsar Intercity Express
- Chandigarh–Bandra Terminus Superfast Express
- Chandigarh–New Delhi Shatabdi Express
- Chennai–Ahmedabad Humsafar Express
- Chamarajanagar–Tirupati Express
- Chennai Central–Asansol Ratna Express
- Chennai–Bangalore Double Decker Express
- Chennai Central–Bengaluru City Express
- Chennai Central–Bengaluru City Shatabdi Express
- Chennai Central–Bhubaneswar Intercity Express
- Chennai–Coimbatore Intercity Express
- Chennai Central–Coimbatore Shatabdi Express
- Chennai Central–Hazrat Nizamuddin Garib Rath Express
- Chennai Central–Ahmedabad Express
- Chennai Central–Ahmedabad Humsafar Express
- Chennai Rajdhani Express
- Chennai–Hyderabad Superfast Express
- Chennai Central-Bhagat Ki Kothi Superfast Express
- Chennai Central–Jaipur Superfast Express
- Chennai Central–Mysuru Shatabdi Express
- Chennai–New Jalpaiguri SF Express
- Chennai Central–Thiruvananthapuram Central Mail
- Chennai–Salem Express
- Chennai Central–Vijayawada Jan Shatabdi Express
- Chennai–Hazrat Nizamuddin Duronto Express
- Chennai–Madurai AC Duronto Express
- Tambaram–Mangaluru Central Express
- Chennai–Alleppey Express
- Chennai–Thiruvananthapuram Superfast Express
- Chennai-Sainagar Shirdi Express
- Chennai Central–Tirupati Express
- Chhapra–Amritsar Weekly Express
- Bangalore City–Coimbatore Uday Express
- Coimbatore–Chennai Central Superfast Express
- Coimbatore–Jaipur Superfast Express
- Coimbatore–Nagercoil Express
- Coimbatore–Rameswaram Express
- Coimbatore–Tuticorin Link Express
- CSMT Kolhapur–Ahmedabad Express
- CSMT Kolhapur–Hazrat Nizamuddin Superfast Express

=== Notable Names ===
- Chambal Express
- Chamundi Express
- Charminar Express
- Chhattisgarh Sampark Kranti Superfast Express
- Chauri Chaura Express
- Chemmozhi Express
- Chendur Express
- Cheran Superfast Express
- Chetak Express
- Chhapra Express
- Chhattisgarh Express
- Chitrakoot Express
- Cholan Express
- Circar Express
- Coalfield Express
- Cocanada AC Express
- Coromandel Express

== D ==
- Dadar–Ajmer Superfast Express
- Dadar–Bhuj Superfast Express
- Dadar–Chennai Egmore Express
- Dadar–Madgaon Jan Shatabdi Express
- Dadar Sawantwadi Road Rajya Rani Express
- Damoh–Kota Passenger
- Daurai-Godda Express
- Daurai-Tanakpur Express
- Dehradun–Amritsar Express
- Dehradun–Gorakhpur Express
- Dehradun Jan Shatabdi Express
- Dehradun–Muzaffarpur Express
- Dehradun Shatabdi Express
- Delhi–Bareilly Express
- Delhi Sarai Rohilla–Bandra Terminus Garib Rath Express
- Delhi Sarai Rohilla–Bikaner Superfast Express
- Delhi Sarai Rohilla–Jammu Tawi Duronto Express
- Delhi Sarai Rohilla–Udhampur AC Superfast Express
- Devlali–Bhusaval Passenger
- Dhanbad–Bhubaneswar Garib Rath Express
- Dibrugarh–Kanyakumari Vivek Express
- Dibrugarh–Kolkata Superfast Express
- Dibrugarh–Chandigarh Express
- Dibrugarh Rajdhani Express
- Dibrugarh–Tambaram Express
- Dr. Ambedkar Nagar (Mhow)–Yesvantpur Weekly Express
- Durg–Nautanwa Express (via Varanasi)
- Durg–Ajmer Express
- Durg–Hazrat Nizamuddin Humsafar Express
- Dadar Central–Jalna Jan Shatabdi Express
- Dr. Ambedkar Nagar-New Delhi Superfast Express

=== Notable Names ===
- Duronto Express
- Dakshin Express
- Darjeeling Mail
- Darshan Express
- Dayodaya Express
- Deccan Express
- Deccan Queen
- Deekshabhoomi Express
- Devagiri Express
- Dhauli Express
- Doon Express
- Durgavati Express
- Dwarka Express
- Deccan Odyssey
- Double Decker Express

== E ==
- Ernakulam–H.Nizamuddin Duronto Express
- Ernakulam–Okha Express
- Ernakulam–Patna Superfast Express (via Asansol)
- Ernakulam–SMVT Bengaluru Superfast Express
- Ernakulam–Velankanni Express

=== Notable Names ===
- East Coast Express (India)
- Ernad Express

== F ==
- Faizabad Delhi Express
- Faizabad Superfast Express
- Firozpur Janata Express
- Firozpur–Rameswaram Humsafar Express

=== Notable Names ===
- Fairy Queen Express
- Falaknuma Express
- Farakka Express (via Sultanpur)
- Flying Ranee

== G ==
- Gandhidham-Nagercoil Express
- Gandhidham–Kamakhya Express
- Gandhidham–Puri Weekly Express
- Kishanganj–Ajmer Garib Nawaz Express
- Gaya–Anand Vihar Garib Rath Express
- Gorakhpur–Anand Vihar Express
- Gorakhpur–Anand Vihar Terminal Humsafar Express (via Basti)
- Gorakhpur–Anand Vihar Terminal Humsafar Express (via Barhni)
- Gorakhpur–Okha Express
- Gorakhpur–Lokmanya Tilak Terminus Superfast Express
- Gorakhpur–Pune Express
- Gorakhpur–Pune Weekly Express
- Gorakhpur-Secunderabad Express
- Gorakhpur–Yesvantpur Express
- Guwahati–Chennai Egmore Express
- Guwahati–Secunderabad Express
- Guwahati–Anand Vihar Terminal North East Express
- Guwahati–Jorhat Town Jan Shatabdi Express
- Guwahati–Thiruvananthapuram Express
- Guwahati–Dibrugarh Shatabdi Express
- Gwalior–Chhindwara Express
- Guwahati-Sairang Express
- Gwalior - SMVT Bengaluru Express
- Godda-Delhi Weekly Express
- Gonda-Asansol Express

=== Notable Names ===
- Ganadevata Express
- Ganga Damodar Express
- Ganga Gomti Express
- Ganga Kaveri Express
- Ganga Sagar Express
- Ganga Sutlej Express
- Garbha Express
- Garhwal Express
- Garib Rath Express
- Gatimaan Express
- Gitanjali Express
- Goa Express
- Goa Sampark Kranti Express
- Godaan Express
- Gol Gumbaz Express
- Golconda Express
- Golden Chariot
- Golden Temple Mail
- Gomti Express
- Gondwana Express
- Gorakhdham Express
- Gour Express
- Gowthami Express
- Grand Trunk Express
- Gujarat Superfast Express
- Gujarat Mail
- Gujarat Queen
- Gujarat Sampark Kranti Express
- Gurumukhi Superfast Express
- Guruvayur Express

== H ==
- Habibganj–Indore InterCity Express
- Habibganj–Dahod Fast Passenger
- Habibganj–Jabalpur Jan Shatabdi Express
- Hadapsar-Rewa Weekly Express
- Hapa Tirunelveli Superfast Express
- Haridwar–Una Link Janshatabdi Express
- Haridwar-Firozpur Cantt Weekly Express
- Hatia–Pune Superfast Express
- Hazrat Nizamuddin–Kolhapur Express
- Hazrat Nizamuddin–Jabalpur Express
- Hazrat Nizamuddin–Pune Duronto Express
- Hazrat Nizamuddin–Thiruvananthapuram Rajdhani Express
- Hazur Sahib Nanded-Firozpur Cantt Weekly Express
- Hisar–Coimbatore AC Superfast Express
- Howrah–Ahmedabad Superfast Express
- Howrah–Azimganj Kavi Guru Express
- Howrah–Barbil Jan Shatabdi Express
- Howrah–Bhopal Weekly Express
- Howrah–Delhi Janata Express
- Howrah–Digha Super AC Express
- Howrah–Ernakulam Antyodaya Express
- Howrah–Hatia Express
- Howrah–Jamalpur Kavi Guru Express
- Howrah–Jodhpur Express
- Howrah–Lalkuan Express
- Howrah–Malda Town Intercity Express
- Howrah–Mumbai CST Duronto Express
- Howrah–Mumbai CSMT Mail (via Nagpur)
- Howrah–Mumbai CSMT Mail (via Gaya)
- Howrah–Mumbai Superfast Express
- Howrah–New Delhi Express
- Howrah–New Delhi Duronto Express
- Howrah–New Delhi Yuva Express
- Howrah–New Jalpaiguri AC Express
- Howrah–Porbandar Express
- Howrah–Puri Express
- Howrah–Purulia Express
- Howrah–Kanyakumari Express
- Howrah Rajdhani Express
- Howrah–Ranchi Shatabdi Express
- Howrah–SMVT Bengaluru Humsafar Express
- Howrah–Yeshvantapur Duronto Express
- Howrah–Yesvantpur Humsafar Express
- Howrah–Yesvantpur Superfast Express
- Hubballi-Kushtagi Express
- Hubballi–Varanasi Weekly Express
- Hyderabad–Jaipur Meenakshi Express
- Hyderabad–Vasco da Gama Express
- Hyderabad–Mumbai Express
- Hyderabad–Pune Express
- Hyderabad–Visakhapatnam Godavari Express

=== Notable Names ===
- Humsafar Express
- Haldighati Passenger
- Hampi Express
- Haripriya Express
- Hazarduari Express
- Hemkunt Express
- Himachal Express
- Himalayan Queen
- Himalayan Queen Express
- Himgiri Superfast Express
- Himsa Express
- Himsagar Express
- Hirakhand Express
- Hirakud Express
- Hool Express
- Hussainsagar Express
- Hutatma Express

== I ==
- Indore–Amritsar Express
- Indore–Bareilly Weekly Express
- Indore–Bhind Express
- Indore–Bhopal Intercity Express
- Indore–Chandigarh Weekly Express
- Indore-Daund Superfast Express
- Indore–Dehradun Express
- Indore–Dr. Ambedkar Nagar DEMU
- Indore–Guwahati Weekly Express
- Indore–Gwalior Intercity Express
- Indore–Jabalpur Overnight Express
- Indore–Jaipur Superfast Express
- Indore–Jaipur Express via Ajmer
- Indore–Jammu Tawi Weekly Superfast Express
- Indore–Kota Intercity Express
- Indore–Maksi Passenger
- Indore–Nagda Passenger
- Indore–Nagpur Express
- Indore–Nagpur Tri Shatabdi Express
- Indore–New Delhi Intercity Express
- Indore–Patna Express
- Indore–Pune Express (via Panvel)
- Indore–Pune Superfast Express
- Indore–Puri Humsafar Express
- Indore–Rajendra Nagar via Faizabad Express
- Indore–Rajendranagar Express (via Sultanpur)
- Indore–Ratlam DEMU

=== Notable Names ===
- Intercity Express
- Indrayani Express
- Island Express
- Ispat Express

== J ==
- Jabalpur–Ambikapur Express
- Jalna Ke Aala Hazrat Express
- Jabalpur–Indore Intercity Express
- Jabalpur–Yeshwantpur Express
- Jabalpur–Somnath Express
- Jabalpur–Amravati Express
- Jabalpur–Habibganj Intercity Express
- Jabalpur–Indore Express
- Jabalpur–Jammu Tawi Express
- Mumbai–Jaipur Duronto Express
- Jaipur–Nagpur Weekly Express
- Jaipur Kamakhya Kavi Guru Express
- Jabalpur–Mumbai Garibrath Express
- Jabalpur–New Delhi Express
- Jabalpur–Rewa Intercity Express
- Jabalpur–Shri Mata Vaishno Devi Katra Express
- Jaipur–Agra Fort Shatabdi Express
- Jaipur–Bandra Terminus Superfast Express
- Jaipur–Delhi Sarai Rohilla AC Double Decker Express
- Jaipur–Kamakhya Kavi Guru Express
- Jaipur–Mysore Superfast Express
- Jaipur Superfast Express
- Jammu Tawi–Kathgodam Garib Rath Express
- Jammu Tawi Rajdhani Express
- Jaipur–Jodhpur Intercity Express
- Jalandhar City–New Delhi Intercity Express
- Jalna Jan Shatabdi Express
- Jammu Tawi–Indore Express
- Jaynagar–Anand Vihar Garib Rath Express
- Jhansi–Lucknow Intercity Express
- Jodhpur-Hadapsar Express

=== Notable Names ===
- Jan Sadharan Express
- Jan Shatabdi Express
- Jammu Mail
- Janmabhoomi Express
- Jharkhand Sampark Kranti Express
- Jharkhand Swarna Jayanti Express
- Jhelum Express
- Jnaneswari Express
- Jallianwalla Bagh Express
- Jaynagar Howrah Express

== K ==
- Kacheguda–Ashokapuram Express
- Kacheguda-Bhagat Ki Kothi Express
- Kacheguda–Chengalpattu Express
- Kacheguda–Repalle Express
- Kalka–New Delhi Shatabdi Express
- Kalka Shatabdi Express
- Kamakhya–Anand Vihar Weekly Express
- Kamakhya–Gaya Weekly Express
- Kamakhya–Howrah Vande Bharat Sleeper Express
- Kamakhya–Ledo Intercity Express
- Kamakhya–Mumbai LTT AC Express
- Kamakhya–Murkongselek Lachit Express
- Kannur–Thiruvananthapuram Jan Shatabdi Express
- Kanpur–Allahabad Intercity Express
- Kanpur–New Delhi Shatabdi Express
- Kanpur–Varanasi Varuna Express
- Kanpur Central–Kathgodam Garib Rath Express
- Chennai Egmore–Kanniyakumari Express
- Kanyakumari–Mumbai Express
- Karikal–Bangalore City Passenger
- Kochuveli–Dehradun Superfast Express
- Kochuveli-Indore Express
- Kochuveli–Lokmanya Tilak Terminus Garib Rath Express
- Kochuveli–Yesvantpur AC Express
- Kochuveli–Yesvantpur Garib Rath Express
- Kolkata–Azamgarh Weekly Express
- Kolkata–Guwahati Garib Rath Express
- Kolkata–Jammu Tawi Express
- Kolkata–Agra Cantonment Express
- Kolkata–Agra Cantonment Superfast Express
- Kolkata–Anand Vihar Express
- Kolkata–Haldibari Intercity Express
- Kolkata-Sairang Express
- Kolkata–Patna Garib Rath Express
- Kolkata Rajdhani Express
- Kolkata Shalimar–Patna Duronto Express
- Kollam–Visakhapatnam Express
- Koraput–Rourkela Express
- Korba–Visakhapatnam Express
- Kota–Hazrat Nizamuddin Jan Shatabdi Express
- KSR Bangalore–Bhagat Ki Kothi Express (via Ballari)
- KSR Bengaluru–Hazur Sahib Nanded Express
- KSR Bengaluru–Jolarpettai Express

=== Notable Names ===
- Kaghaznagar Express
- Kaifiyat Express
- Kalindi Express
- Kalinga Utkal Express
- Kalka Mail
- Kamayani Express
- Kamrup Express
- Kanchan Kanya Express
- Kanchenjunga Express
- Kasi Tamil Sangam Express
- Karnataka Express
- Karnataka Sampark Kranti Express
- Karnavati Express
- Kashi Express
- Kashi Vishwanath Express
- Kathgodam Express
- Katol Passenger
- Kaveri Express
- Kaziranga Superfast Express
- Kerala Express
- Kerala Sampark Kranti Express
- Kolkata Mail
- Konark Express
- Kongu Express
- Konkan Kanya Express
- Kovai Express
- Koyna Express
- Krishak Express
- Krishna Express
- Kumbha Express
- Kushinagar Express
- Kutch Express
- Krishak Express
- Kulik Intercity Express
- Kollam Mail Express

== L ==
- Latur–Mumbai Express
- Lokmanya Tilak Terminus–Coimbatore Express
- Lokmanya Tilak Terminus–Hazur Sahib Nanded Express
- Lokmanya Tilak Terminus–Kamakhya AC Express
- Lokmanya Tilak Terminus–Karaikal Weekly Express
- Lokmanya Tilak Terminus–Madurai Express
- Lokmanya Tilak Terminus–Puri Superfast Express
- Lokmanya Tilak Terminus–Prayagraj Duronto Express
- Lokmanya Tilak Terminus–Ernakulam Duronto Express
- Lokmanya Tilak Terminus–Haridwar AC Superfast Express
- Lokmanya Tilak Terminus–Hazrat Nizamuddin AC Express
- Lokmanya Tilak Terminus–Karimnagar Express
- Lokmanya Tilak Terminus–Madgaon AC Double Decker Express
- Lokmanya Tilak Terminus–Manmad Godavari Express
- Lokmanya Tilak Terminus–Gorakhpur Express
- Lokmanya Tilak Terminus-Gaya Weekly Superfast Express
- Lucknow Junction–Anand Vihar Terminal Double Decker Express
- Lokmanya Tilak Terminus–Kochuveli Express
- Lucknow Junction–Kathgodam Express
- Lucknow–Chandigarh Express
- Lucknow–Bhopal Garib Rath Express
- Lucknow–Raipur Garib Rath Express
- Lucknow Swarna Shatabdi Express
- Lucknow–Vindhyachal Intercity Express
- Lucknow–New Delhi AC Superfast Express

=== Notable Names ===
- Lal Bagh Express
- Lashkar Express
- Lichchavi Express
- Lohit Express
- Lok Shakti Express
- Lucknow Mail

== M ==
- Madgaon Rajdhani Express
- Madurai–Chennai Egmore Express
- Madurai–Dehradun Express
- Mangaluru–Chennai Mail
- Mangalore–Yaswanthpur Express
- Mau–Anand Vihar Terminal Express
- Mayiladuthurai–Coimbatore Jan Shatabdi Express
- MGR Chennai Central–Shivamogga Town Superfast Express
- Mhow–Indore Passenger
- Mumbai Central–Ahmedabad Double Decker Express
- Mumbai Central–Ahmedabad Shatabdi Express
- Mumbai–Chennai Mail
- Mumbai CST–Amritsar Express
- Mumbai CST–Chhapra Express
- Mumbai CST–Pandharpur Fast Passenger
- Mumbai CST–Chennai Express
- Mumbai CSMT-Mangaluru Junction Superfast Express
- Mumbai–Nagercoil Express
- Mumbai–Jhansi Express
- Mumbai LTT – Chhapra Express
- Mumbai–New Delhi Duronto Express
- Mumbai Rajdhani Express
- Mumbai CSMT–Hazrat Nizamuddin Rajdhani Express
- Mysuru–Ajmer Express
- Mysuru–Cuddalore Port Express
- Mysuru–Dharwad Express
- Mysuru Junction–Talaguppa Intercity Express
- Mysuru–Tuticorin Express

=== Notable Names ===
- Madhya Pradesh Sampark Kranti Express
- Magadh Express
- Mahabodhi Express
- Mahakoshal Express
- Mahalaxmi Express
- Mahamana Express
- Mahanadi Express
- Mahanagari Express
- Mahananda Express
- Mahaparinirvan Express
- Maharashtra Express
- Maharashtra Sampark Kranti Express
- Maithili Express
- Maitree Express
- Malabar Express
- Malwa Express
- Manas Rhino Passenger
- Mandore Express
- Mandovi Express
- Mangala Lakshadweep Express
- Mangalore Mail
- Mannai Express
- Manwar Sangam Express
- Marathwada Express
- Marudhar Express
- Marusagar Express
- Matsyagandha Express
- Maur Dhawaj Express
- Maveli Express
- Mewar Express
- Millennium Express
- Mithila Express
- Muri Express
- Mussoorie Express
- Maharajas' Express
- Mitali Express

== N ==
- Nagda–Bina Passenger
- Nagercoil Passenger
- Nagpur–Bhusawal Superfast Express
- Nagpur Duronto Express
- Nagpur–Jabalpur Express
- Nagpur–Amritsar AC Superfast Express
- Naharlagun–Guwahati Donyi Polo Express
- Naharlagun–Guwahati Shatabdi Express
- Naharlagun–Dekargaon Passenger
- Nanded–Hyderabad Passenger
- Nangal Dam–Amb Andaura Passenger
- Nangal Dam–Ambala Passenger
- Narasapur–Hyderabad Express
- Narasapur–Nagarsol Express (via Guntur)
- New Delhi–Amritsar Shatabdi Express
- New Delhi–Daurai Shatabdi Express
- New Delhi–Firozpur Shatabdi Express
- New Delhi–Habibganj Shatabdi Express
- New Delhi–Kathgodam Shatabdi Express
- New Delhi–Ludhiana Shatabdi Express
- New Delhi–Moga Shatabdi Express
- New Delhi–Naharlagun AC Superfast Express
- New Delhi–Amritsar Shatabdi Express
- New Jalpaiguri–Howrah Shatabdi Express
- New Jalpaiguri–New Delhi Superfast Express
- New Tinsukia–Bengaluru Weekly Express
- Nizamabad–Kacheguda DEMU
- Nizamabad–Pune Passenger
- Nanded–Visakhapatnam Express

=== Notable Names ===
- Nagaland Express
- Nagarjuna Express
- Nagavali Express
- Nanda Devi AC Express
- Nandigram Express
- Narayanadri Express
- Narmada Express
- Nauchandi Express
- Navjeevan Express
- Navyug Express
- Neelachal Express
- Nellai Superfast Express
- Netravati Express
- Nilgiri Express
- North East Express
- Netaji Express

== O ==
- Odisha Sampark Kranti Express
- Okha–Tuticorin Vivek Express
- Okha-Bhavnagar Express

== P ==
- Pachora–Jamner Passenger
- Patliputra–Chandigarh Superfast Express
- Patna–Howrah Jan Shatabdi Express
- Patna–Kota Express
- Patna–Mumbai CST Suvidha Superfast Express
- Patna–Kota Express
- Patna–Ranchi Jan Shatabdi Express
- Patna–Anand Vihar Terminal Express
- Porbandar–Santragachi Kavi Guru Express
- Pune–Ahmedabad Duronto Express
- Pune–Kamakhya Suvidha Special Express
- Pune–Ajni AC Superfast Express
- Pune–Bhusaval Express
- Pune–Nagpur Express
- Pune–Nagpur Garib Rath Express
- Pune–Darbhanga Gyan Ganga Express
- Pune–Ernakulam Express
- Pune–Howrah Duronto Express
- Pune–Manduadih Gyan Ganga Express
- Pune–Secunderabad Shatabdi Express
- Pune–Kazipet Weekly Superfast Express
- Puri–Kamakhya Weekly Express
- Puri–Ahmedabad Express
- Puri–Digha Express
- Puri–Howrah Express
- Puri–Howrah Garib Rath Express
- Puri–Howrah Shatabdi Express
- Puri–Lokmanya Tilak Terminus Express
- Puri–Okha Dwarka Express
- Puri–Yesvantpur Garib Rath Express

=== Notable Names ===
- Padatik Express
- Padmavat Express
- Padmavati Express
- Paharia Express
- Palani Express
- Palaruvi Express
- Pallavan Superfast Express
- Palnadu Express
- Pamani Express
- Panchvalley Express
- Panchvati Express
- Pandian Superfast Express
- Parasnath Express
- Parasuram Express
- Paschim Express
- Patalkot Express
- Patliputra Express
- Pawan Express
- Pearl City Express
- Pinakini Express
- Pooja Superfast Express
- Poorbiya Express
- Poorna Express
- Poorva Express (via Patna)
- Poorva Express (via Gaya)
- Poorvottar Sampark Kranti Express
- Pothigai Superfast Express
- Pragati Express
- Prashanti Express
- Prashanti Nilayam Express
- Pratap Express
- Pratham Swatrantata Sangram Express
- Prayagraj Express
- Prerana Express
- Punjab Mail
- Purushottam Express
- Purvanchal Express
- Pushpak Express
- Palace on Wheels

== Q ==
- Quilon Mail

== R ==
- Kolkata–Radhikapur Express
- Raigarh–Gondia Jan Shatabdi Express
- Raigarh–Hazrat Nizamuddin Gondwana Express
- Rajendra Nagar–Lokmanya Tilak Terminus Janta Express
- Rajendra Nagar Patna–Indore Express
- Rajendra Nagar Patna Rajdhani Express
- Rajgir–Bakhtiyarpur DEMU
- Rajgir–Danapur MEMU
- Rajkot–Secunderabad Express
- Rajkot–Coimbatore Express
- Rajgir–Mumbai LTT Janta Express
- Rameswaram–Tirupathi Meenakshi Express
- Ranchi–Ajmer Garib Nawaz Express
- Ranchi–Kamakhya Express
- Ranchi-Gorakhpur Weekly Express
- Ranchi–New Delhi Garib Rath Express
- Ranchi Rajdhani Express
- Radhikapur-Anand Vihar Terminal Weekly Express
- Rewa–Dr. Ambedkar Nagar Express
- Rohtak–Rewari DEMU
- Rani Kamalapati–New Delhi Shatabdi Express

=== Notable Names ===
- Rajdhani Express
- Rajya Rani Express
- Rajasthan Sampark Kranti Express
- Rajgriha Express
- Ramayana Express
- Ranakpur Express
- Rani Chennamma Express
- Ranikhet Express
- Ranthambore Express
- Raptisagar Express
- Ratnachal Express
- Rayalaseema Express
- Rewanchal Express
- Rockfort Superfast Express
- Royal Orient
- Royal Rajasthan on Wheels
- Rupashi Bangla Express
- Rameswaram Express

== S ==
- Saharsa–Amritsar Garib Rath Express
- Sainagar Shirdi–Chhatrapati Shivaji Terminus Fast Passenger
- Sainagar Shirdi–Dadar SuperFast Express
- Sainagar Shirdi–Howrah Express
- Sainagar Shirdi-Secunderabad Express
- Sainagar Shirdi-Visakhapatnam Express
- Sainagar Shirdi–Machilipatnam Express
- Sairang–Anand Vihar Terminal Rajdhani Express
- Salem–Karur Passenger
- Sambalpur-Boudh Express
- Santragachi–Chennai Central AC Express
- Santragachi–Mangaluru Central Vivek Express
- Sealdah Ballia Express
- Sealdah–Bikaner Duronto Express
- Sealdah–New Delhi Duronto Express
- Sealdah Rajdhani Express
- Sealdah–Puri Duronto Express
- Secunderabad–Danapur Express
- Secunderabad–Manuguru Express
- Secunderabad–Mumbai Duronto Express
- Secunderabad–Nanded Express
- Secunderabad–Hazrat Nizamuddin Duronto Express
- Secunderabad–Porbandar Weekly Express
- Secunderabad Rajdhani Express
- Secunderabad–Shalimar Express
- Secunderabad–Visakhapatnam AC Express
- Secunderabad–Yesvantpur Garib Rath Express
- Secunderabad-Vasco da Gama Express
- Shalimar–Bhuj Weekly Superfast Express
- Shalimar (Howrah) Express
- Shalimar–Lokmanya Tilak Terminus Express
- Shalimar–Puri Express
- Silchar–Bhairabi Passenger
- Silchar–Jiribam Passenger
- Solapur-Hassan Express
- Solapur–Mumbai CST Express
- Sogaria (Kota)–Danapur Express
- Sri Ganganagar–Tiruchirappalli Humsafar Express
- Sukrimangela–Jabalpur Passenger
- Surat–Bhagalpur Express
- Surat–Jamnagar Intercity Express
- Surat–Malda Town Express
- Surat–Muzaffarpur Express
- Secunderabad–Manuguru Express
- SMVT Bengaluru–Murdeshwar Express
- SMVT Bangalore–Tirupati Intercity Express

=== Notable Names ===
- Sampark Kranti Express
- Sabari Express
- Ahmedabad–Darbhanga Sabarmati Express
- Ahmedabad-Varanasi City Sabarmati Express
- Sachkhand Express
- Sadbhawna Express (via Sagauli)
- Sahid Express
- Sahyadri Express
- Saket Express
- Samarsata Express
- Samata Express
- Samjhauta Express
- Sampoorna Kranti Express
- Samleshwari Express
- Sangam Express
- Sanghamithra Express
- Sapt Kranti Express
- Saraighat Express
- Sarguja Express
- Sarnath Express
- Satavahana Express
- Satpura Express
- Satyagrah Express
- Saurashtra Express
- Saurashtra Mail
- Sayajinagari Express
- Saryu Yamuna Express
- Ahmedabad–Shri Mata Vaishno Devi Katra Sarvodaya Express
- Seshadri Express
- Sethu Express
- Seven Hills Express
- Sewagram Express
- Shaan-e-Bhopal Express
- Shaheed Express
- Shaktipunj Express
- Shakuntala Express
- Shalimar Express
- Shan–e–Punjab Express
- Shanti Express
- Shantiniketan Express
- Sharavati Express
- Shatabdi Express
- Shipra Express
- Shiv Ganga Express
- Shram Shakti Express
- Shramik Express
- Shramjeevi Superfast Express
- Shri Ramayana Express
- Shri Shakti AC Express
- Siddhaganga Intercity Express
- Siddheshwar Express
- Silambu Express
- Simhadri Express
- Simhapuri Express
- Sinhagad Express
- Somnath Superfast Express
- Sri Jagannath Express
- Steel Express
- Suryanagri Express
- Sushasan Express
- Swaraj Express
- Swarna Jayanti Express
- Swarna Jayanti Rajdhani Express
- Swarnarekha express
- Swatantra Senani Superfast Express
- Sapthagiri Express
- Suvidha Express
- Samudra Kanya Express
- Seemanchal Express
- Sahibganj Intercity
- Samjhauta Express

== T ==
- Tambaram-Rameswaram Express
- Tatanagar–Ernakulam Express
- Thiruvananthapuram North–Amritsar Weekly Express
- Thiruvananthapuram–Veraval Express
- Thiruvananthapuram–Indore Express
- Thiruvananthapuram North−Porbandar Superfast Express
- Thiruvananthapuram Rajdhani Express
- Thiruvananthapuram–Hazrat Nizamuddin Express (Via Alappuzha)
- Tinsukia-Naharlagun Express
- Tiruchirappalli–Howrah Superfast Express
- Tiruchirappalli–Thiruvananthapuram Intercity Express
- Tiruchirappalli–Mayiladuthurai Express
- Tirupati-Chikkamangaluru Express
- Tirupati–Vasco da Gama Express
- Tirupati–Amravati Express
- Tirupati–Sainagar Shirdi Express
- Tirupati–Jammu Tawi Humsafar Express

=== Notable Names ===
- Tejas Express
- Taj Express
- Tamil Nadu Express
- Tamil Nadu Sampark Kranti Express
- Tapaswini Express
- Tapovan Express
- Tapti Ganga Express
- Tea Garden Express
- Tebhaga Express
- Teesta Torsha Express
- Telangana Express
- Thar Express
- Thiruchendur Express
- Thirukural Express
- Thiruvananthapuram Mail
- Tirhut Express
- Tirumala Express
- Tripura Sundari Express
- Triveni Express
- Tulsi Express
- Tippu Express
- Tutari Express

== U ==
- Udaipur City–Jaipur Intercity Express
- Udaipur City–Chandigarh Superfast Express
- Udaipur City–Delhi Sarai Rohilla Rajasthan Humsafar Express
- Udaipur City–Mysuru Palace Queen Humsafar Express
- Udhna–Banaras Express
- Ujjain–Bhopal Passenger
- Ujjain–Nagda Passenger
- Ujjain–Indore Passenger
- Una Jan Shatabdi Express

=== Notable Names ===
- Uday Express
- Udyan Express
- Udyog Karmi Express
- Udyognagri Express
- Ujjaini Express
- Unchahar Express
- Upasana Express
- Utsarg Express
- Uttar Banga Express
- Uttar Pradesh Sampark Kranti Express
- Uttar Sampark Kranti Express
- Uttarakhand Sampark Kranti Express
- Uttaranchal Express
- Uzhavan Express

== V ==
- Mumbai Central–Vadodara Express
- Vadodara–Kota Express
- Valsad–Haridwar Superfast Express
- Valsad–Puri Superfast Express
- Varanasi–Anand Vihar Terminal Garib Rath Express
- Varanasi–Dehradun Express
- Varanasi–Lucknow Intercity Express (via Pratapgarh)
- Varanasi–Lucknow Intercity Express
- Varanasi–Lucknow Charbagh Varuna Express
- Vasco Chennai Express
- Vasco da Gama–Velankanni Weekly Express
- Vijayapura-Mangaluru Central Express
- Vijayawada–Rayagada Passenger
- Visakhapatnam–Bhagat Ki Kothi Express
- Visakhapatnam–Koraput Intercity Express
- Visakhapatnam–Lokmanya Tilak Terminus Express
- Visakhapatnam Swarna Jayanti Express
- Visakhapatnam–Gandhidham Express
- Visakhapatnam–Kirandul Passenger
- Visakhapatnam–Secunderabad Duronto Express
- Visakhapatnam–Secunderabad Garib Rath Express
- Visakhapatnam–Tirupati Double Decker Express

=== Notable Names ===
- Vande Bharat Express
- Vande Bharat Sleeper Express
- Vaigai Superfast Express
- Vaishali Express
- Vanchinad Express
- Venad Express
- Venkatadri Express
- Vibhuti Express
- Vidarbha Express
- Vikramshila Express
- Vindhyachal Express
- Visakha Express
- Viswabharati Fast Passenger
- Vivek Express
- Vananchal Express
- Vishwamanava Express
- Veer Bhumi Chittaurgarh Express
- Village on Wheels

== W ==
- Wainganga Superfast Express
- West Bengal Sampark Kranti Express
- West Coast Express (India)
- Wodeyar Express

== Y ==
- Yesvantpur–Ahmedabad Weekly Express
- Yesvantpur–Barmer AC Express
- Yesvantpur–Chandigarh Karnataka Sampark Kranti Express
- Yeshvantapur–Delhi Sarai Rohilla AC Duronto Express
- Yesvantpur–Harihar Intercity Express
- Yesvantpur–Hassan Intercity Express
- Yesvantpur–Howrah Superfast Express
- Yesvantpur–Jabalpur Superfast Express
- Yesvantpur–Kamakhya AC Superfast Express
- Yesvantpur–Latur Express
- Yesvantpur–Puducherry Weekly Express

=== Notable Names ===
- Yelagiri Express
- Yercaud Express
- Yoga Express
- Yuva Express

== Z ==
- Ziyarat Express

== Defunct trains ==
- Agartala–Lumding Express
- Ahmedabad–Udaipur Express
- Andhra Pradesh Express (old)
- Assam Mail
- Cachar Express
- East Bengal Express
- East Bengal Mail
- Imperial Indian Mail
- Udyan Abha Toofan Express
- Sealdah-Varanasi Express
- Sealdah-Anand Vihar Terminal Express
- Kolkata-Patna Express
- Sealdah-Sitamarhi Express
- Jhajha–Dibrugarh Weekly Express
- Howrah-Anand Vihar Yuva Express
- Howrah-Amritsar Express
- Lal Quila Express
- Howrah-Delhi Janata Express
- Howrah-Rajgir Fast Passenger
- Howrah-Ranchi Intercity Express (via Asansol)
- Sealdah-Rampurhat Intercity Express
- Barddhaman-Rampurhat Express
- Kolkata-Jasidih Fast Passenger
- Howrah-Dhanbad Double Decker Express
- Howrah-New Jalpaiguri AC Express
- Chalukya Express
- Jaipur - Yesvantpur Garib Rath Express

== See also ==
- List of railway stations in India
