= Masaipet bus–train collision =

2014 incident in Telangana, India

The Medak District bus-train collision took place on the morning of 24 July 2014 at Masaipet in the Medak district of Telangana state in India. A bus carrying at least 40 children collided with the Nanded-Hyderabad Passenger train at an unstaffed level crossing.

Sixteen students, aged between three and 14, the bus driver, and the cleaner were killed in the crash. Twenty other children were taken to hospital in Kompally, near Hyderabad. The bus driver, Bhikshapati Goud, was on his cellphone at the time of the collision, according to some reports.

Telangana Chief Minister K. Chandrasekhar Rao ordered officials to take care of the children and ensure they received the best medical treatment, and offered his condolences. It took some time for emergency services to reach the scene, and locals attempted to rescue the victims on their own.
