= Secunderabad–Nanded Express =

The Secunderabad–Nanded Express is a passenger rail service that operates between the cities of Secunderabad in the Indian state of Andhra Pradesh and Nanded in the Indian state of Maharashtra.

It is operated by the South Central Railway region of the Indian Railways. The service lists under the Nanded division of the South Central Railway and was restarted in early 2006 after the complete conversion of the Nanded division from metre gauge to broad gauge. This is a daily service. In September 2025, a new Vande Bharat train was announced to run on this line.

== Train numbers ==
- Secunderabad to Nanded- 7039
- Nanded to Secunderabad- 7046

== Timings ==
- Secunderabad-Nanded departure—07.25 (07:25 AM) arrival—13.30 (01:30 PM)
- Nanded-Secunderabad departure—14.40 (02:40 PM) arrival—20.20 (08:20 PM)
- The train travels a distance of 284 km.
- The duration of the journey is 6 hours and 10 minutes.

== Locomotive ==
The entire Nanded division of the South Central Railway has non-electrified track. Hence, a single WDM2A locomotive hauls the train both ways, the locomotive usually belongs to the Guntakal, Maula Ali or Pune sheds.

== Stoppages ==
Train no. 7039, Secunderabad JN to Nanded (SC to NED) stops in the following stations:

1. SC—Secunderabad Junction (Source)
2. MJF—Malkajgiri
3. BMO—Bolarum
4. GWV—Gowdavalli
5. MED—Medchal
6. WDR—Wadiaram
7. MZL—Mirzapalli
8. AKE—Akanapet
9. KMC—Kamareddi
10. NZB—Nizamabad
11. BSX—Basar
12. DAB—Dharmabad
13. UMRI—Umri
14. MUE—Mudkhed Junction
15. NED—Nanded (Destination)

Train no. 7040, Nanded to Secunderabad JN (NED to SC) stops in the reverse order of the above list.

== See also ==
- Rail transport in India
- South Central Railway
- Nizamabad - Visakhapatnam Express
