= Kanpur–Varanasi Varuna Express =

Overview
- Service type: Express
- Status: active
- Current operator: Indian Railways

Route
- Distance travelled: 357 km (222 mi)
- Average journey time: 7 hours 20 minutes
- Service frequency: Daily
- Train number: 24227/24228

On-board services
- Classes: Second AC (2A), Third AC (3A), Sleeper Class (SL), General Unreserved (GS)
- Seating arrangements: Yes
- Sleeping arrangements: Yes
- Auto-rack arrangements: No
- Catering facilities: Yes
- Observation facilities: Yes
- Entertainment facilities: No
- Baggage facilities: Yes

Technical
- Rolling stock: Standard Indian Railways coaches
- Track gauge: 1,676 mm (5 ft 6 in)
- Electrification: Yes
- Operating speed: 55 km/h (34 mph), average including halts 110 km/h (68 mph), maximum speed
- Rake maintenance: Yes
- Rake sharing: No

The Kanpur–Varanasi Varuna Express is an Indian Railways Express train which runs between the cities of Kanpur and Varanasi . It was extended in 2011 from Lucknow to Kanpur. The train runs with 17 coaches. It covers the 355 km distance in 7 hours and 20 minutes from Kanpur to Varanasi and 6 hours 40 minutes from Varanasi to Kanpur. The train was extended to Kanpur in Railway Budget 2011–12.

== Time table (important halts) ==
Kanpur Central to Varanasi-24228

Station code	Station name	Arrival	Departure
CNB	Kanpur Central	Starting station	16:00
ON	Unnao	16:24	Stop
LKO	Lucknow	17:50	Stop
SLN	Sultanpur	20:20	Stop
BSB	Varanasi	23:20	Destination

From Varanasi to Kanpur Central-24227

Station code	Station name	Arrival	Departure
BSB	Varanasi	Starting station	04:55
SLN	Sultanpur	07:08	Stop
LKO	Lucknow	10:00	Stop
ON	Unnao	10:55	Stop
CNB	Kanpur Central	11:35	Destination

== See also ==
- Shram Shakti Express
- Kanpur–New Delhi Shatabdi Express
- Chitrakootdham (Karwi)–Kanpur Intercity Express (via Allahabad)
- Kanpur
- Lucknow–Kanpur Suburban Railway
