= Puri–Digha Express =

Puri Digha Express
Overview
- Service type: Express
- First service: 22878 / 77 Puri Digha Express - 22 February 2012 , 22890 / 89 Puri Digha Express – 11 December 2010
- Current operator: East Coast Railways

Route
- Termini: Puri; Digha
- Stops: 11
- Distance travelled: 549 km (341 mi)
- Average journey time: 9 hours 55 mins as 22878 / 90 Puri Digha Express, 10 hours 05 mins as 22877 / 89 Digha Puri Express.
- Service frequency: Weekly. 22878 Puri Digha Express – Wednesday, 22877 Digha Puri Express – Thursday. 22890 Puri Digha Express – Saturday. 22889 Digha Puri Express – Sunday .
- Train number: 22890 / 89 / 78 / 77

On-board services
- Classes: AC 2 tier, AC 3 tier, Sleeper Class, General Unreserved
- Seating arrangements: Yes
- Sleeping arrangements: Yes
- Catering facilities: No
- Observation facilities: 22890 /89 Puri Digha Express previously ran as 12580 / 79 Puri Digha Express .

Technical
- Rolling stock: Standard Indian Railways Coaches
- Track gauge: 1,676 mm (5 ft 6 in)
- Electrification: Partial
- Operating speed: 110 km/h (68 mph) maximum, 54.90 km/h (34 mph), including halts.

The 22890 / 89 / 78 / 77 Puri Digha Express was an Express train belonging to Indian Railways - East Coast Railway zone that ran between Puri and Digha in India.

It was operated as train number 22890 / 78 from Puri to Digha and as train number 22889 / 77 in the reverse direction serving the states of West Bengal and Odisha.

== Coaches ==
The 22890 / 89 Puri Digha Express had 1 AC 2 tier, 1 AC 3 tier, 9 Sleeper Class, 4 General Unreserved and 2 SLR (Seating cum Luggage Rake) Coaches whereas 22878 / 77 Puri Digha Express has 1 AC 2 tier, 1 AC 3 tier, 5 Sleeper Class, 4 General Unreserved and 2 SLR (Seating cum Luggage Rake) Coaches. They did not carry a Pantry car coach. .

As is customary with most train services in India, Coach Composition may be amended at the discretion of Indian Railways depending on demand.

== Service ==
The 22890 / 78 Puri Digha Express was covers the distance of 549 km (341 mi) in 9 hours 55 mins (55.36 km/h), in 10 hours 05 mins as 22889 / 77 Digha Puri Express (54.45 km/h).

== Routeing ==
The 22890 / 89 / 78 / 77 Puri Digha Express was runs from Puri via Bhubaneswar, Cuttack, Balasore, Kharagpur Junction to Digha Flag Station .

== Traction ==
As the route is electrified now a Visakhapatnam or Santragachi-based WAP 4 hauls the train from Puri to Digha and Digha to Puri. Sometimes an Asansol-based WAG 5A/P hauls the train from Digha to Puri depending on the availability.

== Operation ==
22878 Puri Digha Express runs from Puri every Wednesday reaching Digha the next day .

22877 Digha Puri Express runs from Digha every Thursday reaching Puri the next day.

22890 Puri Digha Express runs from Puri every Saturday reaching Digha the next day .

22889 Digha Puri Express runs from Digha every Sunday reaching Puri the next day.
