= Thiruchendur Express =

The Chendur Express (16105/16106) is an superfast express train operated by the Southern Railway zone of the Indian Railways. This train connects Chennai Egmore and Tiruchendur in the Indian state of Tamil Nadu. It is the one and only train which directly connects Tiruchendur to the state capital Chennai. It runs almost full every day.

It shares its rakes with 16179/16180 Chennai Egmore - Mannargudi Mannai Express.

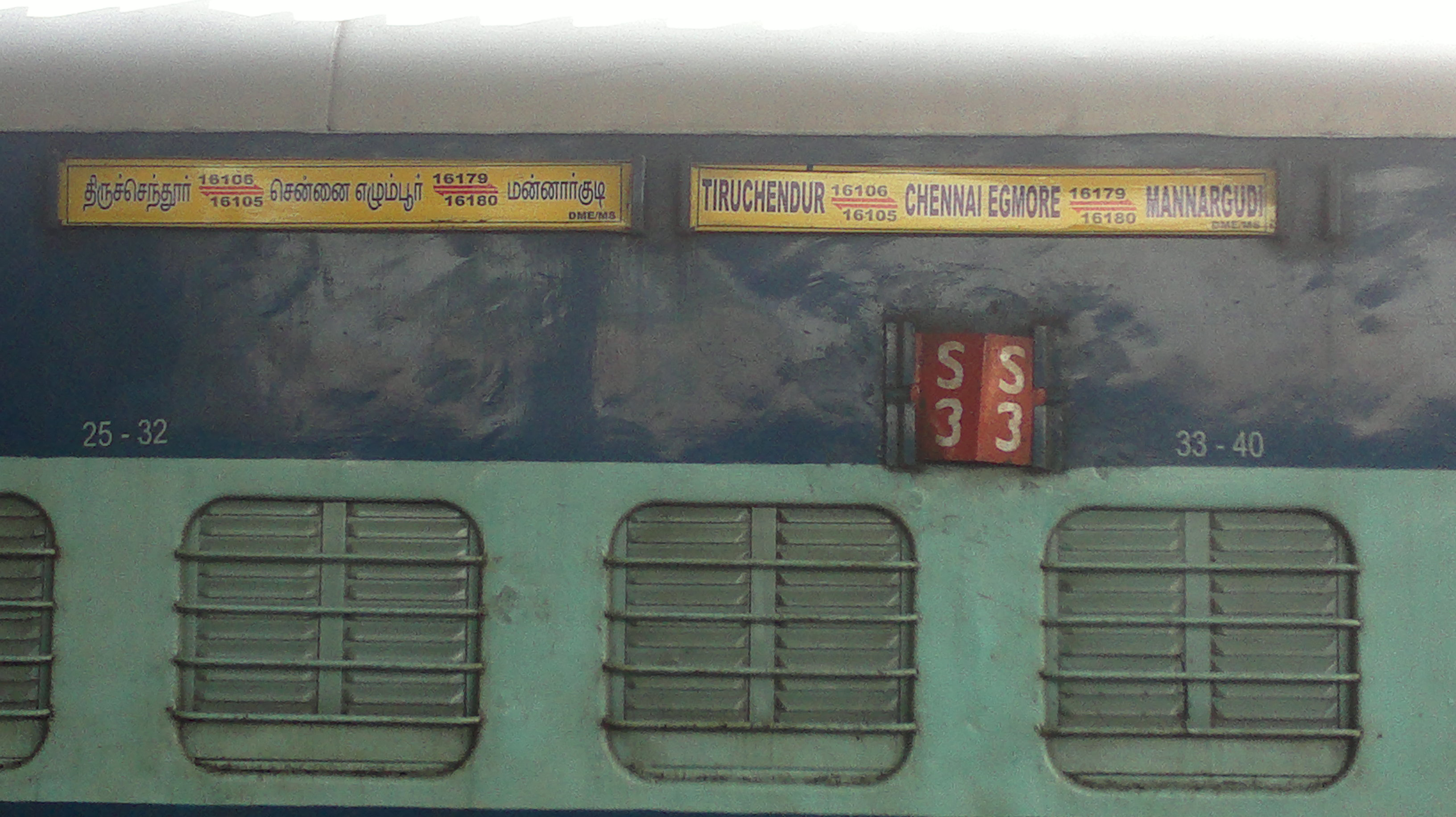
Tiruchendur express

== Coaches ==
It has 18 standard ICF Coaches with max speed of 110 kmph. Average Speed of this train is 48 kmph.

It consists,

1 AC First Class cum AC Two Tier (HA1)

1 AC Two Tier (A1)

1 AC Three Tier (B1)

9 Sleeper (S1 to S9)

4 General Coaches

== Schedule ==
16105 MS Tiruchendur Express departs Chennai Egmore every evening 16:00 IST (4:00 pm) and reaches Tiruchendur on next morning 08:05 IST (8:00 am)

16106 TCN Chennai Egmore Express departs Tiruchendur every evening 18:50 IST (6:50 pm) and reaches Chennai Egmore on next morning 10:50 IST (10:50 am)

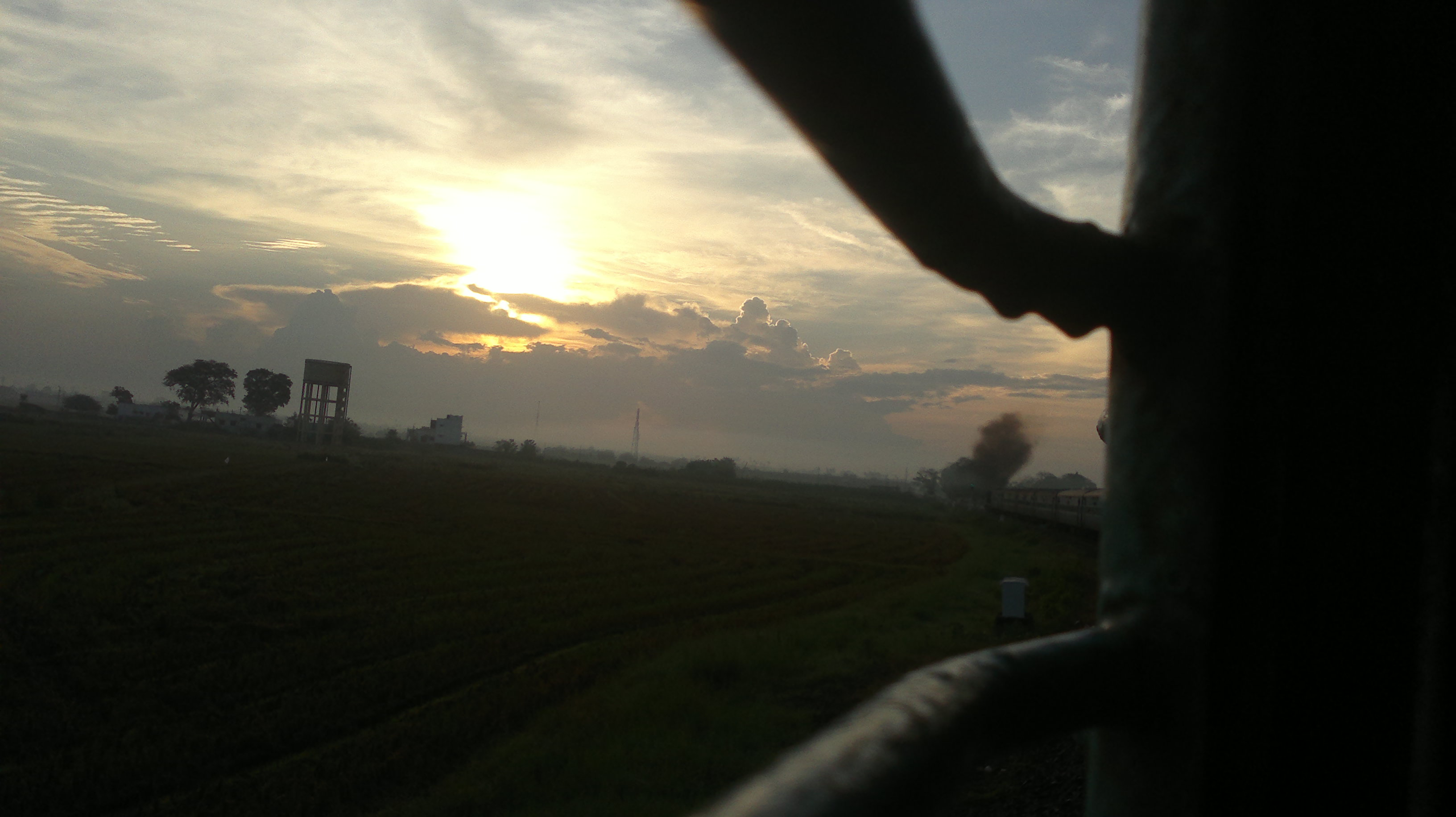
View from Tiruchendur exp.jpg

== Route ==
It runs via Chengalpattu, Villupuram, Panruti, Cuddalore Chidambaram, Sirkazhi, Vaitheeswarankoil, Mayiladuthurai, Kumbakonam, Thanjavur, Trichy, Madurai, Virudhunagar.
