= Delhi–Bareilly Express =

Overview
- Service type: Express
- Current operator: Northern Railways

Route
- Termini: Delhi; Bareilly
- Stops: 19 as 14556 Delhi–Bareilly Express, 18 as 14555 Bareilly–Delhi Express
- Distance travelled: 274 km (170 mi)
- Average journey time: 7 hours 10 mins as 14555 Bareilly–Delhi Express, 6 hours 50 mins as 14555 Bareilly–Delhi Express
- Service frequency: Daily
- Train number: 14555 / 56

On-board services
- Classes: AC 2 tier, AC 3 tier, Sleeper class, General Unreserved
- Seating arrangements: Yes
- Sleeping arrangements: Yes
- Catering facilities: No

Technical
- Rolling stock: Standard Indian Railways coaches
- Track gauge: 1,676 mm (5 ft 6 in)
- Operating speed: 110 km/h (68 mph) maximum 39.14 km/h (24 mph) including halts.

The 14556 / 55 Bareilly–Delhi Express is an Express train belonging to Indian Railways – Northern Railway zone that runs between Delhi & Bareilly in India.

It operates as train number 14556 from Delhi to Bareilly and as train number 14555 in the reverse direction, serving the states of Uttar Pradesh & Delhi.

== Coaches ==
The 14556 / 55 Bareilly–Delhi Express has 1 AC 2 tier, 2 AC 3 tier, 3 Sleeper class, 7 General Unreserved and 2 SLR (Seating cum Luggage Rake) coaches. It does not carry a pantry car.

As is customary with most train services in India, coach composition may be amended at the discretion of Indian Railways depending on demand.

== Service ==
The 14556 Bareilly–Delhi Express covers the distance of 274 km (170 mi) in 7 hours 10 mins (38.23 km/h) and in 6 hours 50 minutes as 14555 Delhi–Bareilly Express (40.10 km/h). As the average speed of the train is below 55 km/h (34 mph), as per Indian Railways rules, its fare does not include a Superfast surcharge.

== Routeing ==
The 14556 / 55 Bareilly–Delhi Express runs from Delhi via Ghaziabad Junction, Hapur Junction, Gajraula Junction, Moradabad, Chandausi to Bareilly.

== Traction ==
As large sections of the route are yet to be fully electrified, a Tughlakabad-based WDP-3A locomotive powers the train for its entire journey.
