= Nagpur–Jabalpur Express =

Nagpur Jabalpur Express
Overview
- Service type: Passenger
- Current operator(s): South East Central Railways

Route
- Termini: Nagpur Junction; Jabalpur Junction
- Distance travelled: 398 km (247 mi)
- Service frequency: Daily
- Train number(s): 58839 / 58840

On-board services
- Class(es): All
- Seating arrangements: Yes
- Sleeping arrangements: Yes
- Catering facilities: No Pantry car coach attached

Technical
- Rolling stock: Standard Indian Railways coaches

The 58839 / 40 Nagpur Jabalpur express is a passenger train belonging to Indian Railways - South East Central Railway zone that runs between Nagpur Junction and Jabalpur Junction in India.

It operates as train number 58839 from Nagpur Junction to Jabalpur Junction and as train number 58840 in the reverse direction serving the states of Maharashtra & Madhya Pradesh.

== Coaches ==
The express presently has 1 Sleeper Class, 8 Second Class seating & 2 SLR (Seating cum Luggage Rake) coaches. It does not have a Pantry car coach.

As is customary with most train services in India, coach composition may be amended at the discretion of Indian Railways depending on demand.

== Routeing ==
The express runs from Nagpur Junction via Patansaongi, Chhindwara Junction, Seoni, Nainpur Junction, Chorghatpipariya to Jabalpur Junction.

It reverses direction of travel at Chhindwara Junction & Nainpur Junction.

== Traction ==
As the route is not electrified, a diesel locomotive from the Nagpur Motibagh shed powers the train for its entire journey.
