= Gwalior–Chhindwara Express =

The Gwalior - Chhindwara Express was a bi-weekly express train which used to run between Gwalior Junction railway station of Gwalior and Chhindwara Junction railway station of Chhindwara. Both the cities are located in Madhya Pradesh. Recently Indian Railways Extended the train Up to Delhi Sarai Rohilla, so its running as Delhi - Chhindwara Patalkot Express.
