= Patna–Anand Vihar Terminal Express =

Train in India

Patna - Anand Vihar Terminal Express
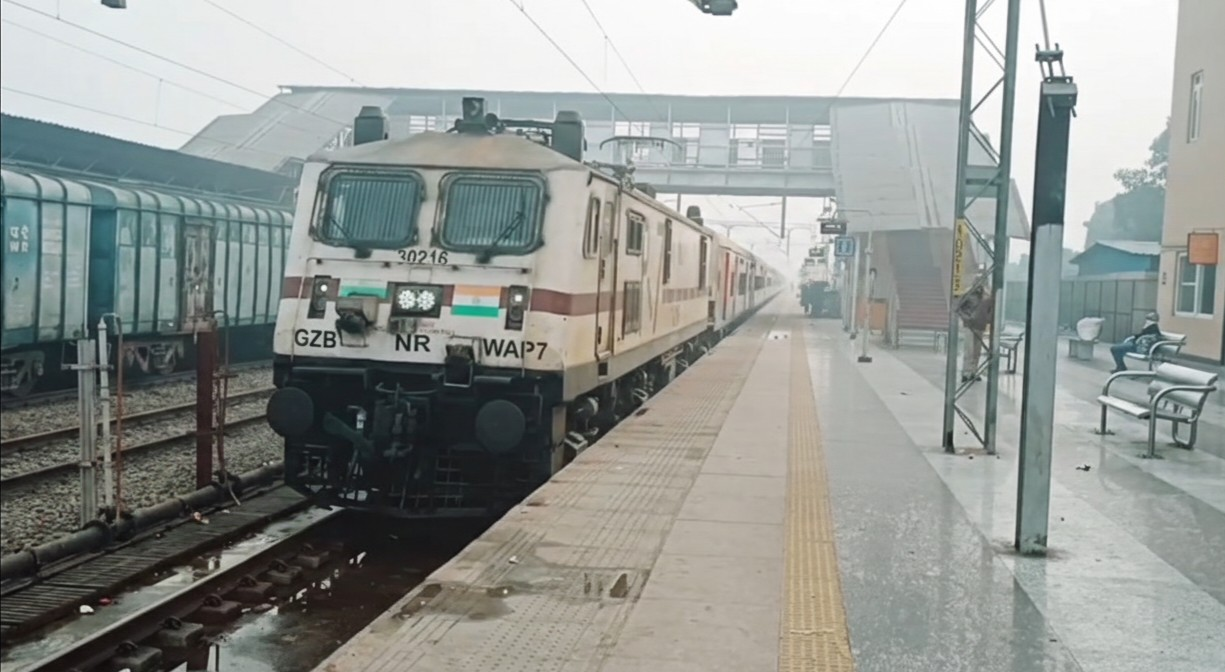
- PNBE - ANVT Express arriving at Danapur

Overview
- Service type: Express
- Status: Active
- Locale: Bihar, Uttar Pradesh and New Delhi
- First service: 7 December 2025; 4 months ago
- Current operator: East Central (EC)

Route
- Termini: Patna Junction (PNBE); Anand Vihar Terminal (ANVT)
- Stops: 8
- Distance travelled: 984 km (611 mi)
- Average journey time: 20h 15m
- Service frequency: Weekly
- Train number: 13251 / 13252

On-board services
- Classes: Chair Car, General Unreserved, Sleeper Class, AC 1st Class, AC 2nd Class, AC 3rd Class Economy, AC 3rd Class
- Seating arrangements: Yes
- Sleeping arrangements: Yes
- Catering facilities: Pantry Car
- Observation facilities: Large windows
- Baggage facilities: No
- Other facilities: Below the seats

Technical
- Rolling stock: LHB coach
- Track gauge: 1,676 mm (5 ft 6 in)
- Electrification: 25 kV 50 Hz AC Overhead line
- Operating speed: 130 km/h (81 mph) maximum, 49 km/h (30 mph) average including halts.
- Track owner: Indian Railways

The 13251 / 13252 Patna–Anand Vihar Terminal Express is an express train belonging to East Central Railway zone that runs between the city Patna Junction of Bihar and Anand Vihar Terminal of New Delhi, the capital city of India.

It operates as train number 13251 from Patna Junction to Anand Vihar Terminal and as train number 13252 in the reverse direction, serving the states of New Delhi, Uttar Pradesh and Bihar.

== Services ==
• 13251/ Patna–Anand Vihar Terminal Express has an average speed of 49 km/h and covers 984 km in 20h 15m.

• 13252/ Anand Vihar Terminal–Patna Express has an average speed of 52 km/h and covers 984 km in 19h 5m.

== Routes and halts ==
The Important Halts of the train are :

● Patna Junction

● Danapur

● Ara Junction

● Buxar

● Pt. Deen Dayal Upadhyaya Junction

● Prayagraj Junction

● Govindpuri

● Anand Vihar Terminal

== Schedule ==
• 13251 - 10:20 PM (Sunday & Thursday) [Patna Junction]

• 13252 - 11:30 PM (Monday & Friday) [Anand Vihar Terminal]

== Coach composition ==
1. General Unreserved - 4
2. Chair Car - 1
3. Sleeper Class - 6
4. AC 3rd Class Economy - 1
5. AC 3rd Class - 5
6. AC 2nd Class - 2
7. AC 1st Class - 1

== Traction ==
As the entire route is fully electrified it is hauled by a Ghaziabad Shed-based WAP-7 electric locomotive from Patna Junction to Anand Vihar Terminal and vice versa.

== Rake share ==
The train will Rake Sharing with Patna–Mumbai CSMT Superfast Express (22359/22360).

== See also ==
Trains from Patna Junction :

1. Patna–Ranchi Jan Shatabdi Express
2. Jaynagar–Patna Namo Bharat Rapid Rail
3. Archana Express
4. Patna–Kota Express
5. Patna–Ranchi Vande Bharat Express

Trains from Anand Vihar Terminal :

1. Anand Vihar Terminal–Ayodhya Cantonment Vande Bharat Express
2. North East Express
3. Gaya–Anand Vihar Garib Rath Express
4. West Bengal Sampark Kranti Express
5. Seemanchal Express

== Notes ==
a. Runs 2 day in a week with both directions.
