= Secunderabad–Manuguru Express =

Train in India

Secunderabad–Manuguru Superfast Express
Overview
- Service type: Superfast Express
- First service: 26 January 2011; 15 years ago
- Current operator: South Central Railway

Route
- Termini: Secunderabad (SC); Manuguru (MUGR)
- Stops: 9
- Distance travelled: 330 km (205 mi)
- Average journey time: 6 hours approx.
- Service frequency: Daily.
- Train number: 12745 / 12746

On-board services
- Classes: AC 2 Tier, AC 3 Tier, Sleeper Class, General Unreserved
- Seating arrangements: No
- Sleeping arrangements: Yes
- Catering facilities: E-catering
- Observation facilities: Large windows
- Baggage facilities: No
- Other facilities: Below the seats

Technical
- Rolling stock: ICF coach
- Track gauge: 1,676 mm (5 ft 6 in)
- Operating speed: 55 km/h (34 mph) average including halts

The 12745 / 12746 Secunderabad-Manuguru Superfast Express is a superfast express train operated between Secunderabad and Manuguru. It belongs to South Central Railway of Indian Railways.that daily runs between Secunderabad, Telangana and Manuguru town in Bhadradri Kothagudem District of Telangana. This is the Longest, fastest and the only OverNight running Intra-State Train of Telangana

== History ==
This train was initially started as a slip and link service between Secunderabad Jn and Dornakal Jn with Secunderabad-Machilipatnam Superfast Express and the slip coaches used to get separated at Dornakal and used to run with Dornakal Manuguru Passenger till Manuguru, This process continued till 2010 and the Railway Board Decided to Cancel the Link service permanently, and proposed to launch a triweekly train between Secunderabad and Manuguru.

In the Year 2011 the train was introduced as a daily Superfast Express with only 4 stops, as the train was not receiving good occupancy and daily running with an average delay of 2hours the railway board degraded its category from Superfast Express to Express by giving additional Halts. In year 2020 the Railways Upgraded its category from Express to Superfast Express.

== Route & Halts ==
Stops of these train are Secunderabad, Janagaon, Kazipet, Warangal, Mahabubabad, Garla, Dornakal, Karepalli, Bhadrachalam Road and Manuguru

== Traction ==
Both trains are hauled by a Lallaguda based WAP-7 locomotive from end to end.

== Coach composition ==
The train usually consists of 22 standard ICF coach:

- 1 AC Two Tier
- 3 AC Three Tier
- 9 Sleeper classes
- 5 General (unreserved)
- 2 SLR

As is customary with most other train services in India, coach composition may be amended at the discretion of Indian Railways, depending on demand.

Loco	1	2	3	4	5	6	7	8	9	10	11	12	13	14	15	16	17	18	19	20	21	22
	SLR	GEN	GEN	GEN	S1	S2	S3	S4	S5	S6	S7	S8	S9	B1	B2	B3	A1	GEN	GEN	SLR		

== Timetable ==
12745; Secunderabad Jn.-Manuguru.		Manuguru Express timetable			12746; Manuguru-Secunderabad Jn.	
Arrival	Departure	Station name	Station code	Distance (km)	Arrival	Departure
--:--	23:45	Secunderabad Jn	SC	0	03:45	--:--
00:49	00:50	Jangaon	ZN	83.6	01:42	01:43
01:39	00:40	Kazipet Jn	KZJ	131.7	01:04	01:05
01:52	01:55	Warangal	WL	141.9	00:54	00:55
02:41	02:43	Mahbubabad	MABD	202	00:09	00:10
02:54	02:55	Garla	GLA	222.7	23:44	23:45
03:04	03:05	Dornakal Jn	DKJ	226.5	23:34	23:35
03:39	03:40	Karepalli Jn	KRA	242	23:19	22:20
04:15	04:30	Bhadrachalam Road	BDCR	280.9	22:30	21:45
05:45	--:--	Manuguru	MUGR	330.2	--:--	21:40
