= Devlali–Bhusaval Passenger =

Indian passenger train

Devlali - Bhusaval Passenger
Overview
- Service type: Passenger
- Current operator: Central Railways

Route
- Termini: Devlali; Bhusawal Junction
- Stops: 30
- Distance travelled: 257 km (160 mi)
- Average journey time: 5 hours 15 minutes
- Service frequency: daily
- Train number: 51181 / 51182

On-board services
- Class: General Unreserved
- Seating arrangements: Yes
- Sleeping arrangements: No
- Catering facilities: No Pantry Car attached
- Other facilities: No

Technical
- Rolling stock: Standard Indian Railways coaches
- Track gauge: Broad Gauge

The 51181/51182 Devlali Bhusaval Passenger is a Passenger train belonging to Indian Railways that runs between Devlali and Bhusawal in India.

It operates as train number 51181 from Devlali to Bhusawal and as train number 52122 in the reverse direction.

== Service ==
Devlali Bhusaval Passenger has a total of 30 halts from Devlalai to Bhusawal and covers a distance of 257 km in 5 hours 15 minutes. The Devlali Bhusaval Passenger is a Passenger train that comes under Bhusawal Railway Division of Indian Railways.

== Routeing ==
The 51181/81 Devlali Bhusaval Passenger runs via Nashik, Manmad Junction, Chalisgaon Junction, Pachora Junction, Jalgaon Junction, to Bhusaval Junction.

== See also ==
- Indian Railways
