= Mumbai CSMT–Hingoli Deccan Jan Shatabdi Express =

Train in India

Overview
- Service type: Jan Shatabdi Express
- First service: 1 January 2011; 15 years ago (inaugural); 9 March 2024; 2 years ago (extended up to Hingoli Deccan)
- Current operator: Central Railway

Route
- Termini: Mumbai CSMT (CSMT); Hingoli Deccan (HNL)
- Stops: 12
- Distance travelled: 660 km (410 mi) (longest Janshatabdi train in all over India by distance )
- Average journey time: 12 hours 20 minutes
- Service frequency: Daily
- Train number: 12071 / 12072

On-board services
- Classes: AC Chair Car, Second Class Seating
- Seating arrangements: Yes
- Sleeping arrangements: No
- Auto-rack arrangements: Overhead racks
- Catering facilities: On-board catering E-catering
- Observation facilities: Rake sharing with 12109/12110 Panchvati Express
- Baggage facilities: Available

Technical
- Rolling stock: LHB coach
- Track gauge: 1,676 mm (5 ft 6 in)
- Operating speed: 53 km/h (33 mph) average including halts.

The Mumbai CSMT–Hingoli Deccan Jan Shatabdi is a day train (as it returns to the station of origin on the same day). It connects the historical District of Marathwada Hingoli to the state capital Mumbai. The actual origination station was extended to Jalna in August 2015 and later extended to Hingoli Deccan. The Jan Shatabdi Express is the fastest and most comfortable train option from Hingoli to Mumbai. It also helps connect other districts in Marathwada, like Hingoli ,Parbhani, Jalna, Chhatrapati Sambhaji Nagar, to the State Capital, Mumbai. It is the only Janshatabdi in Marathwada and the longest-distance-covering Janshatabdi train in India.

== Etymology ==
The name 'Jan' means people in Sanskrit language (and hence in many other Indian languages), hence this version of Shatabdi is meant for the ordinary people. Jan Shatabdi is an inter-city superfast train connecting major metropolitan cities, at a low price. This train can be considered a 'down-scale' version of Shatabdi trains.

=== Hingoli Jan Shatabdi ===
12071/72 – Hingoli Jan Shatabdi runs between CSMT Mumbai and Hingoli. It is a daily Super Fast offered by the Central Railway. It had been extended to CSMT Mumbai. As per the time table effective 1 July 2013, it has been reverted to Dadar & now shares its rake with the 12051/52 Dadar Madgaon JanShatabdi Express. The train initially used to terminate at Aurangabad but w.e.f. August 9, 2015 it has been extended to Jalna. Now it extended upto Hingoli

From Jalna the train is numbered 12072 and it departs at 04:20 am and reaches CSMT Mumbai at 4:50 thus taking approx. 12hrs 30mins hours to cover a distance of 660 km (410 mi). En route it halts at Parbhani, Jalna, Aurangabad, Manmad Junction, Nashik Road, Kalyan Junction and Thane. But it also stops at Kasara and Igatpuri as operational stops.

On the return journey, the train is numbered 12071 and departs from Dadar at 1400 hrs and arrives at Jalna at 2140 hrs.

The Hingoli Jan shatabdi is a fourteen-coach train and has ten Jan shatabdi class chair cars, two AC chair car and 2 luggage-cum-brake vans as part of its seating configuration.

== Locomotion ==
earlier was WDM-3A so was WDG-4D. As the route is completely electrified, it is hauled by a Kalyan Loco Shed-based WAP-7 electric locomotive from end to end.

== Gallery ==
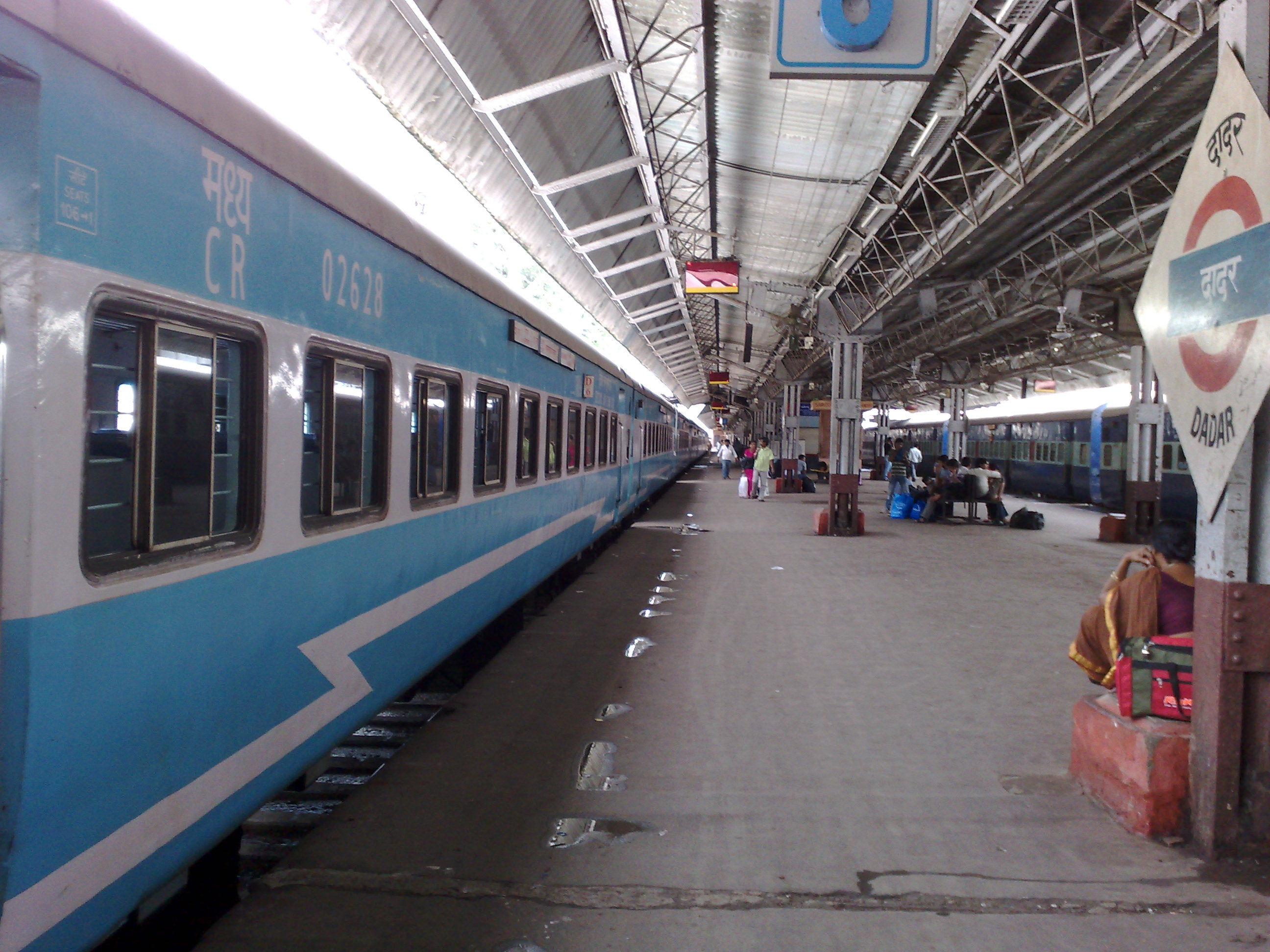
12072 Jan Shatabdi Express at Dadar station

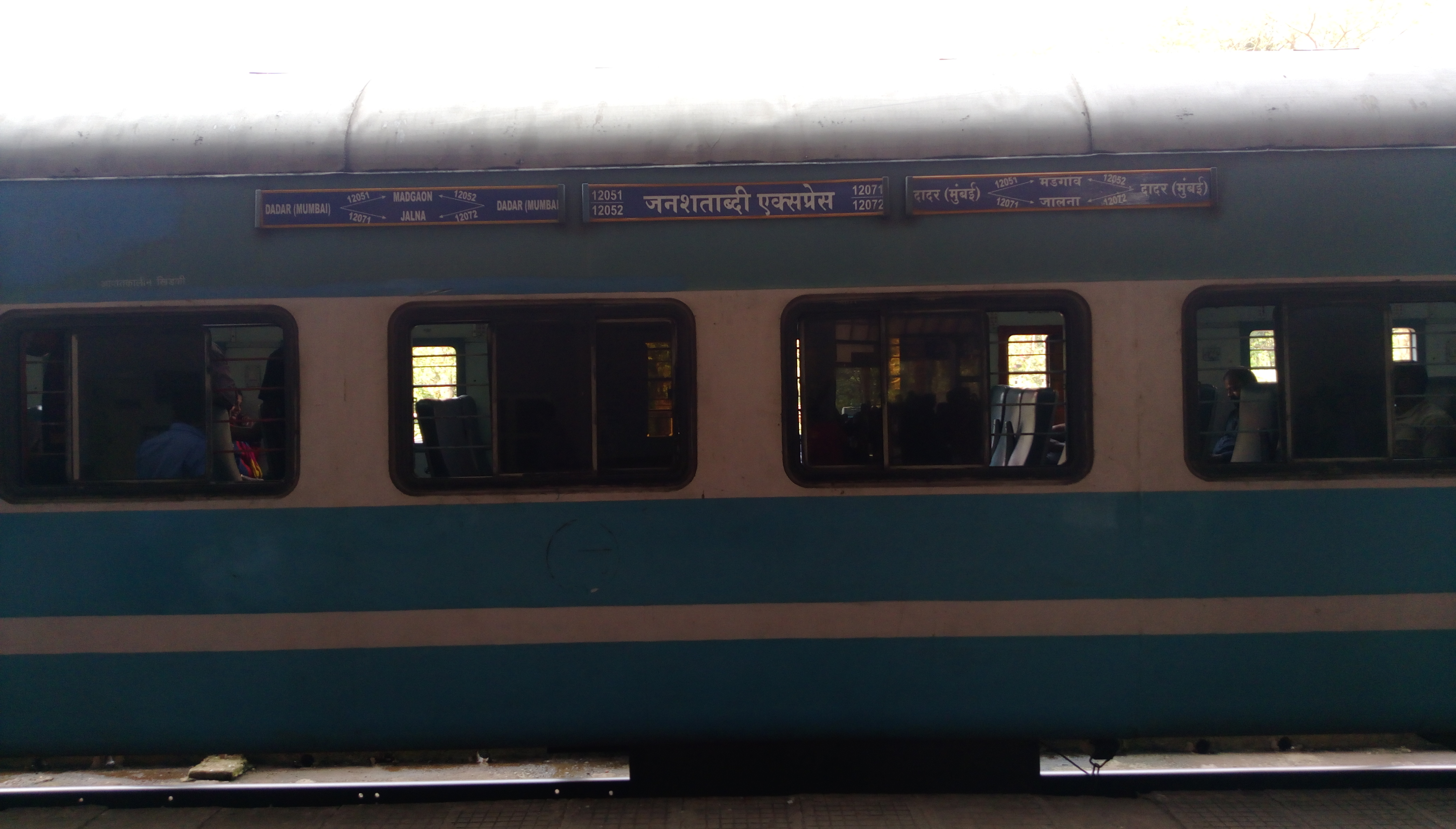
12072 Dadar T. - Jalna Jan Shatabdi Express - 2nd Class seating

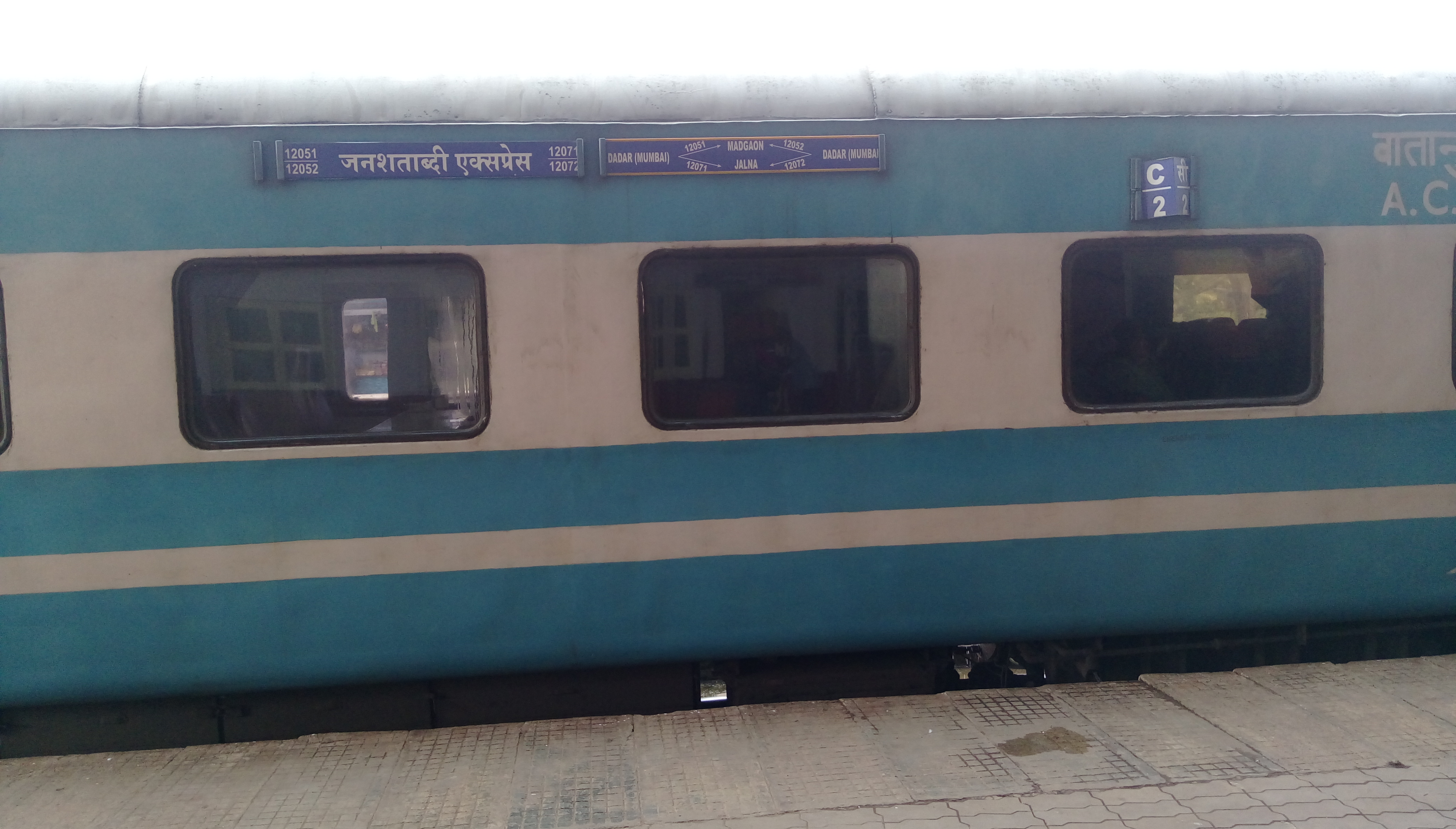
12072 Dadar T. - Jalna Jan Shatabdi Express - AC Chair Car

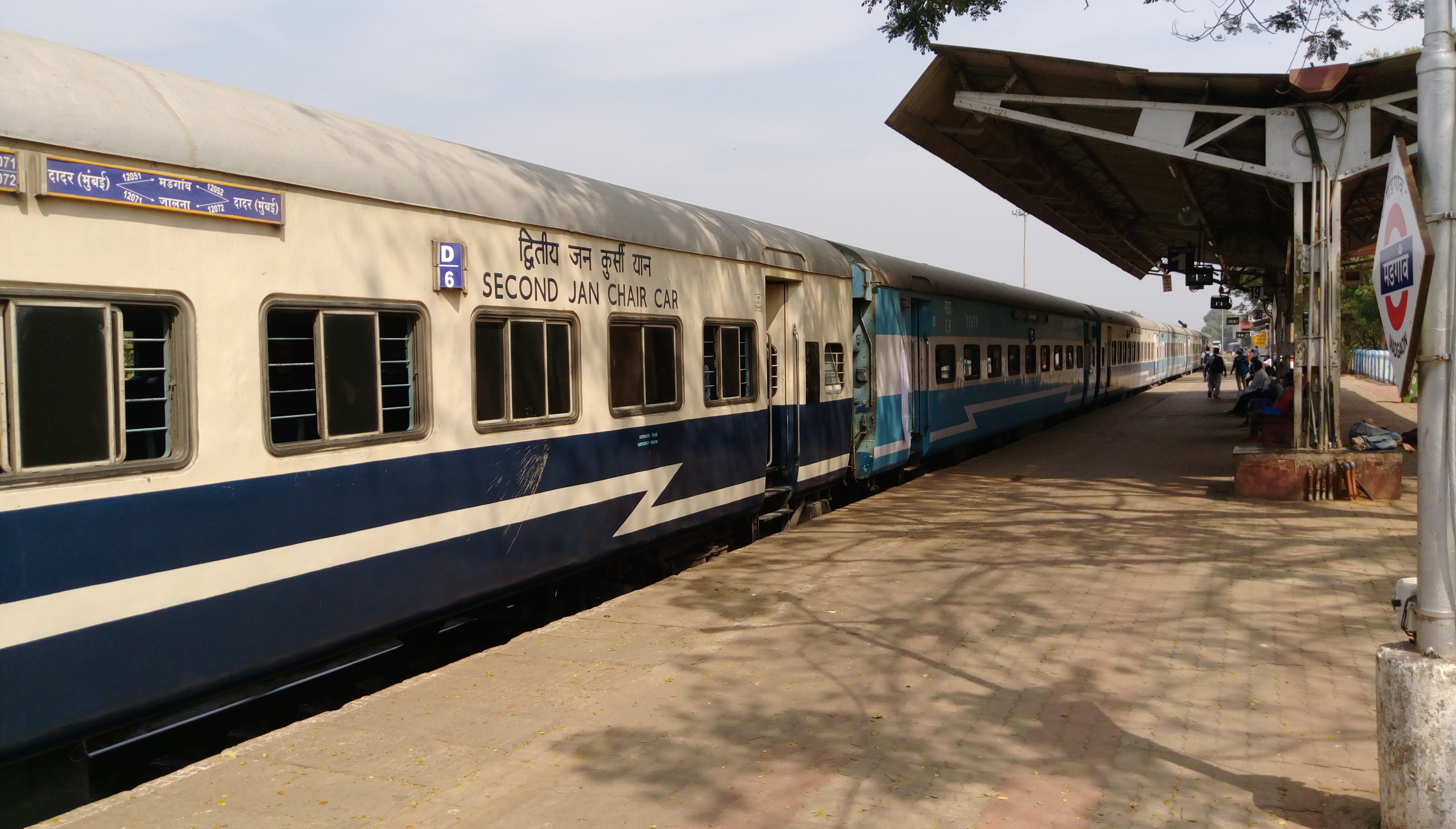
12072 Dadar T. - Jalna Jan Shatabdi Express

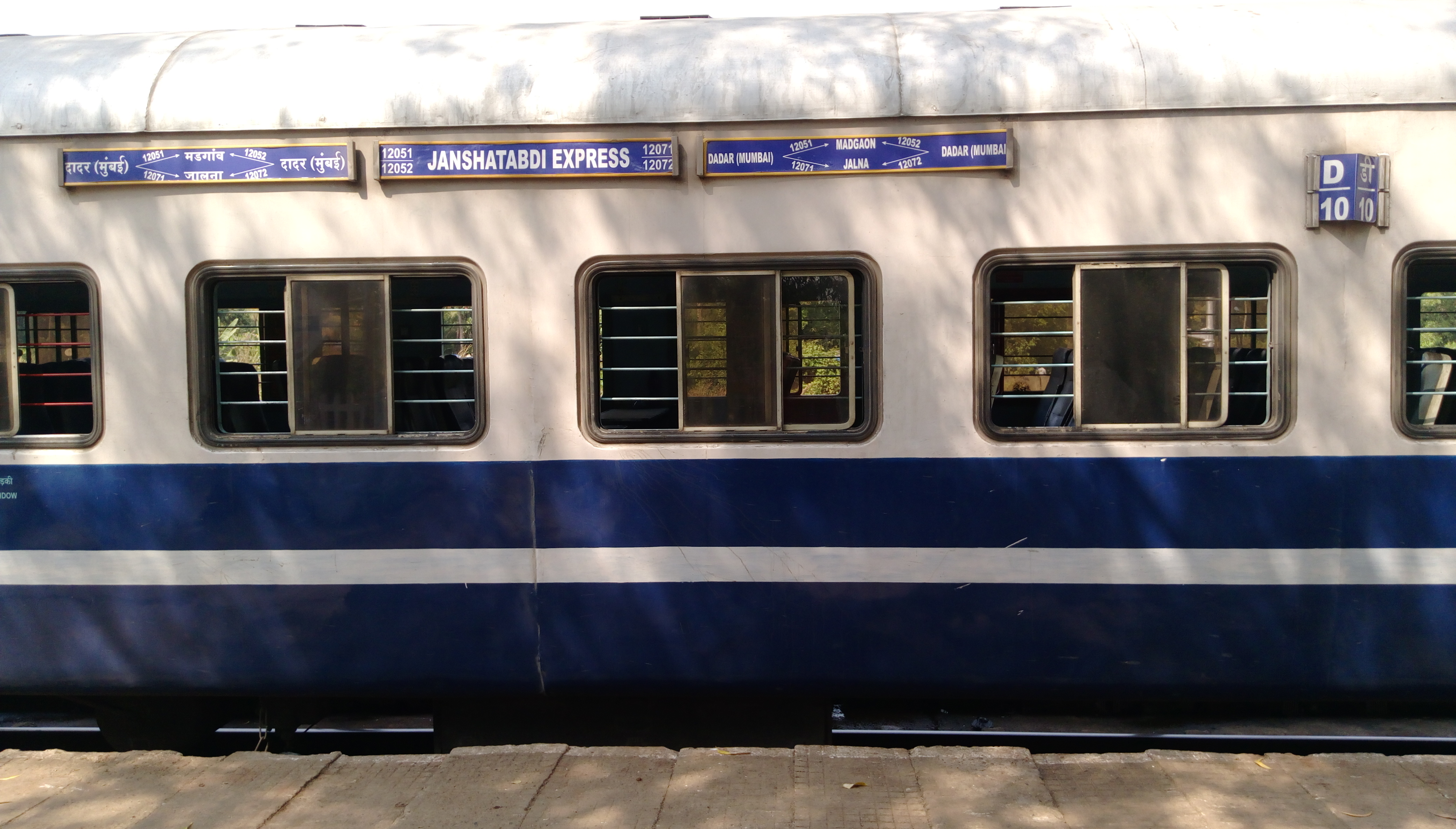
12072 Dadar T. - Jalna Jan Shatabdi Express - 10th Second class seating coach
