= Nagercoil Passenger =

Train in India

The Coimbatore Nagercoil Fast Passenger is an Indian passenger train which runs from Coimbatore Junction to Nagercoil Junction. It was one of the long-distance passenger shuttles in India. This Fast Passenger Service is converted into Express Train service and renamed as Coimbatore Nagercoil Express in the year 2020. Currently it runs as a day-time express service from Coimbatore to Nagercoil and vice versa. Owing to the conversion from fast passenger to express service, some of the stops for this train have been eliminated.

Important Stops for this train are:

- Coimbatore Junction
- Coimbatore North Junction
- Peelamedu
- Singanallur
- Irugur
- Somanur
- Tirupur
- Uthukuli
- Erode Junction
- Kodumudi
- Pugalur
- Karur Junction
- Dindigul junction
- Kodai Road
- Sholavandan
- Madurai Junction
- Tirupparankundram
- Tirumangalam
- Virudunagar junction
- Sattur
- Kovilpatti
- Vanchi maniyachi Junction
- Tirunelveli Junction
- Valliyur
- Nagercoil
