= Rajendra Nagar Patna–Indore Express =

The Rajendra Nagar Patna–Indore Express is an Express train which connects Patna with Indore on a weekly basis. It is allocated the number 19322 from Rajendra Nagar to Indore. The train consists of 22 coaches of AC 2 TIER, AC 3 TIER, SLEEPER, GENERAL and a brake van.
