= Yesvantpur–Jabalpur Superfast Express =

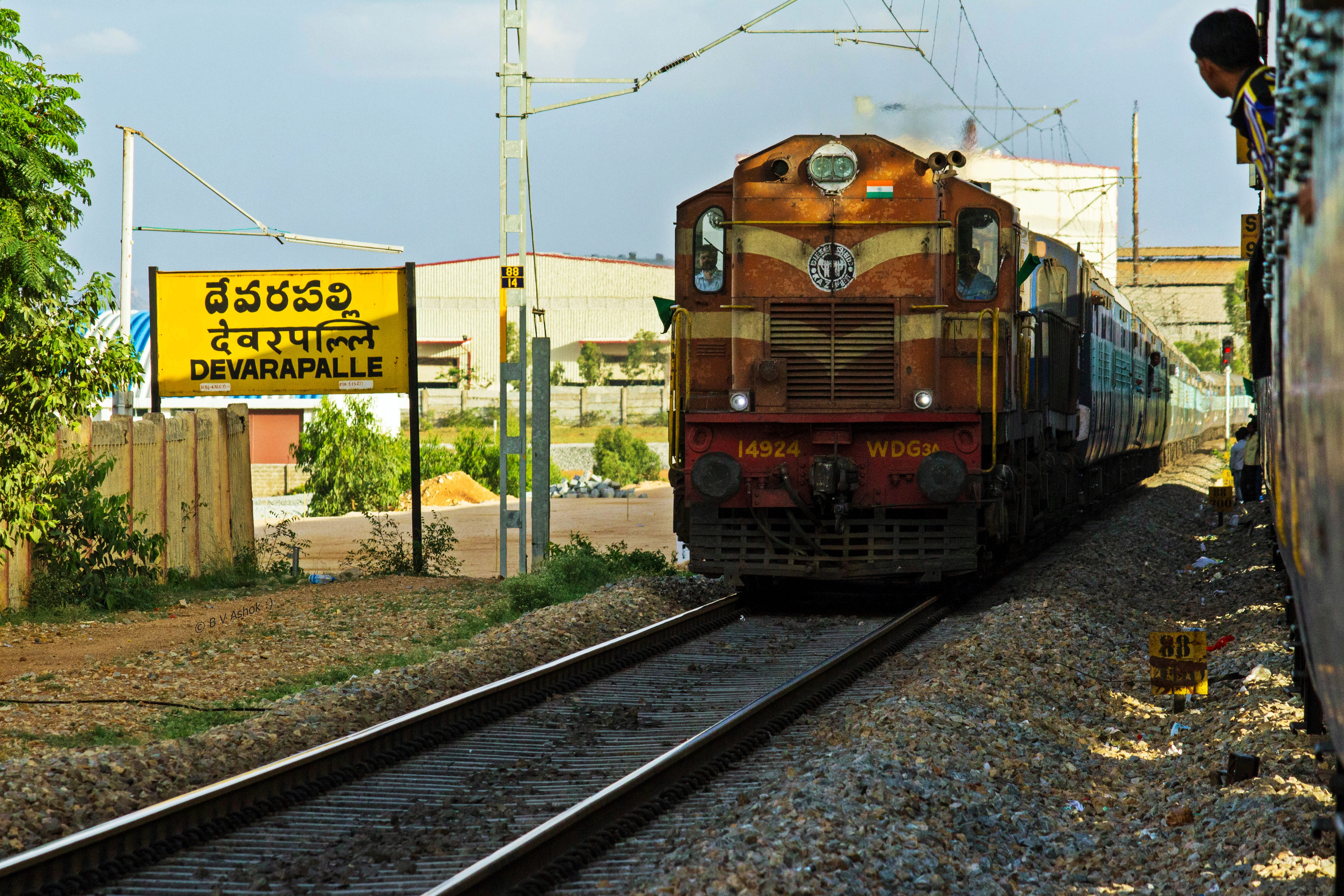
Yesvantpur – Jabalpur Superfast Express at Devarapalle en route Yesvanthpur in 2017

The Jabalpur – Yeshwantpur (Bangalore) Weekly Express (Train No :12194) is a 2014 launched, 2013 announced train service in the rail budget 2013–2014 by rail minister, Pawan Bansal.

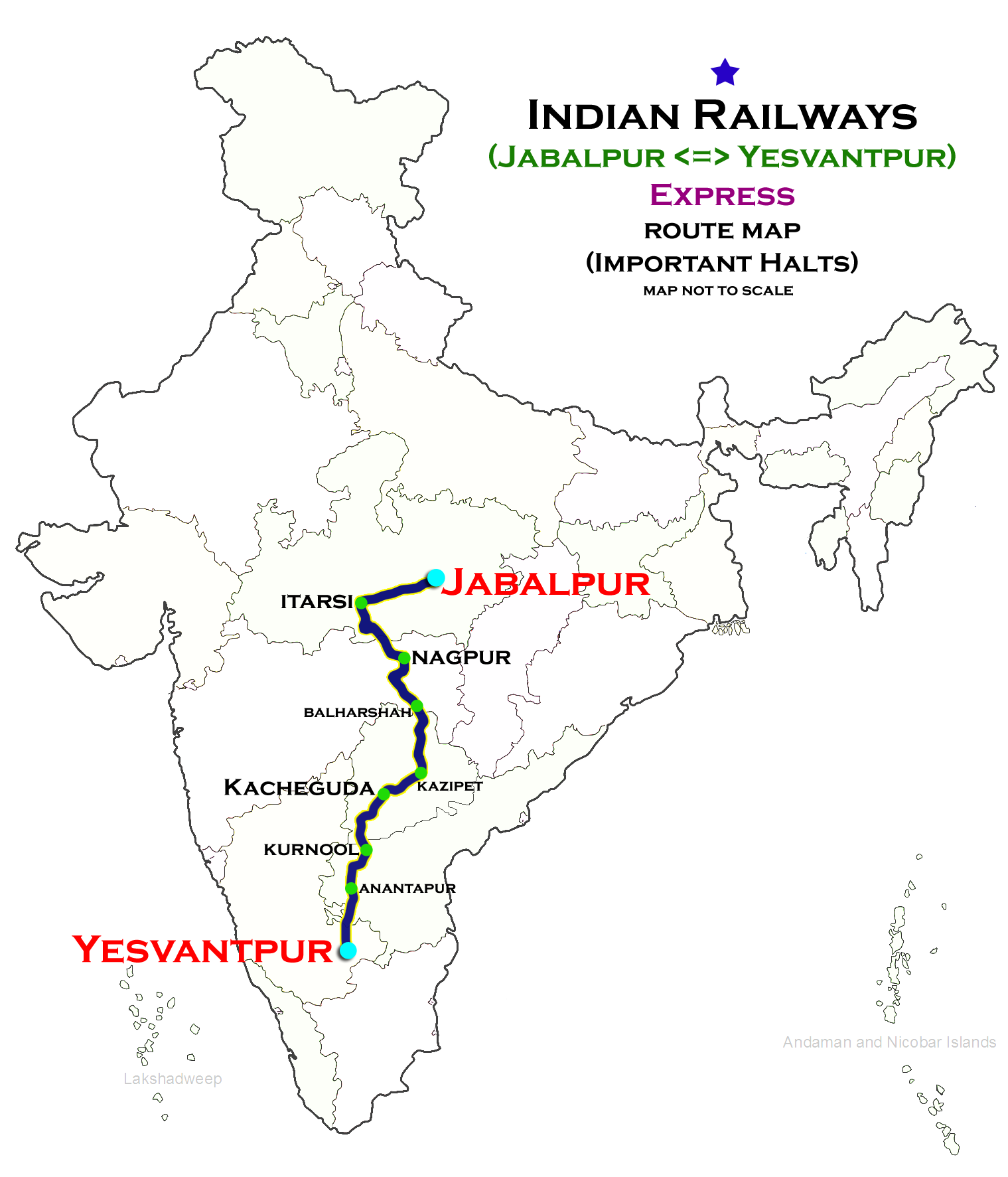
(Jabalpur – Yesvantpur) Express route map

== Origin and destination ==
The train runs between Jabalpur Junction on Saturday, the main railway station of Important military hub of central Indian state, Madhya Pradesh and Yeshwantpur railway station, the sub urban railway station of Bengaluru, the capital city of Karnataka.

The train is the fifth point to point connection of Jabalpur with Bengaluru after Sanghamitra Express, Bagmati Express, Lucknow – Jabalpur – Yeshwantpur Express and Bareilly Express (not to be confused with Bareilly – New Bhuj Ala Hazrat Express).

== Schedule ==
Train Number	Station Code	Departure Station	Departure Time	Departure Day	Arrival Station	Arrival Time	Arrival Day
12193	YPR	Yesvantpur	3:50 PM	Sunday	Jabalpur	10:30 PM	Monday
12194	JBP	Jabalpur	6:45 AM	Saturday	Yesvantpur	1:30 PM	Sunday

== RSA – Rake sharing ==
11449 / 11450 – Jabalpur – Shri Mata Vaishno Devi Katra – Durgavati Express

== Coach composite ==
The train will consist of 22 coaches:

- 2 AC II Tier
- 4 AC III Tier
- 9 Sleeper
- 4 General
- 2 SLR/EOG
- 1 Pantry

Loco	1	2	3	4	5	6	7	8	9	10	11	12	13	14	15	16	17	18	19	20	21	22
	EOG	GS	GS	S1	S2	S3	S4	S5	S6	S7	S8	S9	PC	B1	B2	B3	B4	A1	A2	GS	GS	EOG

== Route and halt ==
The train travels via. Dharmawaram Junction. Kachiguda(Hyderabad), kazipet, Ramagundam, Balharshah, Nagpur, Itarsi

== Traction ==
it was hauled end to end by WDM-3A
