= Indore–Maksi Passenger =

Train in India

Indore - Maksi Passenger
Overview
- Service type: passenger
- Locale: Madhya Pradesh
- First service: 1999
- Current operator(s): Western Railway

Route
- Termini: Indore Junction; Maksi Junction
- Stops: 5
- Distance travelled: 81 km (50 mi)
- Average journey time: 1.4 hours
- Service frequency: Daily
- Train number(s): 59379DN / 59380UP

On-board services
- Class(es): Chair Cars fully Unreserved
- Seating arrangements: Yes
- Sleeping arrangements: No
- Catering facilities: No

Technical
- Operating speed: 40 km/h (25 mph) average with halts

The Indore – Maksi Passenger is a passenger train of Indian Railways, which runs between Indore Junction railway station of Indore, the largest city & commercial hub of Central Indian state Madhya Pradesh and Maksi Junction railway station of Maksi, Madhya Pradesh.

== Arrival and departure ==
Train no.59379 departs from Indore daily at 05:45 hrs. from platform no.5 reaching Maksi, the same day at 07:30. Train no.59380 departs from Maksi, daily at 10:15 hrs., reaching Indore the same day at 12:00.

== Route and halts ==
The train goes via Dewas Junction. The important halts of the train are:

- INDORE JUNCTION
- Indore Lakshmibai Nagar
- Dewas
- Ajitkheri
- MAKSI JUNCTION

== Coach composite ==
The train consists of 12 chair car unreserved coaches.

== Average speed and frequency ==
The train runs with an average speed of 35 km/h. The train runs on a daily basis.

== Loco link ==
The train is hauled by Ratlam RTM WDM-3 Diesel engine.

== Rake maintenance & sharing ==
The train is maintained by the Indore Coaching Depot. The same rake is used for Indore–Chhindwara Panchvalley Express, one way which is altered by the second rake on the other way.
