= Bhopal Janata Express =

Train service in India

The Bhopal Janata Express was the train service which used to run between Bhopal Junction railway station (formerly Bhopal station) of Bhopal, the capital city of Madhya Pradesh and Mumbai Central railway station (formerly Bombay Central) of Mumbai, the capital city of Maharashtra. The train is now altered to Kushinagar Express, which is the extended version of Mumbai–Bhopal Janata Express.

== History ==
The Bhopal Janata Express service was announced in 1953 between Bhopal and Mumbai to be operated on a tri-weekly basis with a total of 11 coaches including 5 general, 4 sleeper and 1 luggage van. It used to run from Bhopal on every Monday, Wednesday and Saturday while from Mumbai on every Tuesday, Friday and Saturday. Later, in 1957, the train was made daily. It got a total of 17 coaches including 1 AC first class, 2 AC 3 tier, 8 sleeper, 5 general coach and 1 luggage cum parcel van.

Later, in 1970, the train got two new versions:

1. Bhopal–Mumbai Janata Express (triweekly)
2. Bhopal–Lucknow Janata Express (biweekly)

Within a few months, to attract more passengers, the train from Mumbai and Bhopal got bifurcated to its new version, Mumbai–Bhopal–Lucknow Janata Express with additions of more coaches and a pantry car. The other version of the train between Bhopal and Lucknow now runs as a separate train Bhopal–Lucknow Express and the Bhopal–Lucknow Janata Express altered to Kushinagar Express

In 2002, a new service between Bhopal and Mumbai on a weekly basis (Bhopal–Mumbai Express) was started to maintain reservation quota for Bhopal people due to alteration of Bhopal–Mumbai Janata Express.

== Final extension ==
In 1983, the train route was studied again and as per the demands, the Bhopal Janata Express train was finally extended to Gorakhpur by extending it from Lucknow and now the train runs as Lokmanya Tilak Terminus (Mumbai)–Gorakhpur Kushinagar Express.
