= Yesvantpur–Ahmedabad Weekly Express =

Passenger train

Yesvantpur–Ahmedabad Express
Overview
- Service type: Express
- First service: 2009
- Current operator: South Western Railways

Route
- Termini: Yesvantpur Junction; Ahmedabad Junction
- Distance travelled: 1,799 km (1,118 mi)
- Average journey time: 38 hours 15 minutes
- Service frequency: Weekly
- Train number: 16501 / 16502

On-board services
- Classes: AC first class, AC two tier, AC 3 tier, sleeper, pantry, second class, unreserved
- Seating arrangements: Yes
- Sleeping arrangements: Yes
- Catering facilities: Yes

Technical
- Rolling stock: LHB coach
Route map
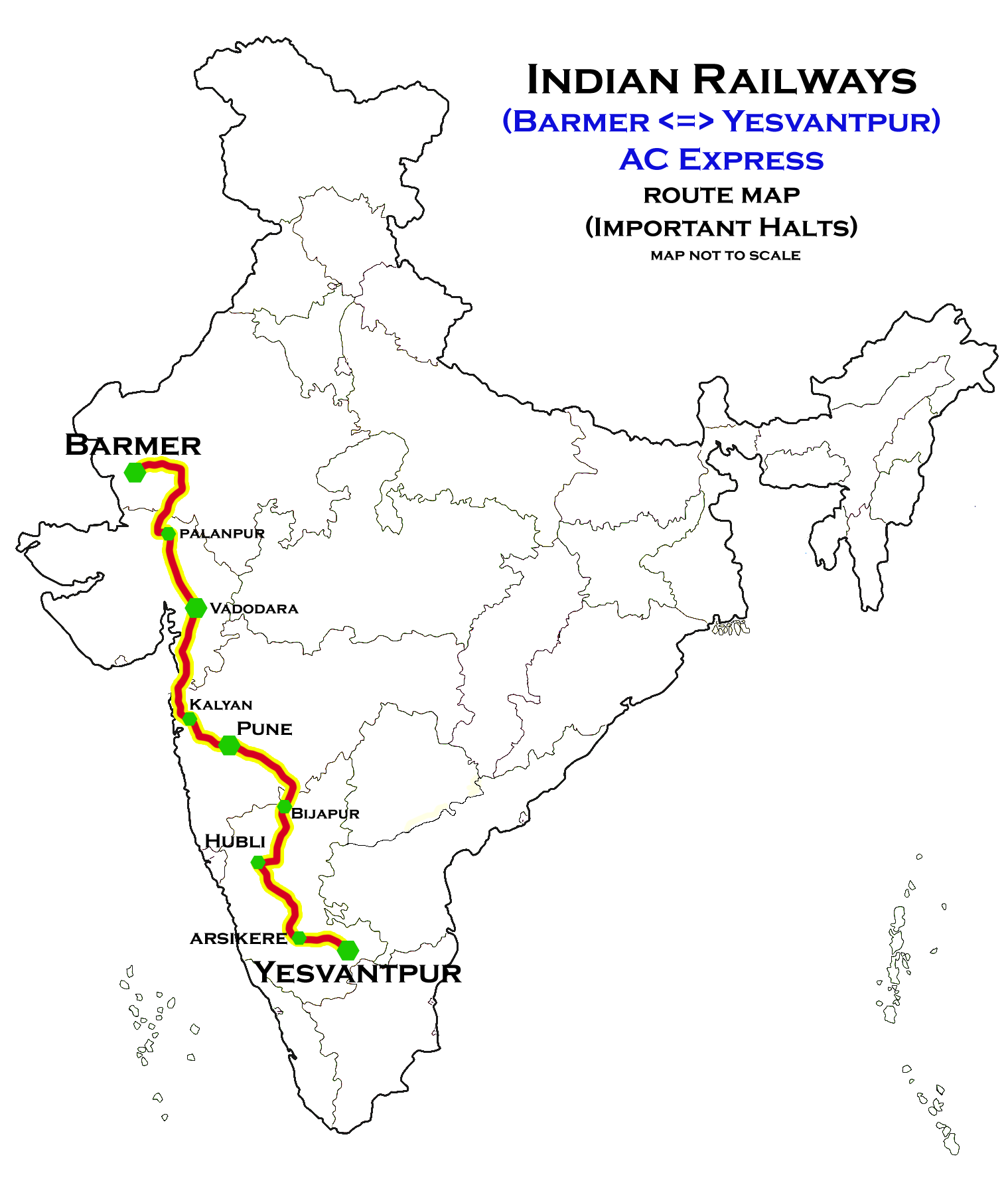

The Yesvantpur Ahmedabad Weekly Express is a passenger train that runs from Yesvantpur in Bangalore to Ahmedabad. The train traverses 1798 km.

== Service ==
The average speed of the train is 52 km per hour. The train belongs to the South Western zone and is an AC mail and express train type.

From 2 May 2014, the train number has changed to 14805/14806, and a new station, Barmer, was added to the journey.

== Coaches ==
The train doesn't have an AC 1st tier coach; it has the AC 2nd and AC 3rd tier coaches, sleeper coaches and unreserved coaches; it has second class coaches also.
