= Dehradun–Amritsar Express =

Train in India

Dehradun-Amritsar Express
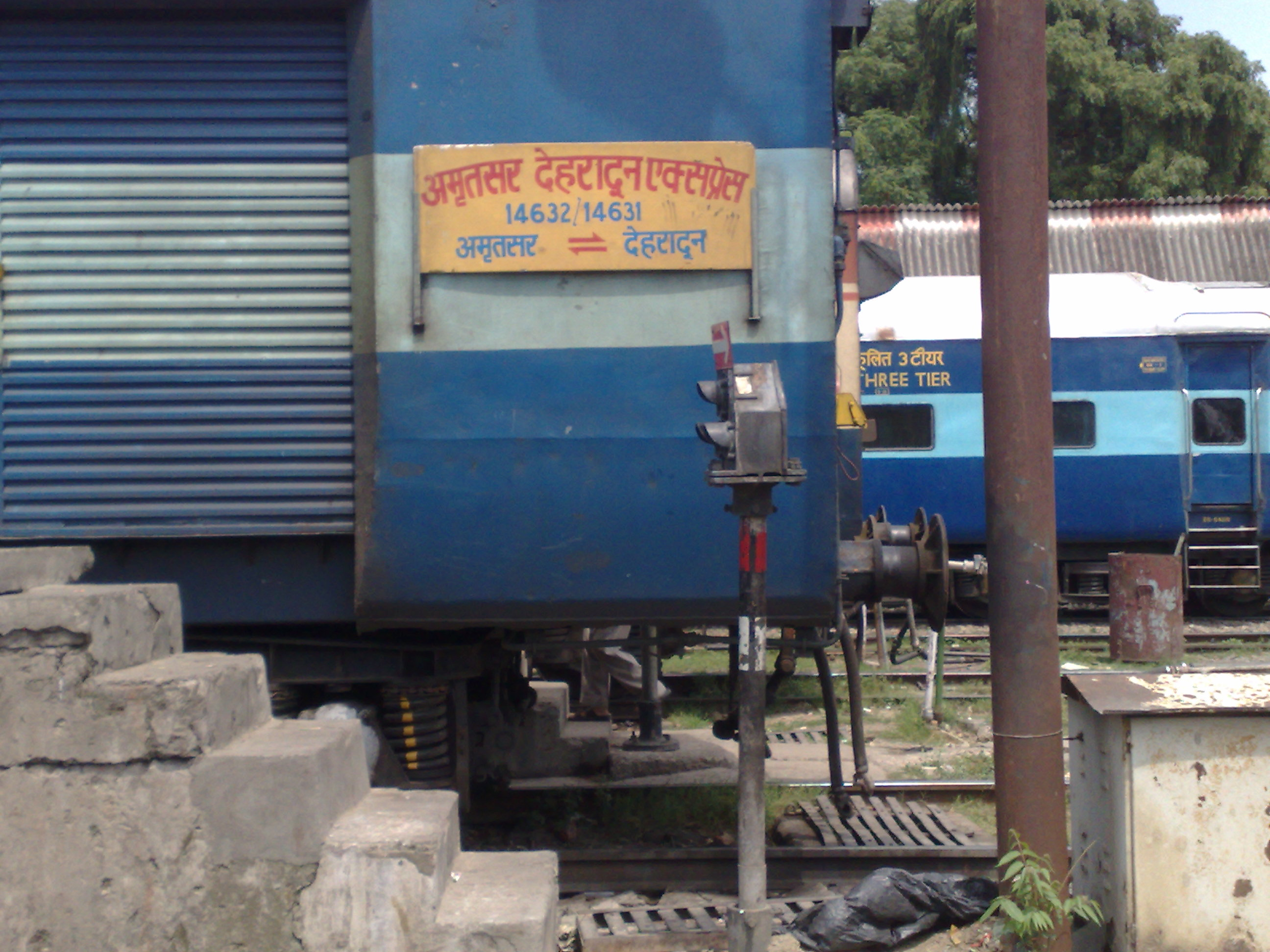

Overview
- Service type: Express
- Locale: Uttrakhand, Uttar Pradesh, Haryana & Punjab
- Current operator(s): Northern Railway

Route
- Termini: Dehradun (DDN); Amritsar (ASR)
- Stops: 27
- Distance travelled: 463 km (288 mi)
- Average journey time: 11 hours 45 minutes
- Service frequency: Daily
- Train number(s): 14631 / 14632

On-board services
- Class(es): AC 3 tier, Sleeper Class, General Unreserved
- Seating arrangements: Yes
- Sleeping arrangements: Yes
- Catering facilities: On-board catering, E-catering
- Baggage facilities: No
- Other facilities: Below the seats

Technical
- Rolling stock: ICF coach
- Track gauge: 1,676 mm (5 ft 6 in)
- Operating speed: 110 km/h (68 mph) maximum, 40 km/h (25 mph) average including halts.

The 14631 / 14632 Dehradun-Amritsar Express is an Express train belonging to Indian Railways - Northern Railway zone that runs between Dehradun and Amritsar Junction in India.

It operates as train number 14631 from Dehradun to Amritsar Junction and as train number 14632 in the reverse direction serving the four states of Uttarakhand, Uttar Pradesh, Haryana and Punjab.

== History ==
Before Partition, this train was used to run Between Lahore and Dehradun as Lahori Express but shortened up to Amritsar after Partition

== Coaches ==
The 14631 / 32 Dehradun Amritsar Express presently has 2 AC 3 tier, 8 Sleeper Class, 4 General Unreserved & 2 SLR (Seating cum Luggage Rake) coaches. It does not carry a Pantry car coach.

As is customary with most train services in India, Coach Composition may be amended at the discretion of Indian Railways depending on demand.

== Service ==
The 14631 Dehradun Amritsar Express covers the distance of 463 kilometres in 12 hours 25 mins [39.40 km/h (24 mph)] & in 12 hours 30 mins as 14632 Amritsar Dehradun Express [38.58 km/h (24 mph)].

== Routeing ==
The 14631 / 32 Dehradun - Amritsar Express runs from Dehradun via Haridwar Junction, Laksar Junction, Saharanpur Junction, Ambala Cantonment Junction, Ludhiana Junction to Amritsar Junction.

It reverses direction of travel at Laksar Junction.

== Traction ==
As the route is electrified, it is hauled by a Ghaziabad Loco Shed based WAP-7 electric locomotive on its entire journey.

== Timings ==
14631 Dehradun Amritsar Express leaves Dehradun on a daily basis at 19:00 hrs IST and reaches Amritsar Junction at 07:30 hrs IST the next day.

14632 Amritsar Dehradun Express leaves Amritsar Junction on a daily basis at 22:10 hrs IST and reaches Dehradun at 10:35 hrs IST the next day.
