= Pune–Kazipet Weekly Superfast Express =

Overview
- Service type: Superfast
- Locale: Maharashtra and Telangana
- First service: 20 October 2017; 8 years ago
- Current operator: Central Railway zone

Route
- Termini: Pune Junction (PUNE); Kazipet Junction (KZJ)
- Stops: 17
- Distance travelled: 1,178 km (732 mi)
- Average journey time: 20h 50m
- Service frequency: Weekly (Note: Runs one day in a week for every direction.)
- Train number: 22151/22152

On-board services
- Classes: AC 2 tier, AC 3 tier, Sleeper class, General/Unreserved
- Seating arrangements: No
- Sleeping arrangements: Yes
- Catering facilities: On-board catering E-catering
- Entertainment facilities: No
- Baggage facilities: No
- Other facilities: Below the seats

Technical
- Rolling stock: 2
- Track gauge: 1,676 mm (5 ft 6 in)
- Operating speed: 57 km/h (35 mph), including halts

The Pune–Kazipet Weekly Superfast Express is a Superfast train belonging to Central Railway zone that runs between Pune Junction and Kazipet Junction in India. It is currently being operated with 22151/22152 train numbers on a weekly basis.

== Service ==
The 22151/Pune–Kazipet Weekly Superfast Express has average speed of 57 km/h and covers 1178 km in 20h 50m. The 22152/Kazipet–Pune Weekly Superfast Express has average speed of 55 km/h and covers 1178 km in 21h 35m.

== Route and halts ==
The halts of the train are:

- Pune Junction
- Daund Junction
- Ahilyanagar
- Kopargaon
- Manmad Junction
- Bhusaval Junction
- Shegaon
- Akola Junction
- Badnera Junction
- Dhamangaon
- Pulgaon Junction
- Wardha Junction
- Hinganghat
- Warora
- Bhandak
- Chandrapur
- Balharshah Junction
- Sirpur Kaghaznagar
- Ramagundam
- Peddapalli Junction
- Kazipet Junction

== Coach composition ==
The train has standard ICF rakes with maximum speed of 110 kmph. The train consists of 20 coaches:

- 1 AC 2 Tier
- 5 AC 3 Tier
- 8 Sleeper
- 4 General Unreserved
- 2 Seating cum Luggage

== Traction ==
Both trains are hauled by a Bhusawal Loco Shed or Lallaguda Loco Shed-based WAP-4 electric locomotive from Pune to Kazipet and vice versa.

== See also ==
- Pune Junction railway station
- Kazipet Junction railway station
