= Nagpur–Bhusawal Superfast Express =

Nagpur - Bhusawal SF Express
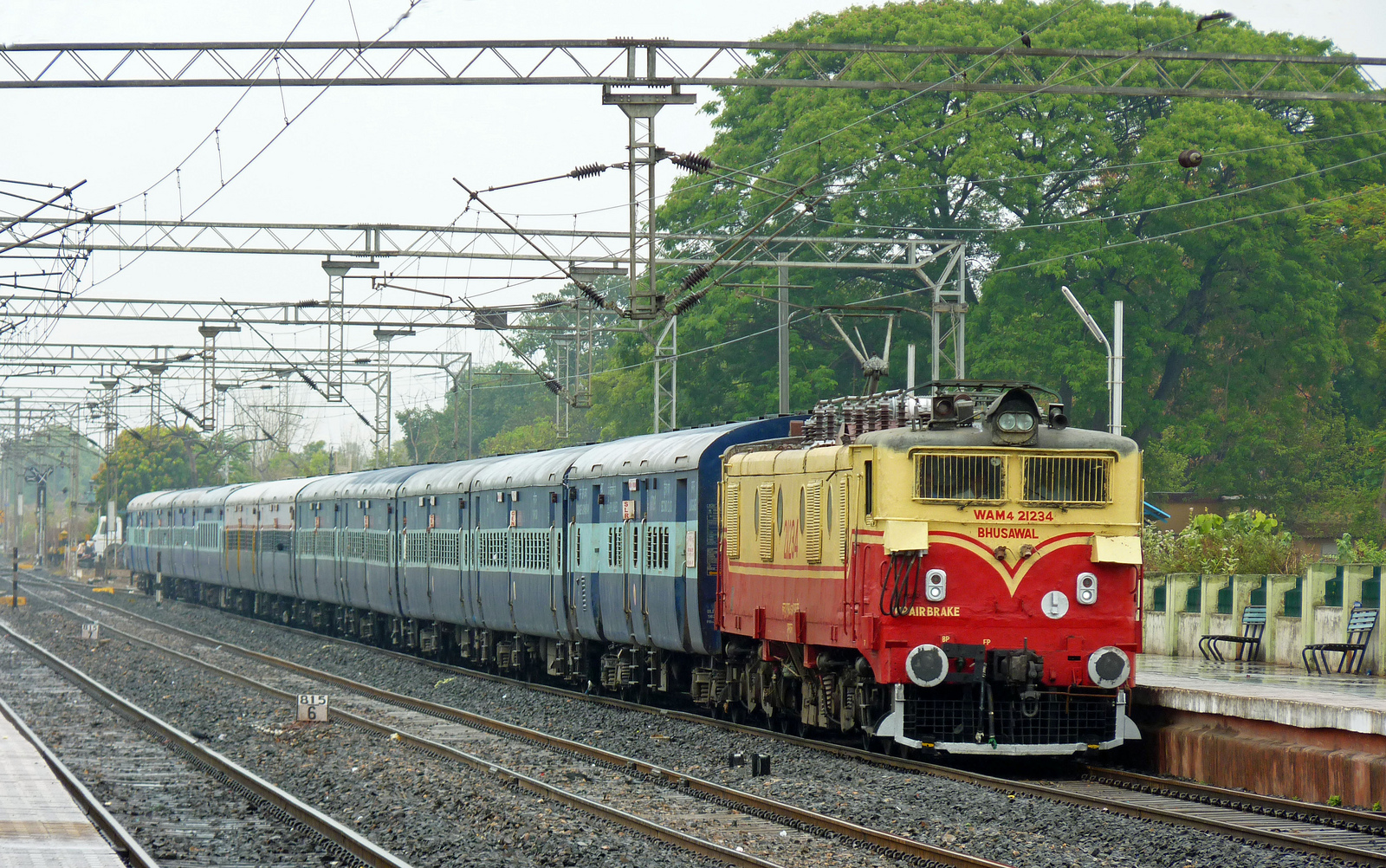
- Nagpur - Bhusawal Express at Ghoradongri Railway Station.

Overview
- Service type: Superfast
- Locale: Maharashtra, Madhya Pradesh
- Current operator: Central Railway

Route
- Termini: Nagpur; Bhusawal
- Stops: 15
- Distance travelled: 604 km (375 mi)
- Average journey time: 10 hours 25 Min approx
- Service frequency: Tri Weekly
- Train number: 22111DN / 22112UP

On-board services
- Class(es): AC Chair Car, Second Setting, Unreserved
- Seating arrangements: Yes

Technical
- Operating speed: 57 km/h (35 mph) average with halts

The Nagpur - Bhusawal S.F. Express is a tri weekly superfast mail/express train of Indian Railways, which runs between Nagpur railway station of Nagpur, the largest city and BhusawalMaharashtra. The train runs with an average speed of 57 km/h (35 mph).

This train is only direct connectivity for Harda and Khandwa from Amla Junction, Betul and Ghoradongri.

== Arrival and departure ==
Train no.22111 departs from Bhusawal every Sunday, Wednesday and Friday at 05:35 hrs. from platform no.1 reaching Nagpur the same day at 16:00 hrs. at platform no. 1

Train no.22112 departs from Nagpur, every Monday, Thursday and Saturday at 07:20 hrs., reaching Bhusawal the same day at 17:45 hrs. at platform no. 3

== Route and halts ==
The Train goes via Itarsi Junction and Khandwa. The Important Halt of This train are-

- Nagpur
- Katol
- Narkher
- Pandhurna
- Multai
- Amla Junction
- Betul
- Ghoradongri
- Itarsi Junction
- Harda
- Khirkiya
- Chhanera
- Khandwa Junction
- Nepanagar
- Burhanpur
- Bhusawal

== Coach composite ==
The train consists of 10 coaches Loco- SLR; GEN; GEN; GEN; GEN; GEN;C1; D1; D2; SLR (Nagpur To Itarsi)

Loco - SLR; D2; D1; C1; GEN; GEN; GEN; GEN; GEN; SLR (Itarsi to Bhusawal)

- Unreserved - 5
- Second Setting - 2
- AC Chair Car - 1
- SLR - 2

The Train is hauled by BSL WAP/M-4

== See also ==
- Vindhyachal Express
