= Salem–Karur Passenger =

Train in India

Salem-Karur Passenger
Overview
- Service type: Passenger Train
- First service: 1 May 2013; 12 years ago
- Current operator: Southern Railway

Route
- Termini: Salem Junction; Karur Junction
- Stops: 8
- Distance travelled: 86 km (53 mi)
- Average journey time: 2 hours
- Service frequency: daily except Sunday
- Train number: 56105 / 56106 / 56107 / 56108

On-board services
- Class: Second class
- Seating arrangements: Yes
- Sleeping arrangements: No
- Catering facilities: No
- Entertainment facilities: No
- Baggage facilities: Yes

Technical
- Track gauge: 1,676 mm (5 ft 6 in)
- Electrification: No
- Operating speed: 80 km/h (50 mph) maximum 39 km/h (24 mph), including halts

Salem–Karur Passenger is a passenger train service in Tamil Nadu, India. It is pulled by a WDP-3A locomotive of Trichy shed.

== Stoppings ==
- Salem
- Mallur
- Rasipuram
- Pudhucahatiram
- Kalangani
- Namakkal
- Laddivadi
- Mohanur
- Vangal
- Karur
