= Howrah–Delhi Janata Express =

Express train belonging to the Indian railways

Howrah Delhi Janata Express
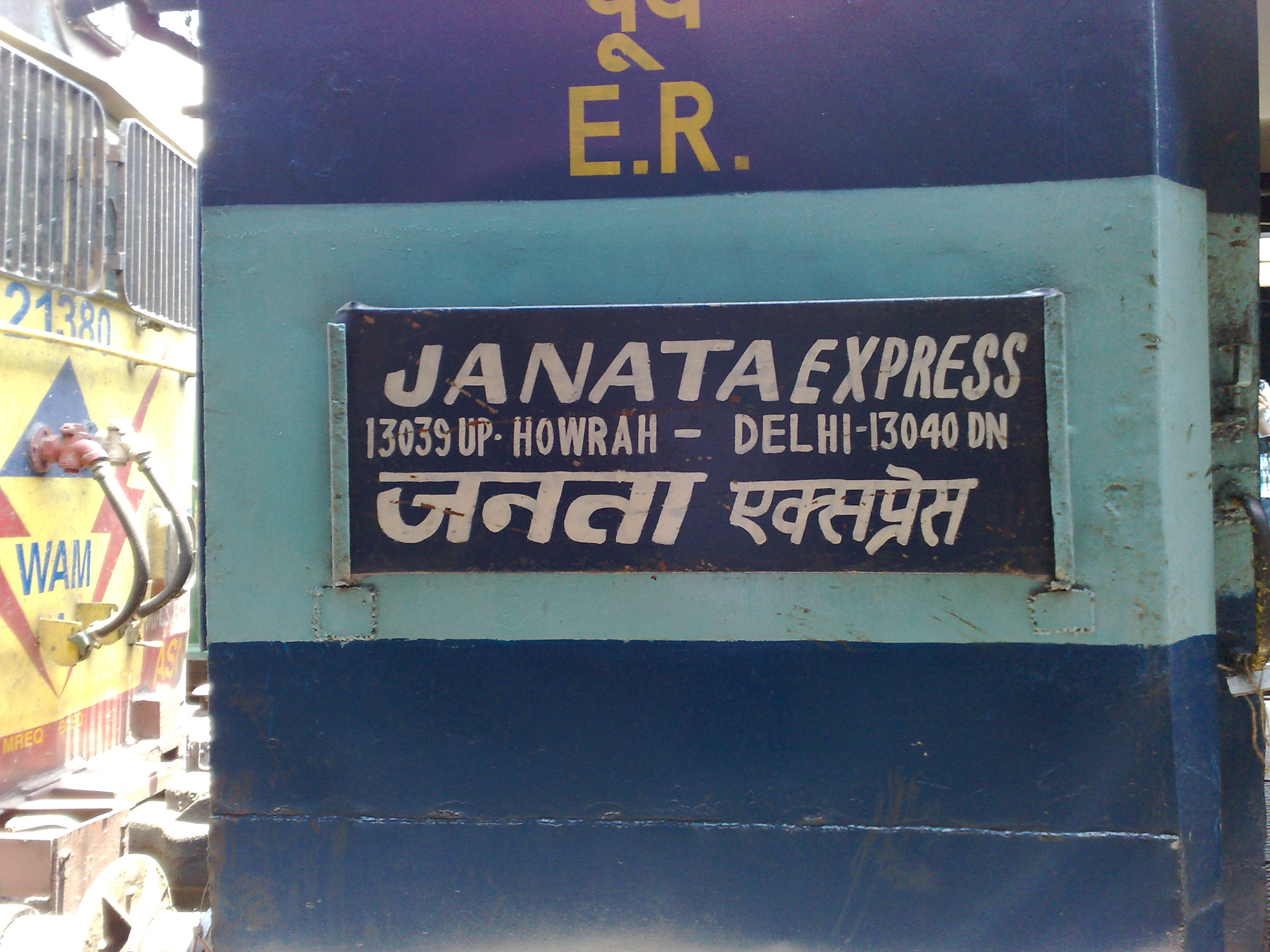

Overview
- Service type: Express
- First service: 1 October 1946; 79 years ago
- Last service: 1 September 2014
- Current operator: Eastern Railways

Route
- Termini: Howrah Junction; Delhi Junction
- Stops: 116 in both directions
- Distance travelled: 1,538 km (956 mi)
- Average journey time: 39 hours 25 minutes as 13039 Howrah–Delhi Janata Express, 38 hours 35 minutes as 13040 Delhi–Howrah Janata Express
- Service frequency: Daily
- Train number: 13039 / 13040

On-board services
- Classes: 2nd Class seating, General Unreserved
- Seating arrangements: Yes
- Sleeping arrangements: No
- Catering facilities: No pantry car attached
- Observation facilities: Carried about 8 High Capacity Parcel Van. Replaced by 13131/32 Kolkata Anand Vihar Express.

Technical
- Rolling stock: Standard Indian Railways coaches
- Track gauge: 1,676 mm (5 ft 6 in)
- Operating speed: 110 km/h (68 mph) maximum 39.44 km/h (25 mph) including halts

The 13039 / 40 Howrah–Delhi Janata Express was an Express train belonging to Indian Railways – Eastern Railway zone that ran between Howrah Junction and Delhi Junction in India.

It operated as train number 13039 from Howrah Junction to Delhi Junction and as train number 13040 in the reverse direction, serving the states of West Bengal, Jharkhand, Bihar, Uttar Pradesh & Delhi.

== Coaches ==
The 13039 / 40 Howrah–Delhi Janata Express had 2 Second Class seating, 7 General Unreserved, 2 SLR (Seating cum Luggage Rake) coaches and up to 8 High Capacity Parcel Vans. It does not carry a pantry car.

As is customary with most train services in India, coach composition may be amended at the discretion of Indian Railways depending on demand.

== Service ==
The 13039 Howrah–Delhi Janata Express covered the distance of 1538 kilometres in 39 hours 25 mins (39.02 km/h) and in 38 hours 35 mins as 13040 Delhi–Howrah Janata Express (39.86 km/h).

As the average speed of the train was below 55 km/h (34 mph), as per Indian Railways rules, its fare does not included a Superfast surcharge.

== Routeing ==
The 13039 / 40 Howrah–Delhi Janata Express ran from Howrah Junction via Bardhaman Junction, Asansol Junction, Mokama Junction, Patna Junction, Pandit Deen Dayal Upadhyaya Junction, Prayagraj Junction, Tundla Junction to Delhi Junction.

== Traction ==
As the route is fully electrified, an Asansol-based WAM-4 or a Howrah-based WAP-4 had powered the train for its entire journey.

== Timings ==
13039 Howrah–Delhi Janata Express leaves Howrah Junction on a daily basis at 20:20 hrs IST and reaches Delhi Junction at 11:45 hrs IST on the 3rd day.

13040 Delhi–Howrah Janata Express leaves Delhi Junction on a daily basis at 15:30 hrs IST and reaches Howrah Junction at 06:05 hrs IST on the 3rd day.
