= Ujjain–Nagda Passenger =

Train in India

Nagda Ujjain Passenger
Overview
- Service type: passenger
- Locale: Madhya Pradesh
- Current operator: Western Railway

Route
- Termini: Nagda Junction; Ujjain Junction
- Distance travelled: 44 km (27 mi)
- Average journey time: 59 m
- Service frequency: Daily
- Train number: 593530UP / 593549DN

On-board services
- Classes: First Class, Sleeper 3 Tier, Unreserved
- Seating arrangements: Yes
- Sleeping arrangements: Yes
- Catering facilities: No

Technical
- Operating speed: 44 km/h (27 mph) average with halts

The Ujjain Nagda Passenger is a passenger train of the Indian Railways, which runs between Ujjain Junction railway station of Ujjain, Holy city of Madhya Pradesh and Nagda Junction railway station of Nagada of Central Indian state Madhya Pradesh.

== Arrival and departure ==
- Train no.593530UP departs from Nagda, daily at 23:25 hrs., reaching Ujjain the same day at 01:00 hrs.
- Train no.593549DN departs from Ujjain daily at 20:40 hrs. from platform no.3 reaching Nagda the next day at 22:15 hrs.

== Route and halts ==
The important halts of the train are :

- Ujjain Junction railway station
- Naikheri railway station
- Aslaoda railway station
- Palsora Makrawa railway station
- Unhel railway station
- Piploda Bagla railway station
- Bhatisuda railway station
- Nagda Junction railway station

== Coach composite ==
The train consists of 18 coaches:

- 1 First Class
- 4 Sleeper coaches
- 10 Unreserved
- 1 Ladies/Handicapped
- 2 Luggage/Brake van

== Average speed and frequency ==
The train runs with an average speed of 44 km/h and covers 44 km in 1 hour and 18 minutes. The train runs on a daily basis.

== Loco link ==
The train is hauled by Ratlam RTM WDM-3 Diesel engine.

== Rake maintenance & sharing ==
The train is maintained by the Ujjain Coaching Depot. The same rake is used for five trains, which are Indore–Chhindwara Panchvalley Express, Indore–Maksi Fast Passenger, Indore–Ujjain Passenger, Bhopal–Indore Passenger and Bhopal–Bina Passenger for one way which is altered by the second rake on the other way.

== See also ==
- Avantika Express
- Indore Junction
- Bhopal Junction
