= Naharlagun–Dekargaon Passenger =

Indian passenger train

Overview
- Service type: Passenger
- Locale: Arunachal Pradesh, Assam
- First service: April 7, 2014; 10 years ago
- Current operator(s): Northeast Frontier Railway

Route
- Termini: Naharlagun; Dekargaon
- Distance travelled: 179 km (111 mi)
- Average journey time: 6 hours
- Service frequency: Daily
- Train number(s): 55614 / 55613

On-board services
- Class(es): Unreserved
- Seating arrangements: Yes

Technical
- Rolling stock: ICF coach
- Operating speed: 32 km/h (20 mph) average with halts

The Naharlagun – Dekargaon Passenger is a Passenger train of the Indian Railways, which runs between Naharlagun near the capital city of Arunachal Pradesh and Dekargaon of Assam state. It was the first train to Arunachal Pradesh of Northeast Frontier Railway. It is currently being operated with 55614/55613 train numbers on a daily basis

== Coaches ==
It consists of ten general second sitting coaches and two guard cum luggage vans. The total composition is 12 coaches.

| Loco | 1 | 2 | 3 | 4 | 5 | 6 | 7 | 8 | 9 | 10 | 11 | 12 |
|---|---|---|---|---|---|---|---|---|---|---|---|---|
| | SLR | UR | UR | UR | UR | UR | UR | UR | UR | UR | UR | SLR |

== Loco ==
It is hauled by WDP-4B diesel loco of Siliguri Loco Shed in both directions.
