= Hyderabad–Nanded Passenger =

Train in India

The Hyderabad–Nanded Passenger is a passenger rail service which operates between the cities of Hyderabad in the Indian state of Telangana and Nanded in the Indian state of Maharashtra. It is operated by the South Central Railway region of the Indian Railways. The service lists under the Secunderabad and Nanded division of the South Central Railway. This is a daily service.

== Train numbers ==
- Hyderabad to Nanded - 17564
- Nanded to Hyderabad - 57564

== Timings ==
- This is a daily service.
- The train travels a distance of 281 km.
- The duration of the journey is 8 hours and 15 minutes.

== Composition ==
HYB-NED Passenger consists of coaches without sleeper berths as no part of the journey both ways is at night. It has a seasonally-determined number of Second Class (II) general unreserved compartments along with reserved Chair Cars (CC) and usually one or two air-conditioned chair cars (ACC).

== Locomotive ==
The entire Nanded division of the South Central Railway has non-electrified track. Hence, a single WDM2A locomotive hauls the train both ways, the locomotive usually belongs to the Guntakal, Maula Ali or Pune sheds.

== Halts ==
The trains halts at 27 intermediate stations or all the stations on the route.

1. HYB—Hyderabad (Source)
2. STPD—Sitafalmandi
3. MJF—Malkajgiri
4. BMO—Bolarum
5. GWV—Gowdavalli
6. MED—Medchal
7. WDR—Wadiaram
8. MZL—Mirzapalli
9. AKE—Akanapet
10. KMC—Kamareddi
11. NZB—Nizamabad
12. BSX—Basar
13. DAB—Dharmabad
14. UMRI—Umri
15. MUE—Mudkhed Junction
16. NED—Nanded (Destination)

== See also ==
- Rail transport in India
- South Central Railway
