= Visakhapatnam–Hazur Sahib Nanded Superfast Express =

Nanded–Visakhapatnam Superfast Express
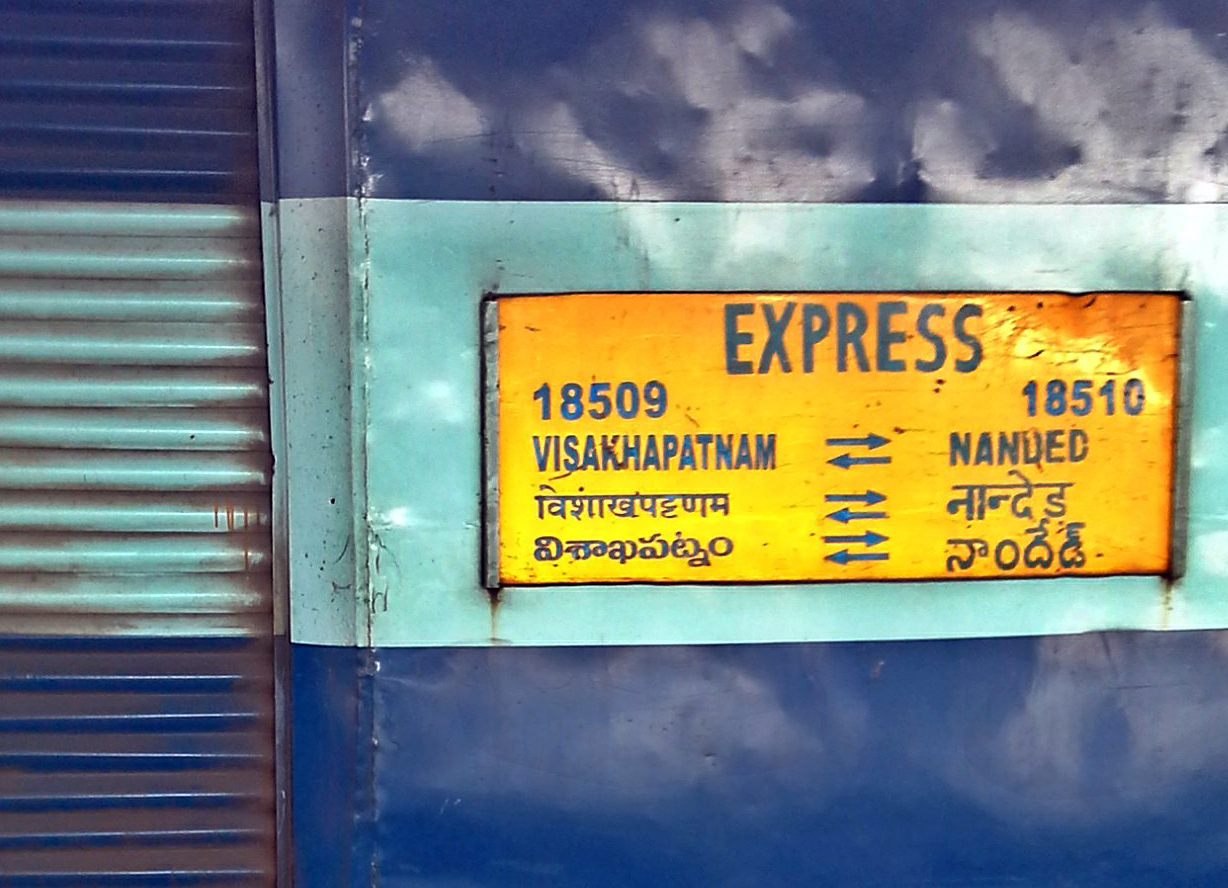

Overview
- Service type: Superfast
- Locale: Andhra Pradesh, Telangana, Maharashtra
- Current operator: South Coast Railway zone

Route
- Termini: Hazur Sahib Nanded; Visakhapatnam
- Stops: 11
- Distance travelled: 861 km (535 mi)
- Average journey time: 17 hrs (approx.)
- Service frequency: Tri-weekly
- Train number: 28011/ 28012

On-board services
- Classes: AC-I, AC-II, AC-III, Sleeper Class, Unreserved
- Seating arrangements: Yes
- Sleeping arrangements: Yes

Technical
- Track gauge: 1,676 mm (5 ft 6 in)
- Operating speed: 56 km/h (35 mph)
Route map
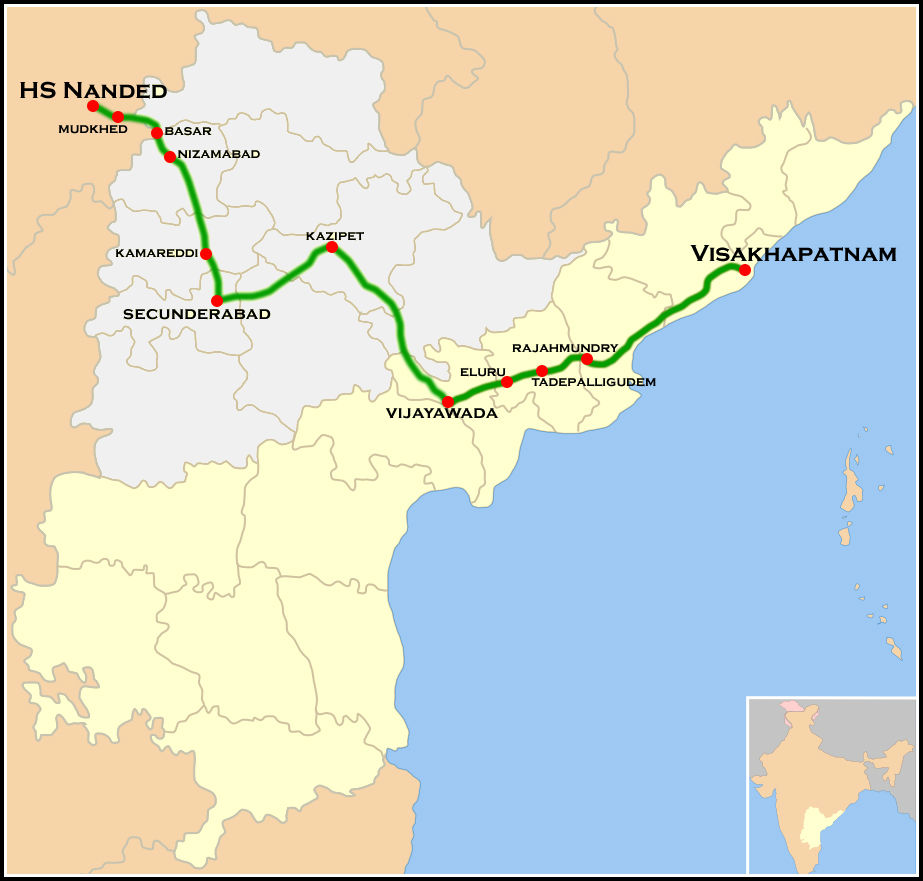

The Nanded–Visakhapatnam Express (previously Nizamabad–Visakhapatnam Express) is an Express Train service connecting the cities of Nanded, Maharashtra and Visakhapatnam in the Indian state of Andhra Pradesh. It is operated by the South Coast Railway zone of the Indian Railways. This is a non-daily service which runs on Tuesdays, Wednesdays and Saturdays. The train number 20811 runs from Visakhapatnam to Nanded and the train 20812 runs from Nanded to Visakhapatnam on Sundays, Wednesdays and Thursdays.

== Composition ==
NED–VSKP Express consists of 23 coaches with 1 locomotive

- 1 x AC II coach
- 3 x AC III coach
- 10 x III tier Sleeper
- 6 x General/Unreserved
- 2 x SLR
- 1 x Pantry Car

The coaches are commissioned from the VSKP coaching depot.

This train also shares the rake with Hirakud Express.

== Stoppage ==
This train stops at Mudkhed Jn, Basar, Nizamabad Jn, Kamareddi, Secunderabad Jn, Kazipet Jn, Rayanapadu, Eluru, Tadepalligudem, Rajahmundry and Duvvada.

== Locomotive ==
The train is hauled between Nanded and Visakhapatnam by a single WAP-7 locomotive of Lallaguda shed or WAP-4 of Vijayawada shed.

== See also ==
- Rail transport in India
- South Central Railway zone
- Andhra Pradesh Sampark Kranti Express
