= Intercity Express (Indian Railways) =

Express-train service in India

- Main Operation: Connects important cities of India
- Other Operation: Launched in 1906
- Fleet: 202
- Parent company: Indian Railways

The Intercity Express is an express-train service in India which connects major railway junctions and state capitals. These act as long-distance reserved and unreserved suburban trains with sitting accommodation (AC Chair Car - CC, AC Executive Chair Car EC, Anubhati class K, Vistadome EA and Non-Ac Second Sitting - 2S). These are quite fast and maintain a high average speed for short distances along with priority over other trains.

== History ==
The first named intercity train (Flying Ranee) was introduced in 1906 for providing connections between two cities from one state to other various states in India. The train left Surat station for Mumbai Central station to cover a distance of 264 km in 5 hrs 28 min and ran weekly from 1906 to 1939 when it was discontinued due to World War II. Since then, it has been discontinued and restarted several times. It finally resumed operations on 1 November 1950 and has been running ever since.

The Mumbai CSMT–Pune Deccan Queen Express, the second named intercity train in India, was introduced on 15 February 1930.

On 1 July 1992, the first intercity express was introduced between Indore and New Delhi which is the only overnight intercity train runs between two major cities of India.

On 1 July 1997, the second intercity express train launched between Chennai–Coimbatore & Bengaluru–Hubbali which was the first one-day trip daily intercity express train.

== Features ==
The trains are less expensive than other express trains and usually reach their destinations within 5–6 hours. They usually complete a round trip in a day, returning to the origin station at night and using only a single rake. Generally, they have only sitting accommodations and a pantry car. Intercity-Express trains run daily, except:

- Jabalpur–Ambikapur Intercity Express, runs daily
- Bhopal–Gwalior Intercity Express, five days a week
- Indore–New Delhi Intercity Express, which takes 11 hours to cover the 550 kilometres (340 mi) route. This train uses two rakes and also has unreserved, sleeper service and three coach classes
- Bengaluru–Ernakulam intercity express also uses 2 rakes
- Mangaluru–Coimbatore Intercity Express uses 2 rakes and which is shared with Ernad Express
- Haldibari–Kolkata Intercity Express runs tri-weekly covering 630 km in 11 hours 10 minutes. It has Chair Car & AC Chair Car Coaches. The train is Superfast in nature.
- Katihar–Patna Intercity Express runs except Sunday.

== Named Intercity trains ==
The following trains are intercity-express trains, but have different names:

Sr no.	Train number	Train name	Route	km	Avg speed (km/h)
1	12279 / 12280	Taj Express	Jhansi–New Delhi	411	58
2	11901 / 11902	Gita Jayanti Express	Mathura–Kurukshetra	299	42
3	12465 / 12466	Ranthambore Express	Indore–Jodhpur	910	56
4	12871 / 12872	Ispat Express	Howrah–Titlagarh	745	56
5	12821 / 12822	Dhauli Express	Howrah–Puri	500	60
6	12757 / 12758	Kaghaznagar Express	Secunderabad–Sirpur Kaghaznagar	297	56
7	19033 / 19044	Gujarat Queen Express	Ahmedabad–Valsad	298	47
8	22953 / 22954	Gujarat Superfast Express	Ahmedabad–Mumbai Central	492	55
9	12933 / 12934	Karnavati Express	Ahmedabad–Mumbai Central	492	63
10	12921 / 12922	Flying Ranee Express	Mumbai Central–Surat	263	56
11	12915 / 12916	Ashram Express	Ahmedabad–Delhi	933	58
12	13017 / 13018	Ganadevata Express	Howrah–Azimganj	279	47
13	13113 / 13114	Hazarduari Express	Kolkata–Lalgola	225	50
14	12337 / 12338	Shantiniketan Express	Howrah–Bolpur	146	65
15	13161 / 13162	Tebhaga Express	Kolkata–Balurghat	441	46
16	13103 / 13104	Bhagirathi Express	Sealdah–Lalgola	228	50
17	12497 / 12498	Shan-e-Punjab Express	New Delhi–Amritsar	448	58
17	22105 / 22106	Indrayani Express	Mumbai CSMT–Pune	192	55
19	11007 / 11008	Deccan Express	Mumbai CSMT–Pune	192	46
20	11029 / 11030	Koyna Express	Mumbai CSMT–Kolhapur SCSMT	516	44
21	11009 / 11010	Sinhagad Express	Mumbai CSMT–Pune	192	45
22	12125 / 12126	Pragati Express	Mumbai CSMT–Pune	186	54
23	12123 / 12134	Deccan Queen Express	Mumbai CSMT–Pune	192	58
24	16215 / 16216	Chamundi Express	Mysuru–Bengaluru City	138	50
25	12607 / 12608	Lal Bagh Express	Chennai Central–Bengaluru City	359	60
26	16089 / 16090	Yelagiri Express	Chennai Central–Jolarpettai	214	48
27	16023 / 16024	Malgudi Express	Mysuru–Yesvantpur	143	45
28	12613 / 12614	Wodeyar Express	Mysuru–Bengaluru City	138	55
29	12639 / 12640	Brindavan Express	Chennai Central–Bengaluru City	358	58
30	16057 / 16058	Sapthagiri Express	Chennai Central–Tirupati	146	45
31	12605 / 12606	Pallavan Superfast Express	Chennai Egmore–Karaikkudi	426	64
32	17407 / 17408	Pamani Express	Tirupati–Mannargudi	464	43
33	14227 / 14228	Varuna (Shuttle) Express	Varanasi–Lucknow Charbagh	283	56
34	14215 / 14216	Ganga Gomti Express	Prayagraj Sangam–Lucknow	201	48
35	10103 / 10104	Mandovi Express	Mumbai CSMT–Madgaon	750	50
36	14795 / 14796	Ekta Express	Bhiwani–Kalka	330	45
37	17239 / 17240	Simhadri Express	Guntur–Vishakhapatnam	382	37
38	12747 / 12748	Palnadu Express	Guntur–Vikarabad	353	55
39	12341 / 12342	Agniveena Express	Howrah–Asansol	200	62
40	12339 / 12340	Coalfield Express	Howrah–Dhanbad	260	60
41	22387 / 22388	Black Diamond Express	Howrah–Dhanbad	272	55
42	14519 / 14520	Kisan Express	Delhi–Bathinda	341	45
43	14633 / 14634	Ravi Express	Amritsar–Pathankot	107	43
44	17023 / 17024	Tungabhadra Express	Secunderabad–Kurnool City	244	49
45	17027 / 17028	Hundry Express	Secunderabad–Kurnool City	244	52
46	17687 / 17688	Marathwada Express	Manmad–Dharmabad	421	46
47	17617 / 17618	Tapovan Express	Mumbai CSMT–HS Nanded	606	52
48	12109 / 12110	Panchvati Express	Mumbai CSMT–Manmad	257	56
49	13233 / 13234	Rajgriha Express	Rajgir–Danapur	108	28
50	12805 / 12806	Janmabhoomi Express	Visakhapatnam–Secunderabad	689	55
51	12711 / 12712	Pinakini Express	Vijayawada–Chennai Central	430	61
52	12713 / 12714	Satavahana Express	Vijayawada–Secunderabad	349	63
53	17201 / 17202	Golconda Express	Guntur–Secunderabad	380	49
54	14629 / 14630	Sutlej Express	Chandigarh–Firozpur	235	43
55	14231 / 14232	Manwar Sangam Express	Prayagraj Sangam–Basti	260	37
56	16301 / 16302	Venad Express	Shoranur–Thiruvananthapuram	327	40
57	16649 / 16650	Parasuram Express	Mangaluru Central–Nagercoil	702	45
58	16303 / 16304	Vanchinad Express	Ernakulam Jn–Thiruvananthapuram Central	220	45
59	16605 / 16606	Ernad Express	Mangaluru Central–Thiruvananthapuram	691	43
60	12675 / 12676	Kovai Express	Chennai Central–Coimbatore	496	65
61	16791 / 16792	Palaruvi Express	Tirunelveli Jn–Palakkad	477	33
62	12883 / 12884	Rupashi Bangla Express	Kolkata Santragachi–Purulia	315	56
63	13301 / 13302	Swarna Rekha Express	Dhanbad–Tatanagar	188	32
64	12885 / 12886	Aranyak Express	Kolkata Shalimar–Bhojudih	322	61
65	12813 / 12814	Steel Express	Howrah–Tatanagar	250	63
66	12857 / 12858	Tamralipta Express	Howrah–Digha	185	56
67	22897 / 22898	Kandari Express	Howrah–Digha	185	55
68	13205 / 13206	Janhit Express	Saharsa–Danapur	224	30
69	22321 / 22322	Hool Express	Howrah–Siuri	242	56
70	12717 / 12718	Ratnachal Express	Vijayawada–Visakhapatnam	349	61
71	18801 / 18802	Hasdeo Express LHB	Korba–Raipur	200	51
72	18803 / 18804	Hasdeo Express ICF	Korba–Raipur	200	51
73	12635 / 12636	Vaigai Superfast Express	Chennai Egmore–Madurai	497	68
74	13187/13188	Maa Tara Express	Sealdah-Rampurhat	226	50
75	12347/12348	Sahid SF Express	Howrah-Rampurhat	207	58

== Normal Intercity Express trains ==
Intercity Express routes are (round-trip, unless noted):

Sr no	Train number	Route	km	Avg speed (km/h)
1	14211 / 14212	Agra Cantt–New Delhi	195	45
2	12195 / 12196	Agra Fort–Ajmer	375	56
3	19119 / 19120	Ahmedabad–Somnath	437	47
4	15771 / 15772	Alipurduar–Kamakhya	298	42
5	15769 / 15770	Alipurduar–Mariani	446	42
6	14525 / 14526	Ambala Cantt–Shri Ganganagar	328	49
7	12119 / 12120	Amravati–Ajni (Nagpur)	178	65
8	15463 / 15464	Balurghat–Siliguri	323	48
9	12935 / 12936	Bandra T (Mumbai)–Surat	252	58
10	16377 / 16378	Bangalore City - Ernakulam	587	55
11	16201 / 16202	Bangalore City - Talaguppa	371	52
12	22617 / 22618	SMVT Bangalore –Tirupati	334	56
13	13401 / 13402	Bhagalpur–Danapur	231	33
14	12197 / 12198	Bhopal–Gwalior	485	55
15	19323 / 19324	Bhopal–Indore	231	50
16	22819 / 22820	Bhubaneshwar–Visakhapatnam	444	61
17	17009 / 17010	Bidar–Hyderabad	163	46
18	22471 / 22472	Bikaner–Delhi Sarai Rohilla	458	58
19	12855 / 12856	Bilaspur–Itwari Jn	408	58
20	12411 / 12422	Chandigarh–Amritsar	248	55
21	12679 / 12680	Chennai–Coimbatore	494	64
22	15105 / 15106	Chhapra–Nautanwa	260	35
23	15111 / 15112	Chhapra–Varanasi City	225	46
24	14109 / 14110	Chitrakootdham (Karwi)–Kanpur	213	41
25	14521 / 14522	Delhi–Ambala Cantt	263	47
26	14731 / 14732	Delhi–Fazilka	522	49
27	12481 / 12482	Delhi–Sri Ganganagar	423	56
28	14625 / 14626	Delhi Sarai Rohilla–Firozpur	381	51
29	13319 / 13320	Deoghar–Ranchi	333	41
30	13305 / 13306	Dhanbad–Gaya	199	51
31	13331 / 13332	Dhanbad–Patna	369	36
32	13303 / 13304	Dhanbad–Ranchi	166	39
33	16305 / 16306	Ernakulam–Kannur	282	49
34	15069 / 15070	Gorakhpur–Aishbagh	335	55
35	15031 / 15032	Gorakhpur–Lucknow	277	55
36	15103 / 15104	Gorakhpur–Manduadih	234	41
37	12705 / 12706	Guntur–Secunderabad	380	56
38	16341 / 16342	Guruvayur–Thiruvananthapuram	303	47
39	15617 / 15618	Guwahati–Naharlagun	332	34
40	15717 / 15718	Alipurduar–Mariani	404	35
41	22187 / 22188	Adhartal (Jabalpur)–Habibganj (Bhopal)	331	54
42	14711 / 14712	Haridwar–Shri Ganganagar	485	49
43	13011 / 13012	Howrah–Malda Town (Via Rampurhat)	343	46
44	22891 / 22892	Howrah–Ranchi	463	56
45	13053 / 13054	Howrah - Radhikapur (Via Rampurhat)	481	43
46	17011 / 17012	Hyderabad–Sirpur Kaghaznagar	306	50
47	12415 / 12416	Indore–New Delhi	826	61
48	11265 / 11266	Madan Mahal–Ambikapur	436	47
49	22189 / 22190	Madan Mahal–Rewa	242	55
50	11651 / 11652	Madan Mahal–Singrauli	355	47
51	19717 / 19178	Gandhinagar–Daulatpur Chowk	756	45
52	15283 / 15284	Manihari–Jaynagar	396	32
53	15549 / 15550	Jaynagar–Patna	244	32
54	13225 / 13226	Jaynagar–Rajendranagar Terminal	263	28
55	11109 / 11110	Jhansi–Lucknow	292	49
56	22477 / 22478	Jodhpur–Jaipur	310	64
57	17639 / 17640	Kacheguda–Akola	515	45
58	17641 / 17642	Kacheguda–Narkher	732	46
59	15815 / 15816	Kamakhya–Dekargaon	183	38
60	15603 / 15604	Guwahati–Ledo	571	40
61	15613 / 15614	Kamakhya–Murkongselek	490	44
62	22441 / 22442	Chitrakootdham (Karwi)–Kanpur (via Allahabad)	325	57
63	15713 / 15714	Katihar–Patna	290	42–
64	15719 / 15720	Katihar–Siliguri	203	39
65	15701 / 15702	Katihar–Siliguri	234	44
66	12363 / 12364	Kolkata–Haldibari	627	56
67	15059 / 15060	Lalkuan–Anand Vihar Terminal (Delhi)	262	40
68	12179 / 12180	Lucknow–Agra Fort	325	54
69	14209 / 14210	Prayagraj Sangam–Lucknow	197	48
70	13409 / 13410	Malda Town–Jamalpur	235	43
71	22609 / 22610	Mangaluru Central–Coimbatore	407	56
72	12127 / 12128	Mumbai CSMT–Pune	190	58
73	12459 / 12460	New Delhi–Amritsar	448	55
74	14315 / 14316	Bareilly–New Delhi	256	45
75	14681 / 14682	New Delhi–Jalandhar	438	50
76	14323 / 14324	New Delhi–Rohtak	71	30
77	18413 / 18414	Paradeep–Puri	173	38
78	12529 / 12530	Patliputra–Lucknow	520	48
79	25201 / 25202	Patliputra–Narkatiaganj	235	34
80	13249 / 13250	Patna–Bhabua Road	194	38
81	13243 / 13244	Patna–Bhabua Road (via Gaya)	243	42
82	14123 / 14124	Pratapgarh–Kanpur	245	48
83	12169 / 12170	Pune–Solapur	262	66
84	11701 / 11702	Raipur-Jabalpur	408	51
85	12527 / 12528	Ramnagar–Chandigarh	396	50
86	18619 / 18620	Ranchi–Dumka	411	42
87	22839 / 22840	Rourkela–Bhubaneswar	419	57
88	23225 / 23226	Saharsa–Rajendranagar Terminal	214	32
89	13235 / 13236	Sahibganj–Danapur	305	33
90	18303 / 18304	Sambalpur–Puri	342	52
91	18301 / 18302	Sambalpur–Rayagada	323	49
92	12383 / 12384	Sealdah–Asansol	220	56
93	12725 / 12726	Bangalore City–Hubballi	470	57
94	14811 / 14812	Sikar–Delhi Sarai Rohilla	291	44
95	15767 / 15768	Siliguri–Alipurduar	161	34
96	15765 / 15766	Siliguri–Dhubri	261	40
97	18007 / 18008	Kolkata Shalimar–Bhanjpur	266	50
98	22959 / 22960	Vadodara–Jamnagar	560	55
99	16205 / 16206	Talguppa–Mysore	373	48
100	22627 / 22628	Tiruchirappalli - Thiruvananthapuram	457	55
101	22615 / 22616	Tirupati–Coimbatore	470	60
102	12991 / 12992	Udaipur City–Jaipur	435	58
103	19035 / 19036	Vadodara–Ahmedabad	99	44
104	19011 / 19012	Valsad–Dahod	346	59
105	12929 / 12930	Valsad– Vadodara	198	56
106	14213 / 14214	Varanasi–Nepalganj Road	370	42
107	14203 / 14204	Varanasi–Lucknow	301	52
108	14219 / 14220	Varanasi–Lucknow (via Pratapgarh)	301	48
109	23345 / 23346	Varanasi–Shaktinagar Terminal	229	29
110	13345 / 13346	Varanasi–Singrauli	210	32
111	12795 / 12796	Vijayawada–Hyderabad	336	58
112	18511 / 18512	Koraput–Visakhapatnam	359	51
113	22679 / 22680	Yesvantpur–Hassan	174	55
114	16579 / 16580	Yesvantpur–Shivamogga Town	268	47
115	12893 / 12894	Bhubaneswar–Bolangir	397	55
116	19151 / 19152	Palanpur–Bhuj	359	46
117	14101 / 14102	Prayagraj Sangam–Kanpur Central	212	45
118	13465 / 13466	Howrah–Malda Town (via Azimganj)	332	48
119	13241 / 13242	Banka–Rajendranagar Terminal (Patna)	272	35
120	19203 / 19204	Sabarmati–Bhavangar	310	50
121	14819 / 14820	BGKT (Jodhpur)–Sabarmati (Ahmedbabad)	454	49
122	11125 / 11126	Ratlam–Gwalior	680	46
123	20959 / 20960	Valsad–Vadnagar	424	58
124	15777 / 15778	New Jalpaiguri–Alipurduar	168	29
125	11701 / 11702	Jabalpur - Raipur	168	53
126	13427/13428	Howrah-Sahibganj	351	51
127	15675/15676	Guwahati-New Jalpaiguri Express	407	48
128	16807/16808	Tambaram (Chennai) -Tiruchirappalli Express	377	53

== Traction ==
some of the Intercity Express trains were hauled by diesel locomotives WDM-3D , WDM-3A or WDP-4/4D/4B. As all the routes fully electrified they all carried by a WAP-7 , WAP-4 , WCAM-3 , WAG-7 and WAP-5 electric locomotives from different electric loco sheds

== Incidents ==
On 13 Feb 2015 Anekal derailment, at least 9 passengers were dead and over 100 passengers were injured when the Bangalore City–Ernakulam Intercity Express derailed between Anekal Road and Hosur on Bangalore City–Salem section which lies between the border of Karnataka and Tamil Nadu State, In suspected some technical issue in the engine. The train was heading towards Ernakulam.

On 30 January 2016, Ratnachal Express (12717) from Vishakhapatnam to Vijayawada was burnt in protest of reservation for Kapu community leaving no one injured according to the railway sources.

== See also ==
- Duronto Express
- List of named passenger trains in India
- Rajdhani Express
- Shatabdi Express
- Express trains in India
- Rajya Rani Express
