= Benti =

Benti may refer to:

== People ==
- Galeazzo Benti (1923–1993), Italian actor
- Joseph Benti, American former television presenter
- Ketema Benti (born 1945), Ethiopian former sprinter
- Tafari Benti (1921–1977), Ethiopian military officer and politician

== Places ==
- Benti, Uttar Pradesh, India, a village
