= Jaipur–Daulatpur Chowk Intercity Express =

Train in India

Overview
- Service type: Intercity
- First service: 15 September 2014; 11 years ago
- Current operator: North Western Railway zone

Route
- Termini: Jaipur Junction (JP); Daulatpur Chowk (DLPC)
- Stops: 14
- Distance travelled: 754 km (469 mi)
- Average journey time: 16h 40m
- Service frequency: Daily (Note: Runs three days in a week for every direction.)
- Train number: 19717/19718

On-board services
- Classes: AC 2 tier, AC 3 tier, Sleeper class, General Unreserved
- Seating arrangements: No
- Sleeping arrangements: Yes
- Catering facilities: On-board catering E-catering
- Observation facilities: ICF coach
- Entertainment facilities: No
- Baggage facilities: No
- Other facilities: Below the seats

Technical
- Rolling stock: 2
- Track gauge: 1,676 mm (5 ft 6 in)
- Operating speed: 47 km/h (29 mph), including halts

The Jaipur–Daulatpur Chowk Intercity Express is an Intercity train belonging to North Wetrern with 19411/19412 train no on daily basis. Railway zone that runs between Jaipur Junction and Daulatpur Chowk in India. It is currently being operated with 19717/19718 train numbers on a daily basis.

This train also known as Ahir-Jat Express in Haryana.

Till 8 March 2020, This train was running up to Chandigarh and thereafter the destination station changed to Daulatpur Chowk for direct connectivity to another tourist spots in Himachal Pradesh.Till 4 April 2022, This train was running up to Jaipur and thereafter the destination station changed to Sabarmati BG for direct connectivity with merger of train no 19411/12 Sabarmati BG-Ajmer Intercity Express with additional two stoppage Kishangarh, Phulera.

== Service ==
The 19717/Jaipur–Daulatpur Chowk Intercity Express has an average speed of 47 km/h and covers 571 km in 12h 15m. The 19718/Daulatpur Chowk–Jaipur Intercity Express has an average speed of 47 km/h and covers 571 km in 12h 15m.

== Route and halts ==
The important halts of the train are:

- Jaipur Junction
- Gandhinagar Jaipur
- Dausa
- Bandikui Junction
- Alwar Junction
- Rewari Junction
- Jhajjar
- Rohtak Junction
- Jind Junction
- Narwana Junction
- Kaithal
- Kurukshetra Junction
- Ambala Cantonment Junction
- Chandigarh Junction
- Anandpur Sahib
- Nangal Dam
- Una Himachal
- Amb Anduara
- Daulatpur Chowk

== Coach composition ==
The train has standard ICF rakes with a maximum speed of 110 km/h. The train consists of 14 coaches:

- 1 AC II Tier
- 3 AC III Tier
- 4 Sleeper coaches
- 4 General Unreserved
- 2 Seating cum Luggage Rake

== Traction ==
Both trains are hauled by an Abu Road Loco Shed based WDM-2 diesel locomotive from Jaipur to Chandigarh and vice versa.

== Direction reversal ==
The train reverses its direction once:

- Kurukshetra Junction

== See also ==
- Jaipur Junction railway station
- Chandigarh Junction railway station
