= Kaghaznagar Express =

Train in India

Kaghaznagar Superfast Express
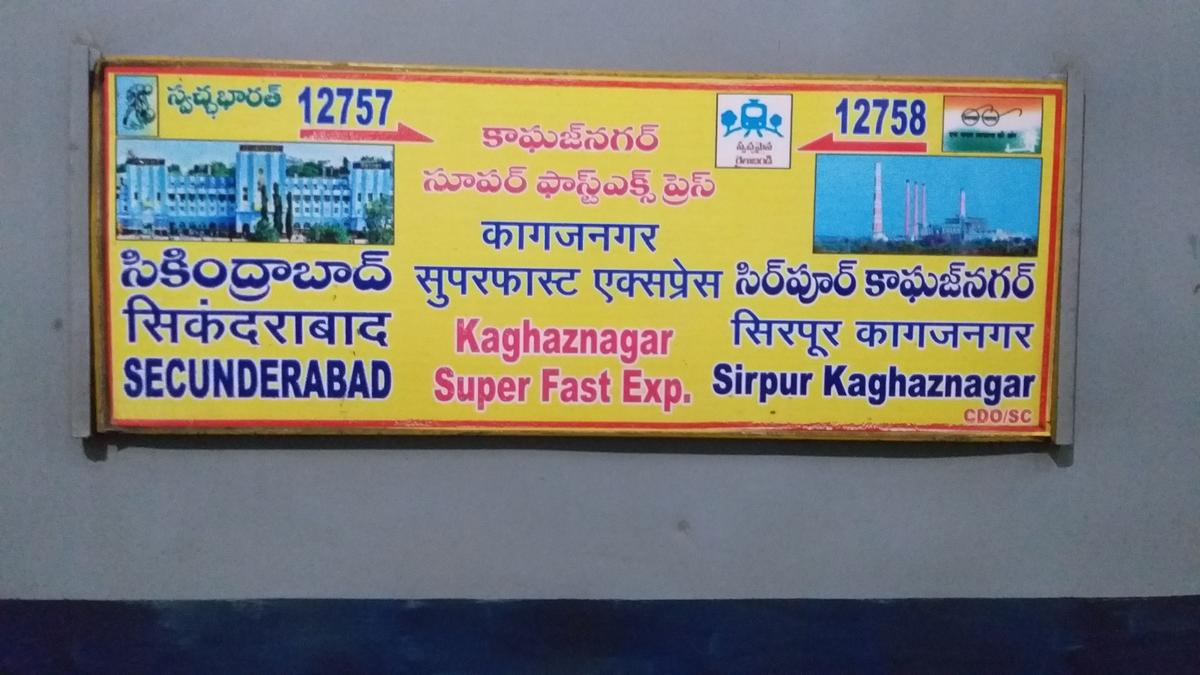

Overview
- Service type: Superfast
- First service: 1 May 1989; 36 years ago
- Current operator: South Central Railway

Route
- Termini: Secunderabad Junction (SC); Sirpur Kaghaznagar (SKZR)
- Stops: 14
- Distance travelled: 297 km (185 mi)
- Average journey time: 5 hours 20 minutes
- Service frequency: Daily
- Train number: 12757 / 12758

On-board services
- Classes: AC Chair Car, Second Class Seating, General Unreserved
- Seating arrangements: Yes
- Sleeping arrangements: No
- Auto-rack arrangements: Overhead racks
- Catering facilities: On-board catering
- Observation facilities: Large windows
- Baggage facilities: No
- Other facilities: Below the seats

Technical
- Rolling stock: LHB coach
- Track gauge: 1,676 mm (5 ft 6 in)
- Operating speed: 57 km/h (35 mph) average including halts.
Route map
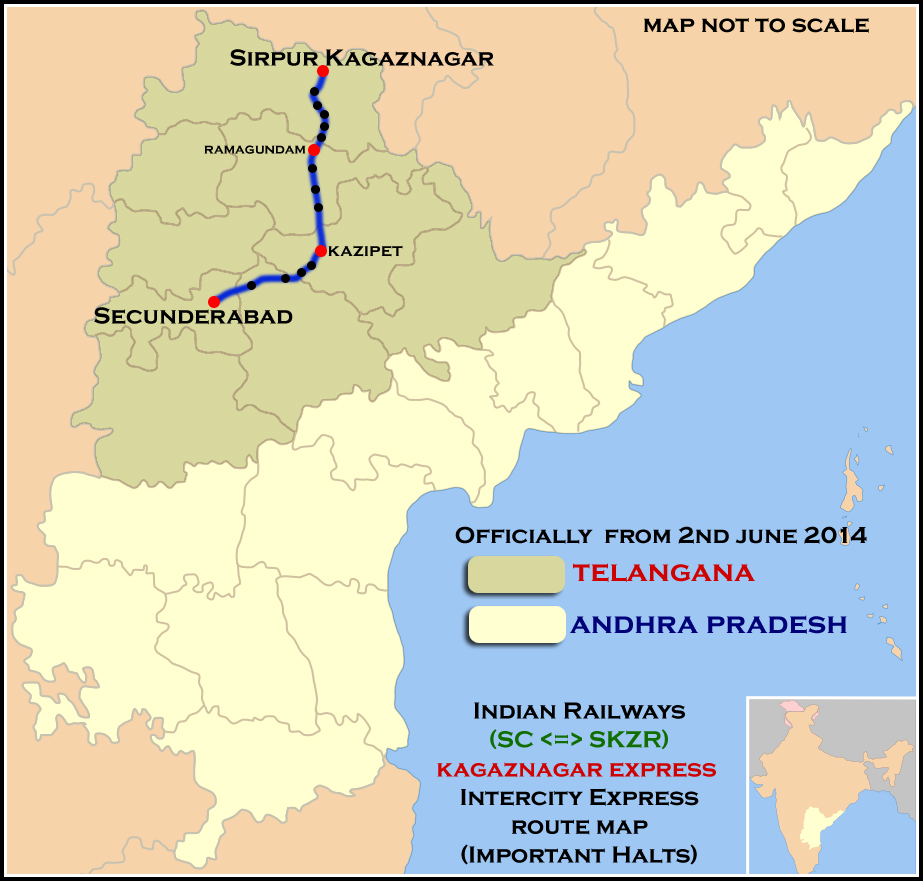

The 12757 / 12758 Kaghaznagar Superfast Express is a Superfast Express train belonging to Indian Railways – South Central Railway zone that runs between Secunderabad Junction & Sirpur Kaghaznagar in India.

It operates as train number 12757 from Secunderabad Junction to Sirpur Kaghaznagar and as train number 12758 in the reverse direction, serving the state of Telangana.

== Coaches ==
The Kaghaznagar Express has 1 AC Chair Car, 2 Second Sitting Chair Cars, 17 General Class & 2 SLR (Seating cum Luggage Rake) coaches. It does not carry a pantry car.

As is customary with most train services in India, coach composition may be amended at the discretion of Indian Railways depending on demand.

== Service ==
The train covers the distance of 297 km (185 mi) in 5 hours 10min in both directions. (57.5 km/h (35.7 mph)).

As the average speed of the train is above55 km/h (34 mph), as per Indian Railway rules, its fare includes a Superfast surcharge.

== Routing ==
The express runs from Secunderabad Junction via Bhongir, Kazipet Junction, Uppal, Jammikunta, Odela, Peddapalli, Ramagundam, Mancherial, Bellampalli to Sirpur Kaghaznagar.

== Traction ==
As the route is fully electrified, a Lallaguda Loco Shed-based WAP-7 electric locomotive powers the train for its entire journey.

== Timings ==
The schedule is given below:-

KAGHAZNAGAR EXPRESS
12757		Stations	12758	
Arrival	Departure	Stations	Arrival	Departure
----	08:20	Secunderabad Junction	20:15	----
08:55	08:56	Bhongir	18:36	18:37
09:04	09:05	Alair	18:03	18:04
09:19	09:20	Jangaon	17:47	17:48
09:34	09:35	Ghanpur	17:25	17:26
10:08	10:10	Kazipet Junction	17:04	17:05
10:34	10:35	Uppal	16:39	16:41
10:43	10:45	Jammikunta	16:30	16:32
11:14	11:15	Odela	16:13	16:15
11:29	11:30	Peddapalli Junction	16:00	16:02
11:47	11:48	Ramagundam	15:42	15:44
12:04	12:05	Mancherial	15:32	15:34
12:13	12:14	Ravindrakhani	15:26	15:28
12:29	12:30	Bellampalli	15:18	15:20
13:40	----	Sirpur Kaghaznagar	----	14:50

== Gallery ==
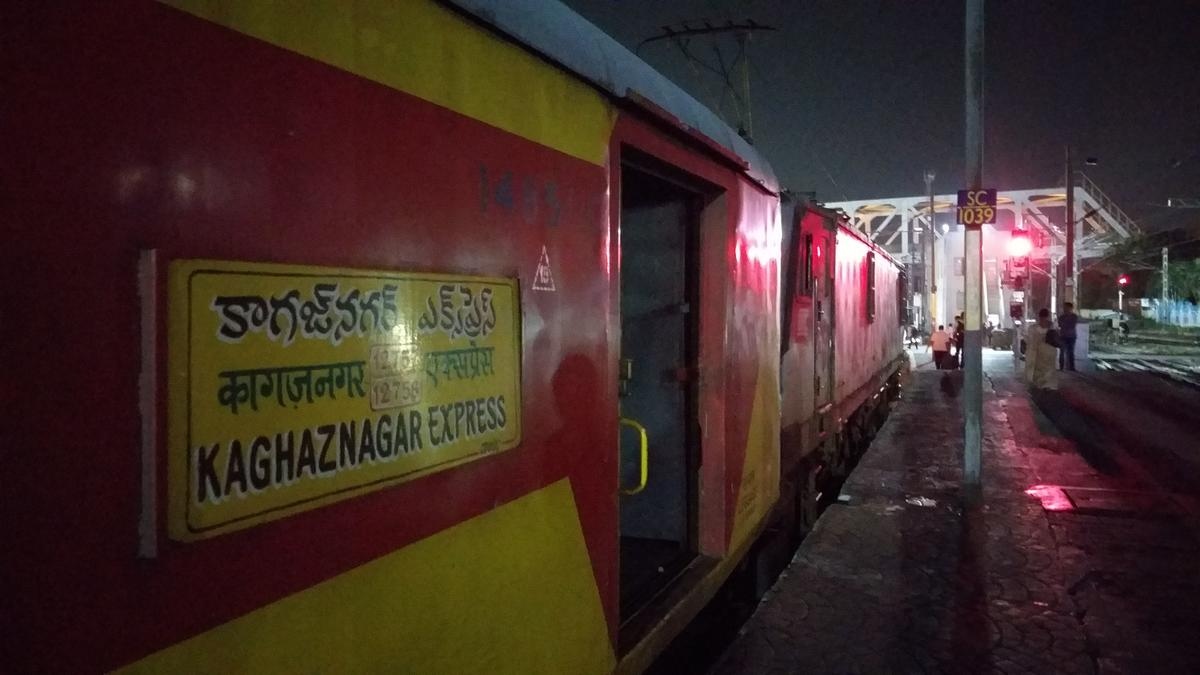
At Secunderabad Junction

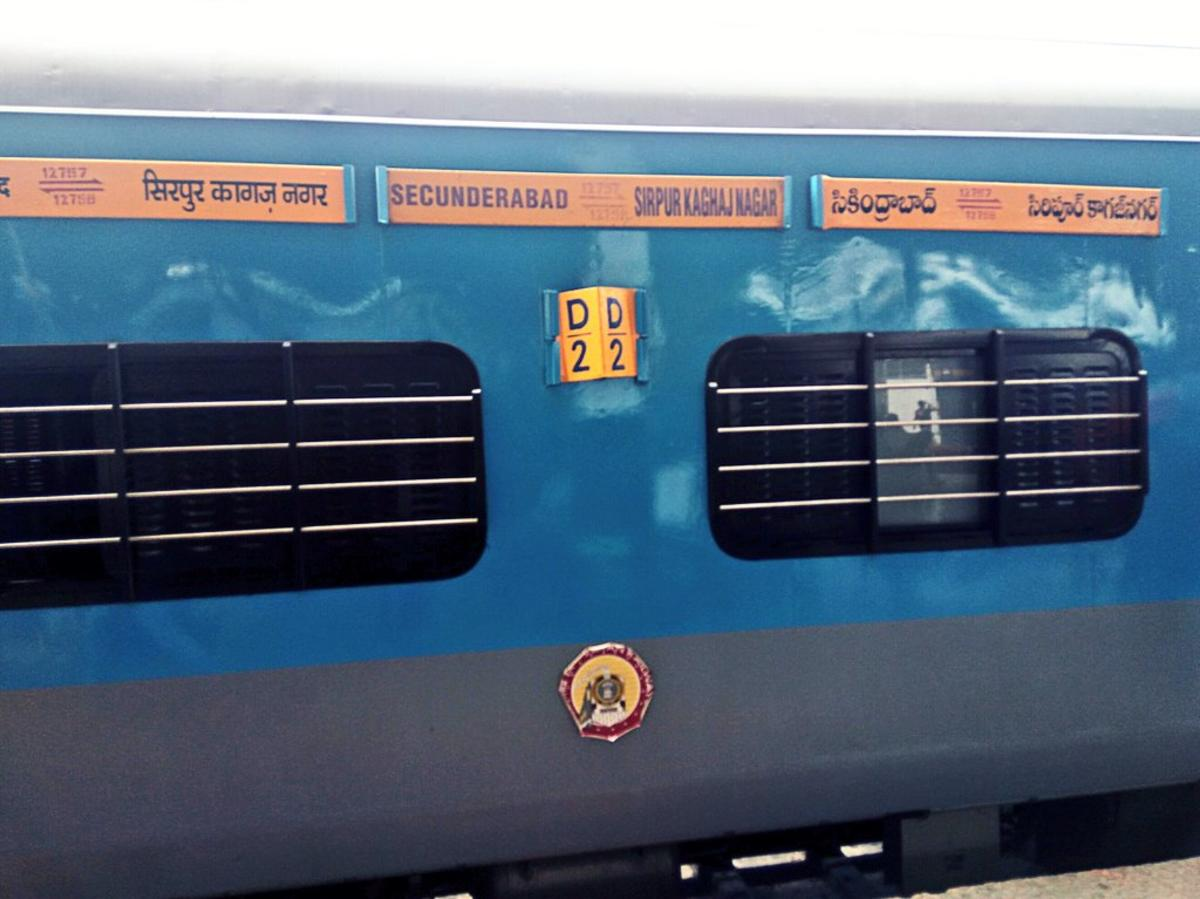
D2 Coach

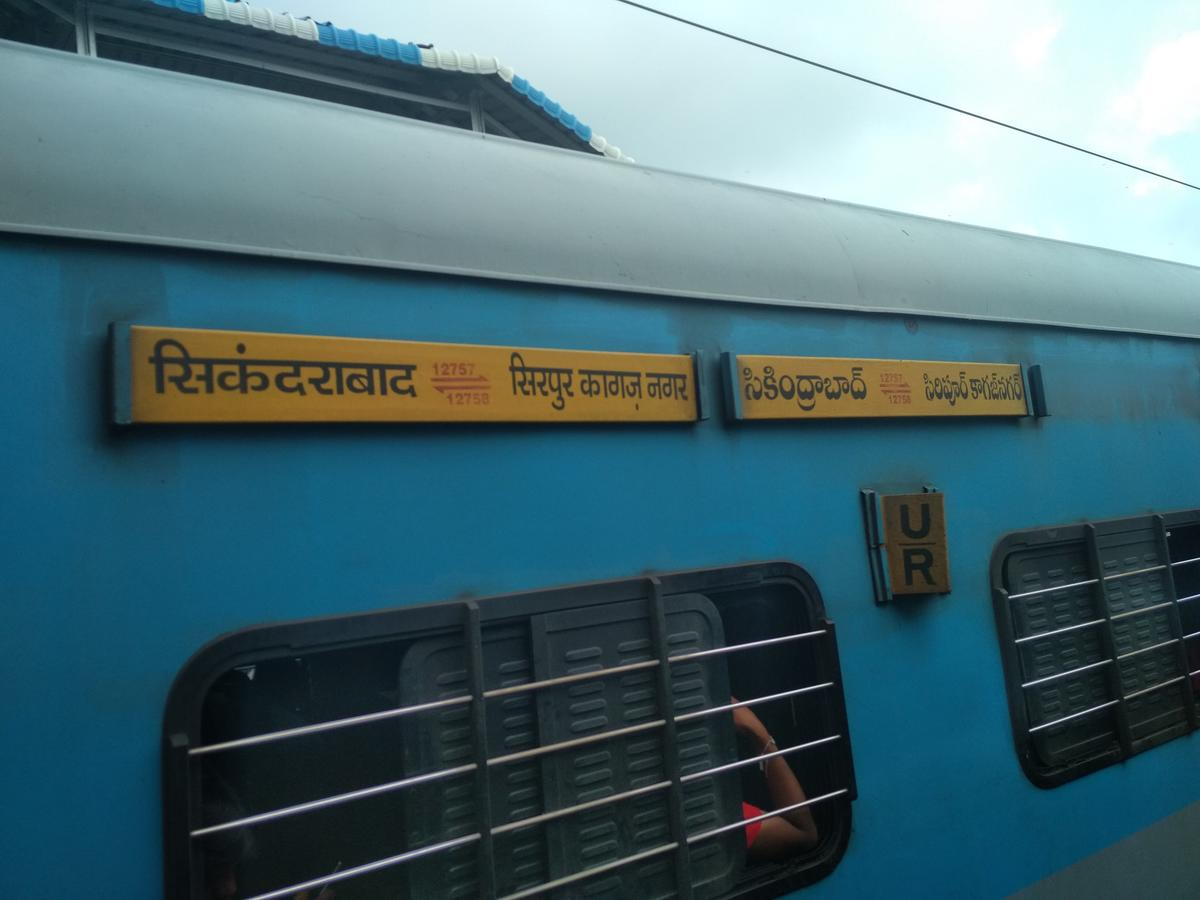
UR Coach
