= Lucknow–Vindhyachal Intercity Express =

Passenger train in India

Lucknow Vindhyachal Intercity Express
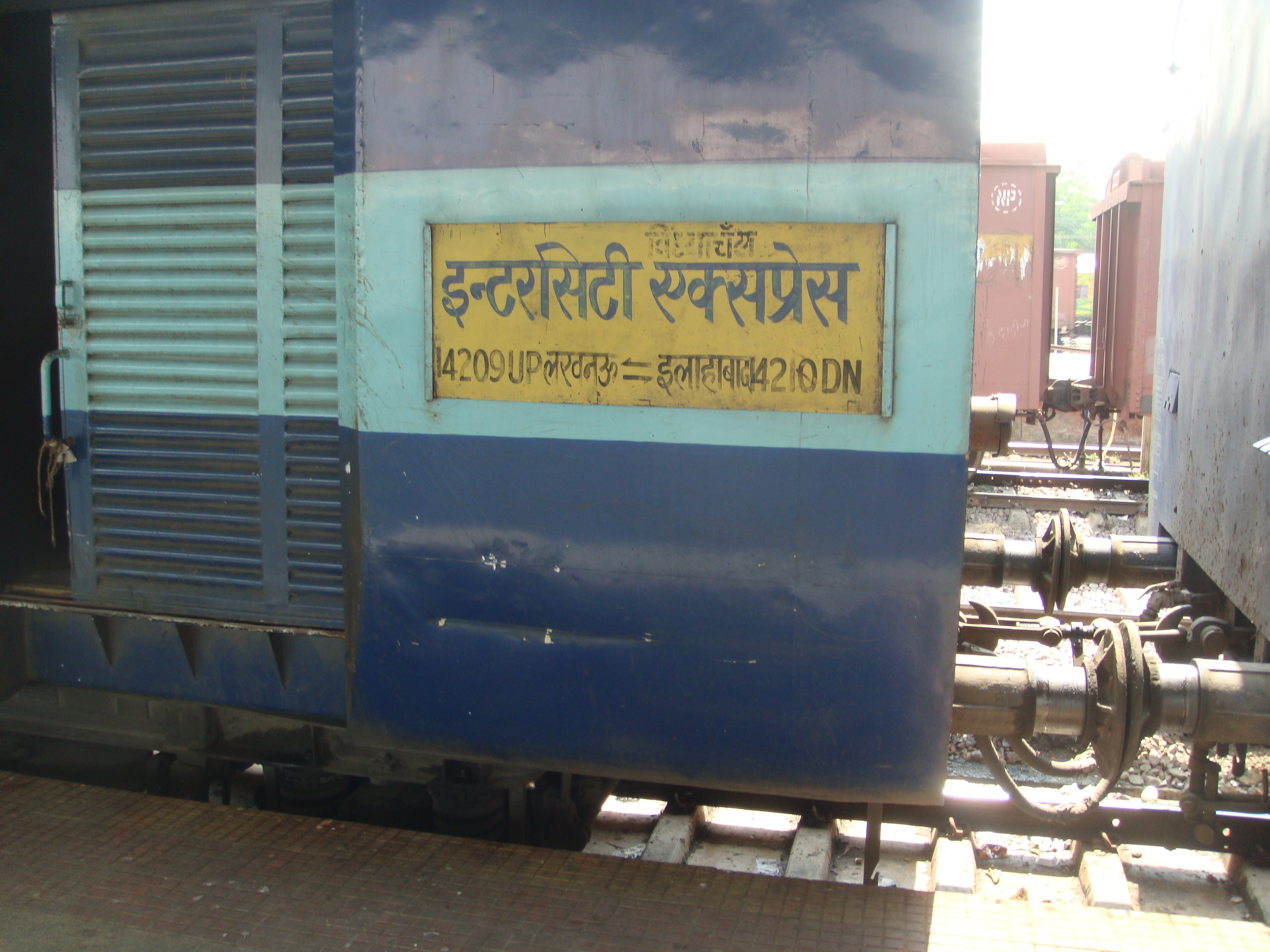

Overview
- Service type: Express
- Locale: Uttar Pradesh
- Current operator(s): Northern Railways

Route
- Termini: Lucknow Charbagh; Vindhyachal
- Stops: 12
- Distance travelled: 284 km (176 mi)
- Average journey time: 5 hours 40 minutes as 14209 Vindhyachal Lucknow Intercity Express, 5 hours 45 minutes as 14210 Lucknow Vindhyachal Intercity Express
- Service frequency: daily
- Train number(s): 14209 / 14210

On-board services
- Class(es): AC Chair Car, Second Class sitting, General Unreserved
- Seating arrangements: Yes
- Sleeping arrangements: No
- Catering facilities: No Pantry Car
- Observation facilities: Reversal of direction at Allahabad Junction.

Technical
- Track gauge: 1,676 mm (5 ft 6 in)
- Operating speed: 110 km/h (68 mph) maximum 49.75 km/h (31 mph), including halts

The 14209/14210 Lucknow Vindhyachal Intercity Express is an express train belonging to Indian Railways that runs between Lucknow and Vindhyachal in India.

== Coaches ==
The 14209/14210 Lucknow Vindhyachal Intercity Express presently has 1 AC Chair Car, 9 General Second Class and 2 General Unreserved coaches.

As is customary with Indian Railways, coaches are added/removed as per the demand.

== Service ==
The 14209/14210 Lucknow Vindhyachal Intercity Express covers the distance of 284 kilometres in 5 hours 40 mins as 14209 Vindhyachal Lucknow Intercity Express (50.12 km/h) and 5 hours 45 mins as 14210 Lucknow Vindhyachal Intercity Express (49.39 km/h).

It reverses direction at Allahabad Junction.

== Traction ==
It is a total diesel haul train. A Lucknow based WDM 3A hauls the train in both directions.

== Time Table ==
14210 Lucknow Vindhyachal Intercity Express leaves Lucknow Charbagh on a daily basis at 07:30 hrs IST and reaches Vindhyachal at 13:15 hrs IST.

On return, 14209 Vindhyachal Lucknow Intercity Express leaves Vindhyachal on a daily basis at 13:45 hrs IST and reaches Lucknow Charbagh at 19:25 hrs IST.

Station Code	Station Name	14210 - Lucknow to Vindhyachal		Distance from Source in km	Day	14209 - Vindhyachal to Lucknow		Distance from Source in km	Day
Station Code	Station Name	Arrival	Departure	Distance from Source in km	Day	Arrival	Departure	Distance from Source in km	Day
LKO	Lucknow	Source	07:30	0	1	19:25	Destination	284	1
NHN	Nigohan	08:10	08:12	36	1	18:10	18:12	248	1
BCN	Bachhrawan	08:24	08:26	48	1	17:55	17:57	236	1
HCP	Harchandpur	08:31	08:33	63	1	17:40	17:42	221	1
RBL	Raebareli	09:13	09:15	78	1	17:24	17:26	206	1
UCR	Unchahar Junction	09:48	09:50	116	1	16:45	16:47	168	1
KHNM	Kunda Harnamganj	16:21	16:23	138	1	10:15	10:17	146	1
PRG	Prayag Junction	11:29	11:31	195	1	15:32	15:34	89	1
ALD	Allahabad Junction	11:45	12:00	201	1	15:00	15:20	83	1
MJA	Meja Road	12:28	12:30	239	1	14:20	14:22	45	1
MNF	Manda Road	12:44	12:46	256	1	14:04	14:06	28	1
BDL	Vindhyachal	13:15	Destination	284	1	Source	13:45	0	1
