= Dr. Ambedkar Nagar–Bhopal Intercity Express =

Train in India

Dr. Ambedkar Nagar - Bhopal Intercity Express
Overview
- Service type: Intercity Express
- Locale: Madhya Pradesh
- Current operator: Western Railways

Route
- Termini: Dr. Ambedkar Nagar; Bhopal Junction
- Stops: 8
- Distance travelled: 238 km (148 mi)(Indore)
- Average journey time: 4 hours 35 minutes
- Service frequency: Daily
- Train number: 19323/19324;

On-board services
- Classes: 2nd sitting, AC Chair, General Unreserved
- Seating arrangements: Available
- Auto-rack arrangements: Available
- Catering facilities: Available
- Observation facilities: ICF coach
- Baggage facilities: Available

Technical
- Rolling stock: ICF coach
- Track gauge: 1,676 mm (5 ft 6 in)
- Operating speed: 90.00 km/h maximum 49 km/h (30 mph) (average with halts)
Route map
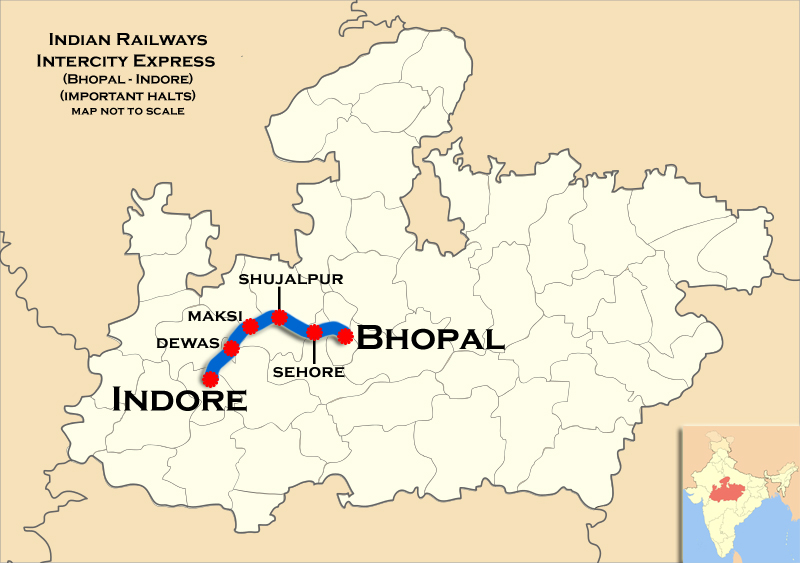

The 19323/19324 Dr. Ambedkar Nagar - Bhopal Intercity Express is a daily intercity express train which runs between Dr. Ambedkar Nagar of Mhow and Bhopal Junction.

This train was previously running between Indore Junction and Bhopal Junction, but the train was extended up to Dr. Ambedkar Nagar in 2019.

== Coach Composition ==
The train consists of 23 coaches :

- 3 AC Chair Car
- 6 Reserved Chair Car
- 12 Second Class Chair Car
- 2 SLR cum Luggage Car

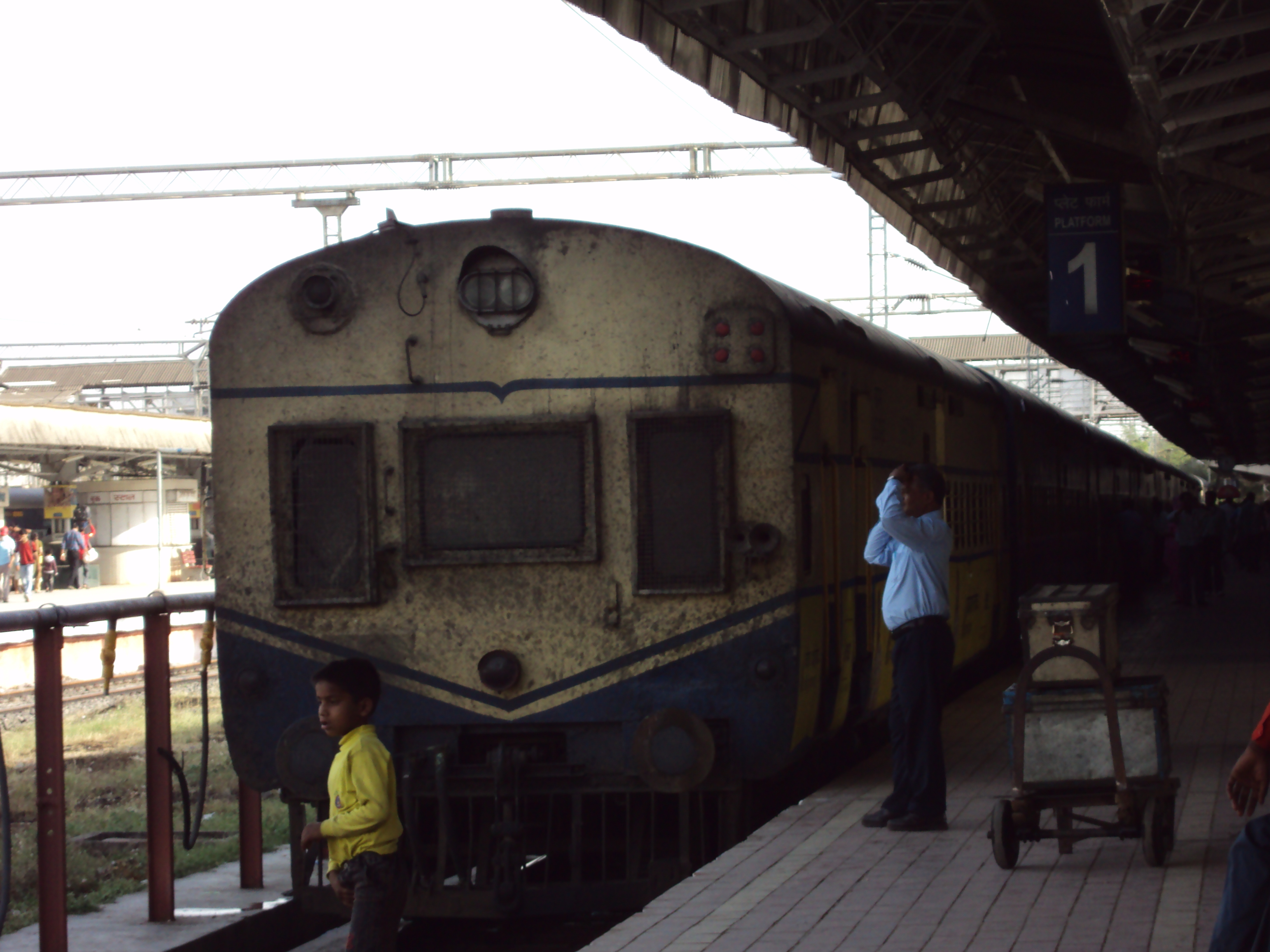
Bhopal – Dr. Ambedkar Nagar Intercity Express, about to depart for Dr. Ambedkar Nagar from Platform No. 1, Bhopal Railway Station

== Service ==
The 19323/Dr. Ambedkar Nagar - Bhopal Intercity Express has an average speed of 52 km/h and covers 238 km in 4 hrs 35 mins.

The 19324/Bhopal - Dr. Ambedkar Nagar Intercity Express has an average speed of 45 km/h and covers 238 km in 5 hrs 15 mins.

== Route and halts ==
The important halts of the train are :

- Dr. Ambedkar Nagar
- Indore Junction
- Dewas Junction
- Maksi Junction
- Shujalpur
- Kalapipal
- Sant Hirdaram Nagar
- Bhopal Junction

== Schedule ==
Train Number	Station Code	Departure Station	Departure Time	Departure Day	Arrival Station	Arrival Time	Arrival Day
19323	DADN	Dr. Ambedkar Nagar	06:15 AM	Daily	Bhopal Junction	10:50 AM	Daily
19324	BPL	Bhopal Junction	16:55 PM	Daily	Dr. Ambedkar Nagar	22:10 PM	Daily

== Rake Sharing ==
The train shares its rake with 59393/59394 Bhopal - Dahod Fast Passenger.

== Traction ==
Both trains are hauled by a Vadodara Locomotive Shed based WAP-5 or WAP-4E electric locomotive.
