= Guwahati–Mariani Intercity Express =

Guwahati–Mariani Junction Intercity Express
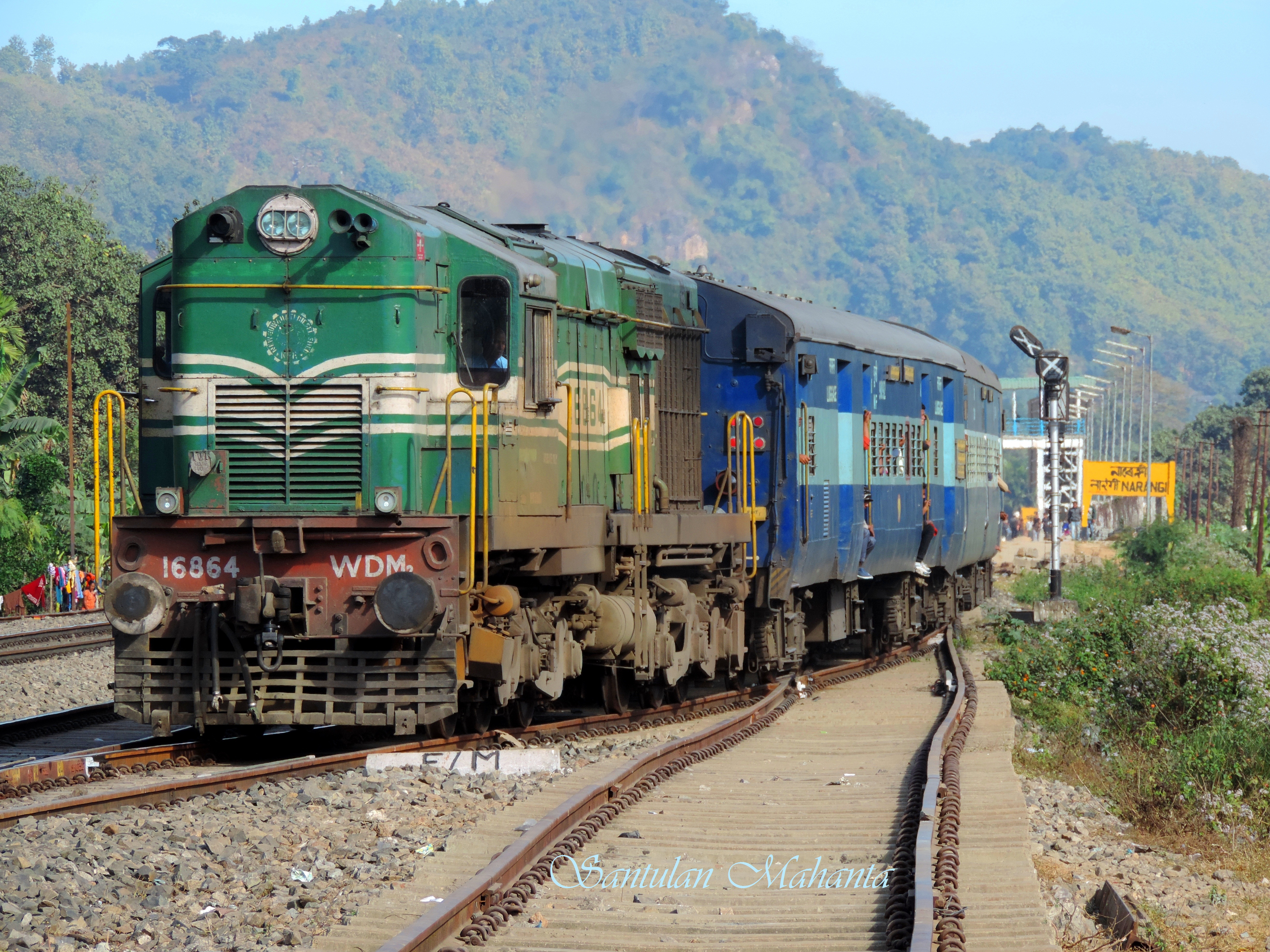
- Ex-GOC, now NGC WDM-2 16864 leading 15718 Mariani–Guwahati Intercity Express exits Narangi station

Overview
- Service type: Intercity
- Current operator: Northeast Frontier Railway zone

Route
- Termini: Guwahati (GHY); Mariani Junction (MXN)
- Stops: 25
- Distance travelled: 404 km (251 mi)
- Average journey time: 11 hours 12 mins
- Service frequency: Daily
- Train number: 15717 / 15718

On-board services
- Class: General unreserved
- Seating arrangements: Yes
- Sleeping arrangements: Yes
- Catering facilities: No

Technical
- Rolling stock: ICF coach
- Operating speed: 37 km/h (23 mph)
Route map
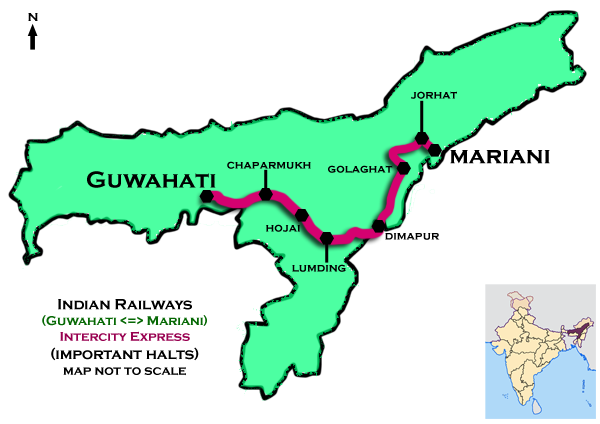

The 15717 / 18 Guwahati–Mariani Junction Intercity Express is an Express train belonging to Northeast Frontier Railway zone of Indian Railways that runs between Guwahati and Mariani Junction in India.

It operates as train number 15717 from Guwahati to Mariani Junction and as train number 15718 in the reverse direction, serving the states of Assam.

== Coaches ==
The 15717 / 18 Guwahati–Mariani Junction Intercity Express has nine general unreserved & two SLR (seating with luggage rake) coaches. It does not carry a pantry car.

As is customary with most train services in India, coach composition may be amended at the discretion of Indian Railways depending on demand.

== Service ==
The 15717 Guwahati–Mariani Junction Intercity Express covers the distance of 404 km (251 mi) in 11 hours 15 mins (36 km/h) and in 10 hours 30 mins as the 15718 Mariani Junction–Guwahati Intercity Express (38 km/h).

As the average speed of the train is lower than 55 km/h (34 mph), as per railway rules, its fare doesn't include a Superfast surcharge.

== Routing ==
The 15717 / 18 Guwahati–Mariani Junction Intercity Express runs from Guwahati via Chaparmukh Junction, Lumding Junction, Dimapur to Mariani Junction.

== Traction ==
As the route is going to electrification, a New Guwahati-based WDM-3D diesel locomotive pulls the train to its destination.
