= Yesvantpur–Hassan Intercity Express =

22679 / 80 Yesvantpur Junction - Hassan Superfast MEMU Express

Yesvantpur Junction - Hassan Intercity Express
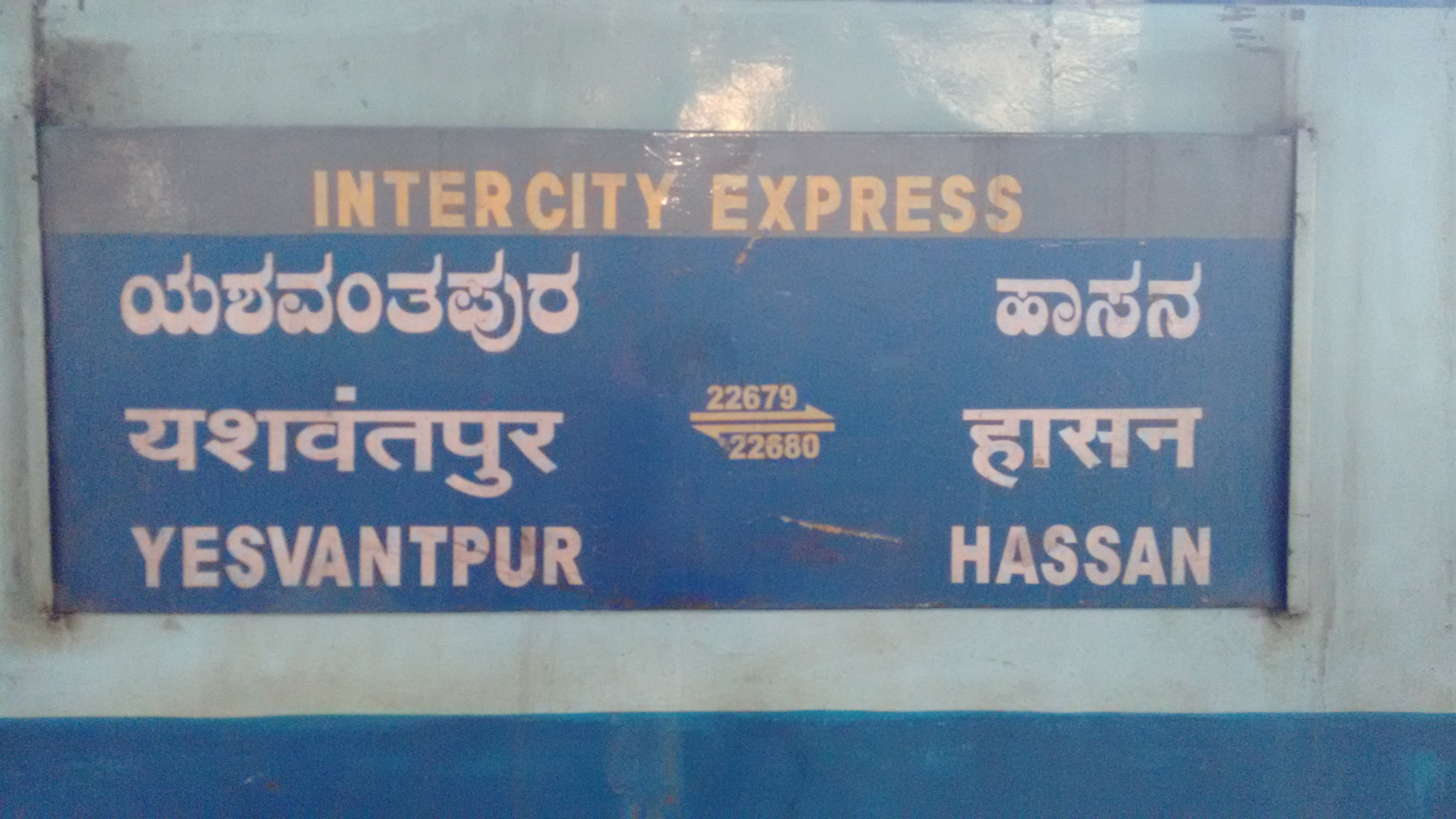

Overview
- Service type: Superfast
- First service: 27 March 2017; 9 years ago
- Current operator: South Western Railway zone

Route
- Termini: Yesvantpur Junction; Hassan Junction
- Stops: 8
- Distance travelled: 174 km (108 mi)
- Average journey time: 3 hours 10 mins
- Service frequency: Daily
- Train number: 22679 / 22680

On-board services
- Classes: general unreserved, Chair car, ac chair car
- Seating arrangements: Yes
- Sleeping arrangements: No
- Catering facilities: No

Technical
- Rolling stock: MEMU (Formerly ICF coaches)
- Operating speed: 55 kilometres per hour (34 mph) (Maximum: 110 kilometres per hour (68 mph))
Route map
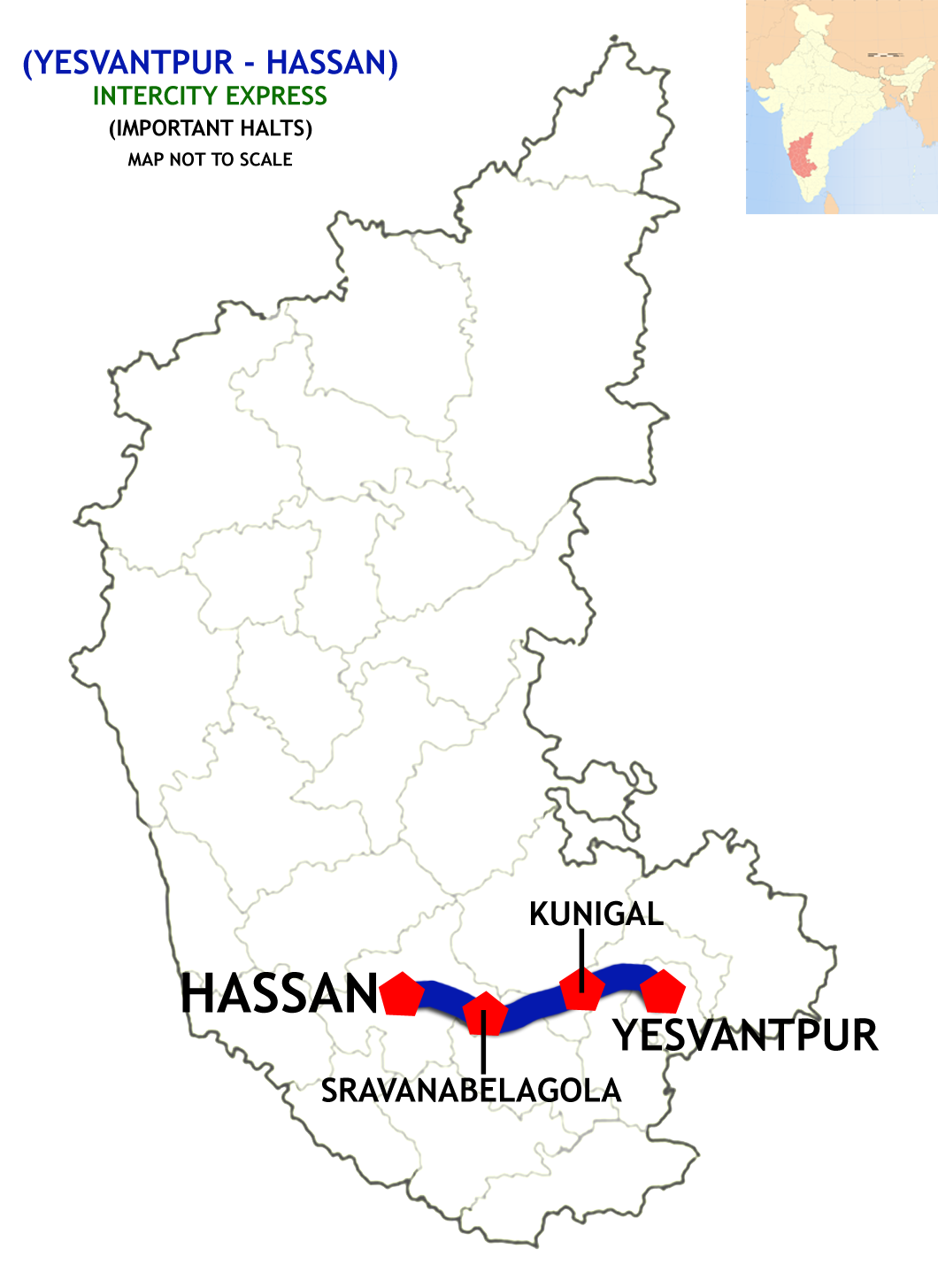

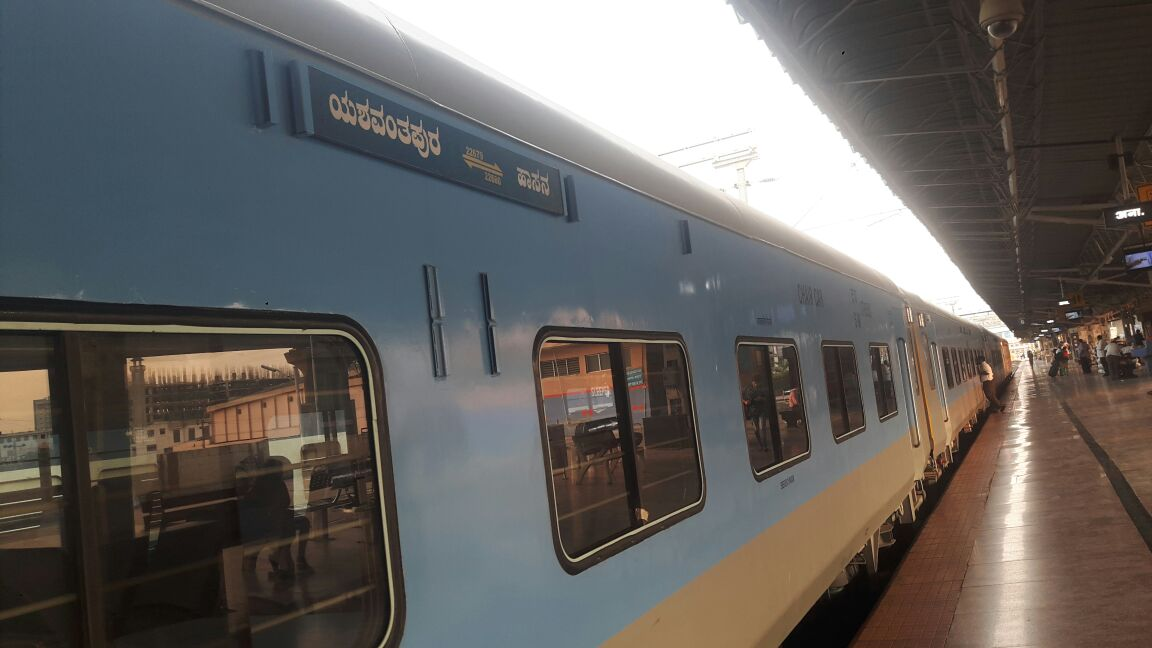
Yesvantpur–Hassan Intercity Express Train board Kannada

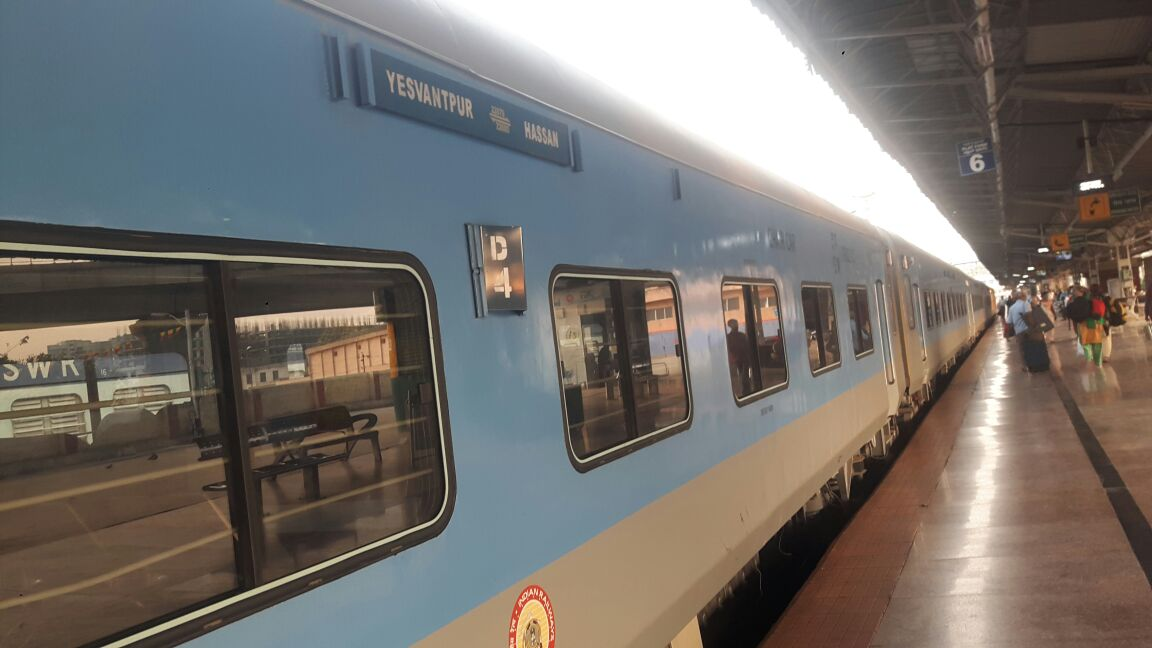
Yesvantpur–Hassan Intercity Express Train board English

The 22679 / 80 Yesvantpur Junction - Hassan MEMU Express is a Superfast train belonging to Indian Railways South Western Railway zone that runs between Yesvantpur Junction and Hassan Junction in India.

It operates as train number 22679 from Yesvantpur Junction to Hassan Junction and as train number 22680 in the reverse direction serving the states of Karnataka.

== Coaches ==
The 22679 / 80 Yesvantpur Junction - Hassan MEMU Express has 12 Unreserved coaches .

This train used to have LHB coaches, but it was downgraded to ICF coaches by July 2024. This was done to create less pollution for a diesel locomotive (WDP-4/4D) to pull the ICF rake compared to LHB rake which have the generator cars. It was expected that the train would soon bring back the LHB rake as this train would get an electric locomotive (WAP-7), which would result in no pollution at all (because of HOG technology which means: electric locomotive is connected to the generator car). But due to some issues it was upgraded to MEMU South Western Railway.

As is customary with most train services in India, coach composition may be amended at the discretion of Indian Railways depending on demand.

== Service ==
The 22679 Yesvantpur Junction - Hassan Junction Intercity Express covers the distance of 174 km (108 mi) in 3 hours 10 mins (55 km/h) and in 3 hours 10 mins as the 22680 Hassan Junction - Yesvantpur Junction Intercity Express (55 km/h).

As the average speed of the train is higher than 55 km/h (34 mph), as per railway rules, its fare includes a Superfast surcharge.

== Routing ==
The 22679 / 80 Yesvantpur Junction - Hassan MEMU Express runs from Yesvantpur Junction via Shravanabelagola to Hassan Junction.

== Traction ==
Early on, this train operated with a WDP-4 locomotive on both inaugural and official commercial run. It also used to operate with a Krishnarajapuram based WAP-7 electric locomotive to pull the train to its destination. Presently, it uses MEMU for its operations
