= Anekal derailment =

2015 railway incident in India

Details
- Date: 13 February 2015; 07:35 IST (UTC+05:30)
- Location: Anekal, Karnataka
- Coordinates: 12.718072°N 77.710795°E
- Country: India
- Line: Bangalore–Salem line
- Operator: Southern Railway (train); South Western Railway (line)
- Owner: Indian Railways
- Service: Bangalore–Ernakulam Intercity Express
- Incident type: Derailment
- Cause: Broken Rail

Statistics
- Trains: 1 (SMVT Bengaluru - Ernakulam Express)
- Vehicles: WDM-3D diesel locomotive
- Deaths: 10
- Injured: 150+
- Damage: ₹1.11 crore (equivalent to ₹1.7 crore, US$170,000, €150,000 or £130,000 in 2023)

The Anekal derailment occurred at 7.35 a.m. on 13 February 2015, when nine coaches of the Ernakulam-bound Intercity Express derailed near Anekal in the Bangalore Urban district of Karnataka, India. Ten people were killed and over 150 injured.

== Derailment ==
At 7:35 local time, nine bogies of the Bangalore-Ernakulam Intercity Express (Train No. 12677), operated by Indian Railways, derailed near Anekal in the Bidaragere area near Mulagondapalli and Chandrapuram. The derailment occurred in a narrow lane of track. Passengers reported that within three to five seconds, they felt the carriage suddenly jerk and then the train came to a screeching halt with a loud crash. The D9 compartment crashed into the D8 and its bogie crushed the first four rows of seats of the D8 compartment. Many of the D8 passengers were trapped and some were killed.

== Rescue and recovery ==
Karnataka police and fire departments received dozens of calls from eyewitnesses, almost immediately after the derailment. The Karnataka Fire Department and voluntary rescue workers arrived at the scene minutes later and began removing survivors from the coaches.

== Investigation ==
An early press report regarding the upcoming preliminary report stated that the derailment was caused by the railway engineers (track supervisors) who allowed the speed limit to be lifted prematurely in an area where a previous broken rail occurred. The report also said that there was no boulder on the track causing the derailment.

A preliminary report was issued 17 March 2015 by the Commissioner of Railway Safety (CRS) which stated the cause was a broken rail. A track worker passed the derailment site half an hour before the derailment and saw no obvious defects nor any boulder. The railway reported financial damages from the accident of ₹1.11 crore (equivalent to ₹1.7 crore, US$170,000, €150,000 or £130,000 in 2023).

According to a news report in January 2016, an official with the railway stated that a final report was sent by CRS Satish Kumar Mittal to the railway approximately November 2015. That report, which was still not public at the time, placed the blame chiefly on the Senior Section Engineer with culpability shared by the Loco-Pilot (Train Driver) and the Coach Factory which maintains the passenger coaches.

The final report also states that the train was operating at less than 80 kilometres per hour (50 mph), which was below the 100 kilometres per hour (62 mph) speed limit. The report also gives the death toll as nine with an injury count of only 42.

The Section Engineer was assigned the brunt of the fault because he allowed full running speed on the section of track too quickly after another rail fracture had been repaired a few feet from where this derailment took place. That first fracture and repair had occurred the day before the derailment. The Section Engineer was blamed because he allowed full running speed on the section of track less than 24 hours after the repair.

The Coach Factory was blamed for allowing the coach's undercarriages to become corroded and weakened which contributed to the severity of the derailment. The Pilot was blamed for not having faster reaction time to the incident. The labour union representing the Pilot, The All India Loco Running Staff Association, strongly objected to this assignment of blame. They state that since the train was operated at 63 kilometres per hour (39 mph), far below the speed limit, their driver cannot have any responsibility for the incident. They also claimed the accident was not caused by boulders on the tracks.
