= Yesvantpur–Shivamogga Town Intercity Express =

Train in India

Yesvantpur - Shimoga Town Intercity Express
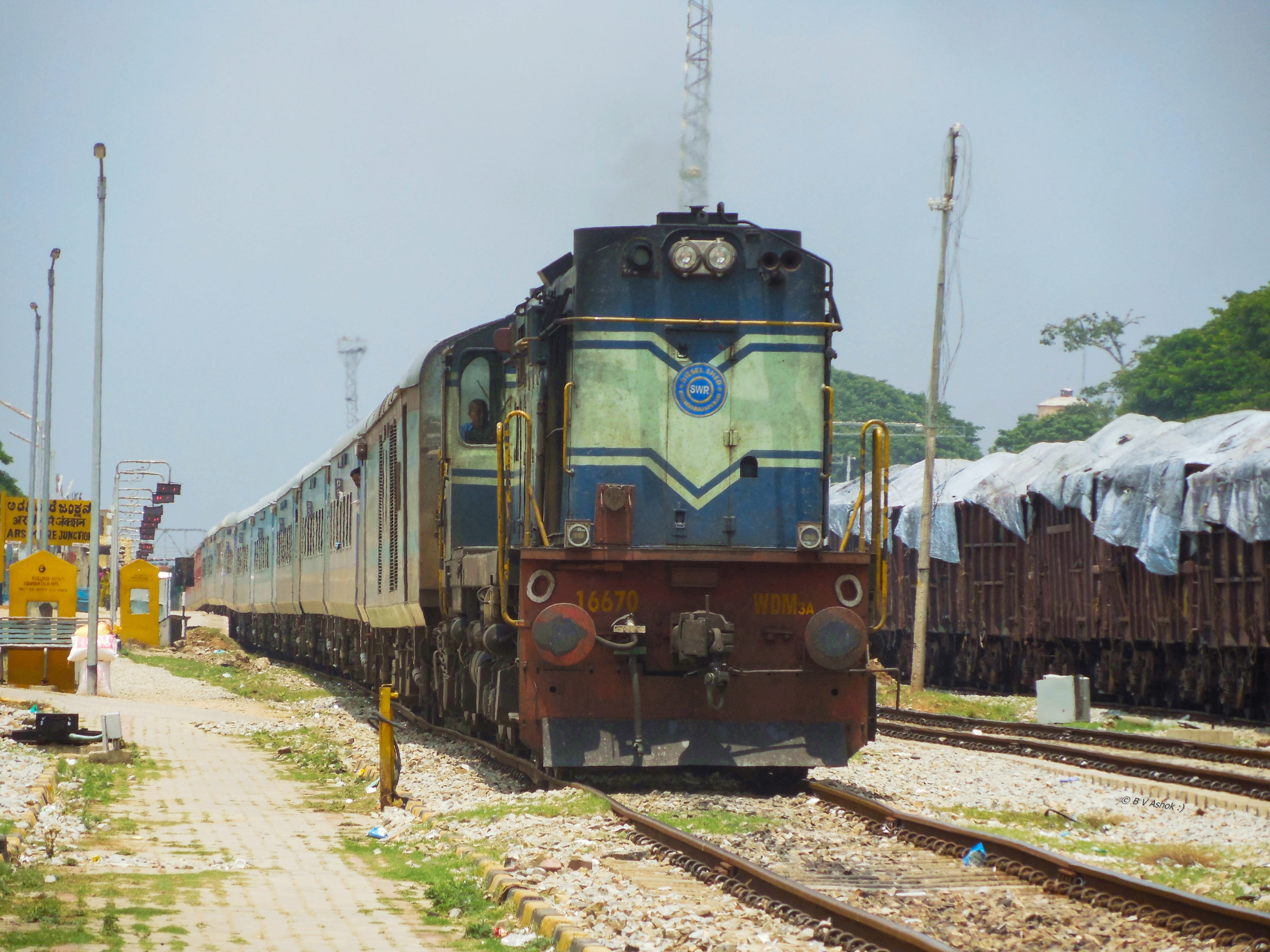
- KJM WDM-3A 16670 chugging out of Arsikere junction with 16579 Yeshvantapur - Shimoga Town Intercity Express

Overview
- Service type: Express
- First service: 6 December 2014; 11 years ago
- Current operator: South Western Railway zone

Route
- Termini: Yesvantpur Junction; Shimoga Town
- Stops: 9
- Distance travelled: 274 km (170 mi)
- Average journey time: 5 hours 17 mins
- Service frequency: Daily
- Train number: 16579 / 16580

On-board services
- Classes: general unreserved, AC chair car, Chair car
- Seating arrangements: Yes
- Sleeping arrangements: Yes
- Catering facilities: No

Technical
- Rolling stock: Standard Indian Railways Coaches
- Operating speed: 47 km/h (29 mph)

The 16579 / 80 Yesvantpur - Shimoga Town Intercity Express is an Express train belonging to Indian Railways South Western Railway zone that runs between Yesvantpur Junction and Shimoga Town in India.

It operates as train number 16579 from Yesvantpur Junction to Shimoga Town and as train number 16580 in the reverse direction serving the states of Karnataka.

== Coaches ==
The 16579 / 80 Yesvantpur - Shimoga Town Intercity Express has one AC chair car, five chair car, 14 general unreserved, two SLR (seating with luggage rake) and also a Vistadome coach . It does not carry a pantry car coach.

As is customary with most train services in India, coach composition may be amended at the discretion of Indian Railways depending on demand.

== Service ==
The 16579 Yesvantpur Junction - Shimoga Town Intercity Express covers the distance of 268 km (167 mi) in 5 hours 45 mins (47 km/h) and in 5 hours 30 mins as the 16580 Shimoga Town - Yesvantpur Junction Intercity Express (49 km/h).

As the average speed of the train is lower than 55 km/h (34 mph), as per railway rules, its fare doesn't includes a Superfast surcharge.

== Routing ==
The 16579 / 80 Yesvantpur - Shimoga Town Intercity Express runs from Yesvantpur Junction via Arsikere Junction to Shimoga Town.

== Traction ==
earlier was WDM-3A or WDM-3D. As the route is completely electrified, a Krishnarajapuram based WAP-7 Electric locomotive pulls the train to its destination.
