= KSR Bengaluru–Ernakulam Intercity Express =

Train in India

KSR Bengaluru–Ernakulam Junction Intercity Express
Overview
- Service type: Superfast Express
- Locale: Karnataka, Tamil Nadu & Kerala
- First service: 15 April 1998; 28 years ago
- Current operator: Southern Railway
- Ridership: Bangalore Division & Thiruvananthapuram Division - Indian railway

Route
- Termini: KSR Bengaluru City (SBC); Ernakulam Junction (ERS)
- Stops: 12
- Distance travelled: 587 km (365 mi)
- Average journey time: 10 hrs 40 mins
- Service frequency: Daily
- Train number: 16377 / 16378

On-board services
- Classes: General Unreserved, Second Class Seating, AC Chair Car
- Seating arrangements: Yes
- Sleeping arrangements: No
- Auto-rack arrangements: Overhead racks
- Catering facilities: On-board catering, E-catering
- Observation facilities: Large windows
- Entertainment facilities: No
- Baggage facilities: No
- Other facilities: Below the seats

Technical
- Rolling stock: LHB coach
- Track gauge: 1,676 mm (5 ft 6 in)
- Operating speed: 50 km/h (31 mph) average including halts.
Route map
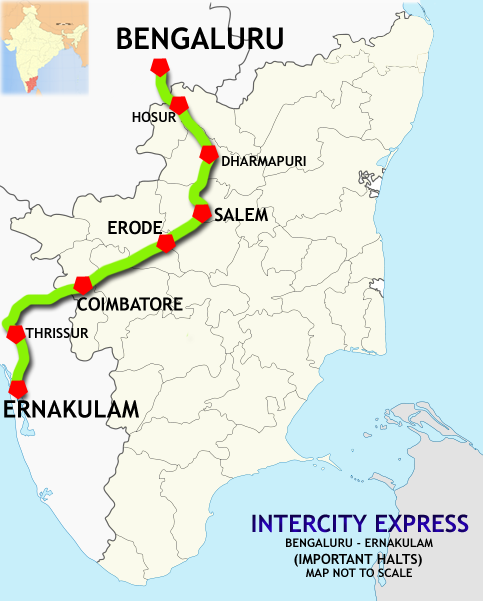

The 16377 / 16378 KSR Bengaluru–Ernakulam Intercity Express is a daily intercity express train which runs daily between K.S.R Bengaluru City Junction and Ernakulam Junction via Hosur.

== History ==
In the railway budget of the year 1997–98, a plan was proposed to introduce a superfast train between Coimbatore and Bangalore. On 15 April 1998, Bangalore–Coimbatore Intercity Express train was inaugurated as Train no: 2677. In the year 2008, the service was extended till Ernakulam as Train no: 12677 after few temporary runs.

== Train information ==
The train is hauled by an Erode (EDDX or EDE) or Arakkonambased WAP-4 throughout the journey. Before the commissioning of electrification of the Bengaluru (Baiyyappanahalli) - Salem line on 2 July 2022, the train used to be hauled by a Golden Rock based WDP-4D (earlier Erode-based), WDG-4 or WDP-4B or an Erode based WDM-3D from Bangalore to Erode, and an Erode-based WAP-4 from Erode to Ernakulam.

This train runs daily each way, as Train no: 12677 (Ernakulam Exp) departing Bangalore City Junction at 06:10hrs and reaching Ernakulam Junction at 16:55 hrs and Train no: 12678 (Bangalore Exp) departing Ernakulam Junction at 09:10 hrs and reaching Bangalore City Junction at 21:00 hrs. It covers a distance of 587 kilometres (365 mi) in each direction.

During the COVID-19 pandemic, the train was numbered as 02677/02678 and was hauled by a Golden Rock-based WDP4D or WDP4B throughout the journey.

Ernakulam - KSR Bengaluru Intercity Express crossing Bharathapuzha river

=== Rake/coach composition ===
Since June 20, 2025, the train started running with an upgraded LHB rake. The rake of the train consists of 4 unreserved coaches, 11 second sitting coaches, 2 AC chair car coach, a pantry car and 2 SLR cars, making a total of 20 coaches.

LOCO	SLR	GEN	GEN	D1	D2	D3	D4	D5	D6	D7	D8	D9	D10	D11	PC	C1	C2	GEN	GEN	EOG

SLR – Sitting cum luggage rake

UR – Unreserved

D – Second sitting

C – AC chair car

PC – Pantry car

EOG - End on generation car

== Major Incidents ==
On 13 February 2015, the train derailed on its onward journey to Ernakulam from Bangalore, leading to 10 deaths and injuring 150 people.

- The Ernakulam Junction to KSR Bangalore Intercity Superfast Express Degraded to a Normal Intercity Express train onwards December 3&4 2025 in Both Directions with Number 16377/16378
