= Kaithal railway station =

Railway station in Haryana, India

Kaithal
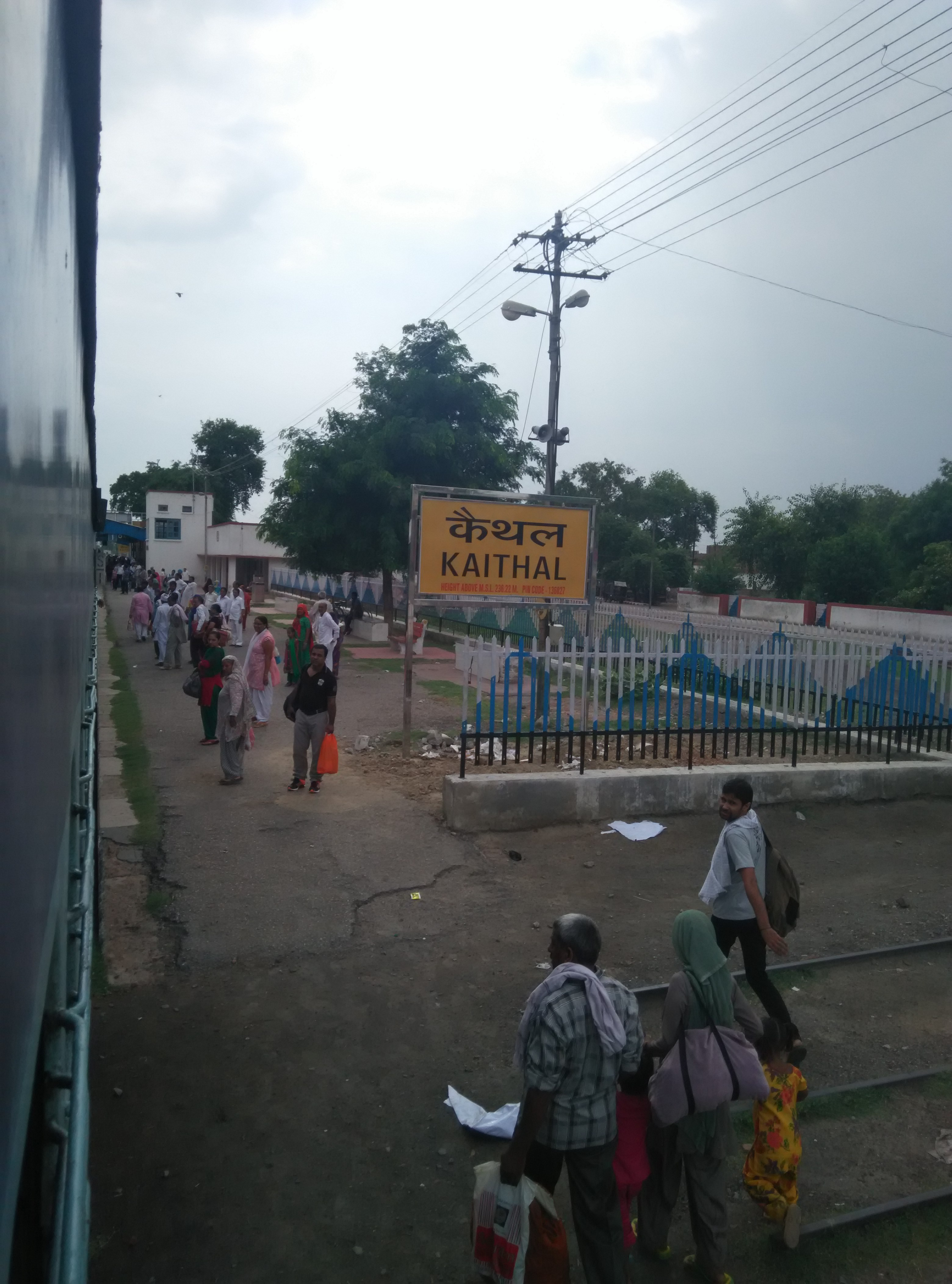

General information
- Location: Railway Station Road, Kaithal, Haryana; India
- Coordinates: 29°47′35″N 76°23′53″E
- Elevation: 237 metres (778 ft)
- System: Indian Railways station
- Owner: Indian Railways
- Operator: Northern Railway
- Line: Kurukshetra–Narwana line
- Tracks: 5 ft 6 in (1,676 mm) broad gauge

Construction
- Structure type: Standard (on ground station)
- Parking: Yes
- Cycle facilities: No

Other information
- Status: Functioning
- Station code: KLE
- Division(s): Delhi

History
- Opened: 1870
Location
- Location within Haryana

Kaithal railway station (station code: KLE) is a railway station located in Kaithal district in the Indian state of Haryana. It serves the town of Kaithal and lies on the Kurukshetra–Narwana line under the Delhi Division of Northern Railway.

== Station details ==
Kaithal railway station serves the town of Kaithal and nearby areas. It is a small station equipped with basic passenger amenities such as ticket booking counters and waiting areas.

== Additional stations ==
Apart from Kaithal railway station (KLE), the town is also served by New Kaithal railway station (NKLE), providing additional rail connectivity in the region.

== Train services ==
The station is served by passenger and express trains connecting it to nearby cities such as Kurukshetra, Narwana, Jind, and Delhi.

== Connectivity ==
The station is well connected by road to nearby towns and cities. Local transport including buses, auto-rickshaws, and taxis are available for last-mile connectivity.

== See also ==
- Indian Railways
- List of railway stations in Haryana

== The railway station ==
Kaithal railway station (station code: KLE) is located in Kaithal district in the Indian state of Haryana. It lies at an elevation of 237 metres (778 ft) above mean sea level and falls under the Delhi Division of Northern Railway.
