= Chandigarh–Amritsar Intercity Express =

Train in India

Chandigarh–Amritsar Intercity Superfast Express
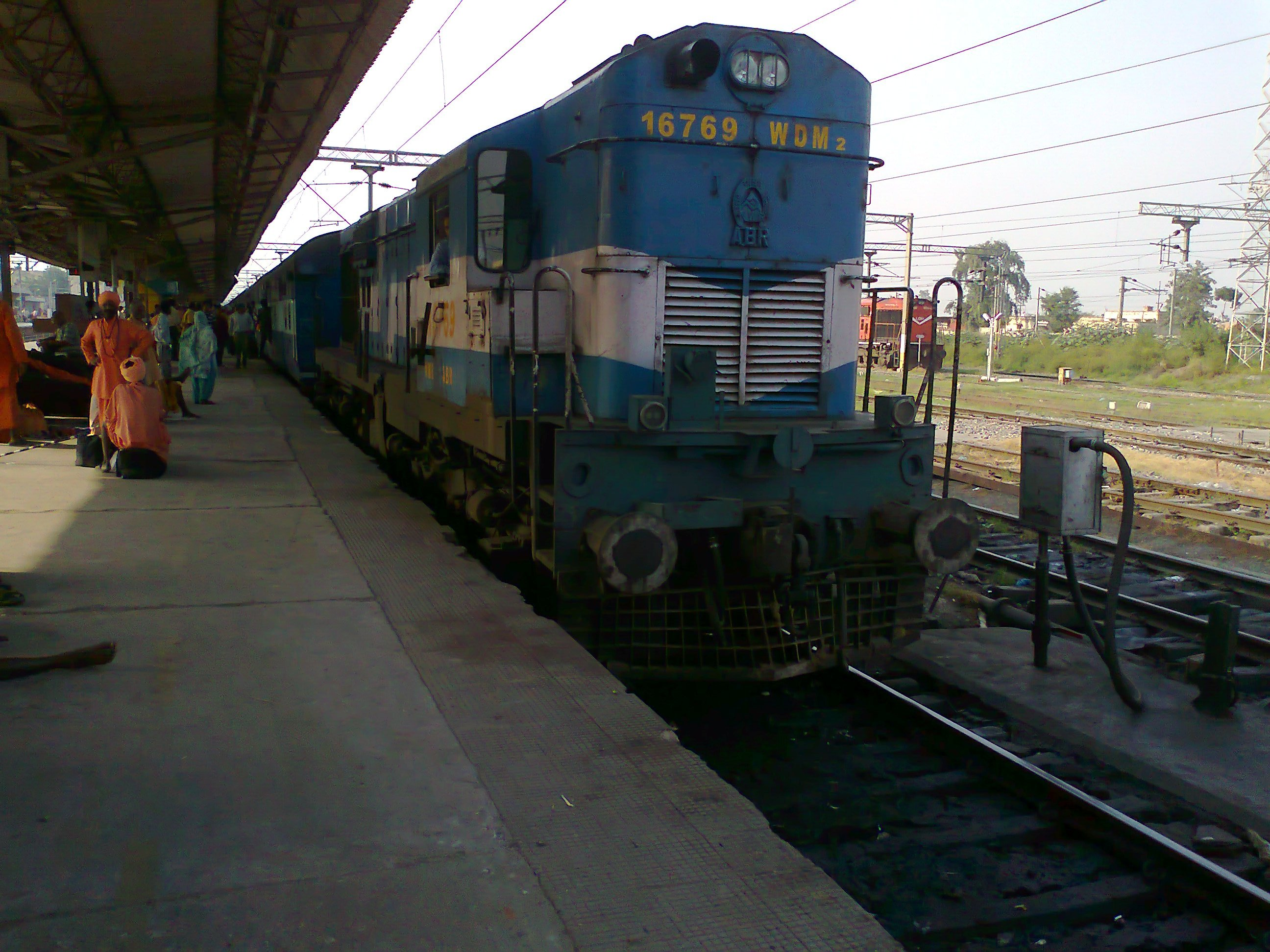

Overview
- Service type: Intercity Superfast Express
- Status: Running
- First service: 24 August 2011; 13 years ago
- Current operator(s): Northern Railways

Route
- Termini: Chandigarh (CDG); Amritsar (ASR)
- Stops: 6
- Distance travelled: 248 km (154 mi)
- Average journey time: 4 hours 30 minutes
- Service frequency: Daily
- Train number(s): 12411 / 12412

On-board services
- Class(es): AC Chair Car, Second Class seating, General Unreserved
- Seating arrangements: Yes
- Sleeping arrangements: No
- Auto-rack arrangements: Up
- Catering facilities: No pantry car attached
- Observation facilities: Large windows
- Baggage facilities: Overhead
- Other facilities: Below the seats

Technical
- Rolling stock: LHB coach
- Track gauge: 1,676 mm (5 ft 6 in)
- Electrification: Fully Electrified
- Operating speed: 59.63 km/h (37 mph) average including halts

The 12411 / 12412 Chandigarh–Amritsar Intercity Superfast Express is a Daily Intercity Superfast Express of Indian railways. It n

== Coaches ==
The 12411 / 12 Chandigarh–Amritsar Intercity Express has 1 AC Chair Car, 8 Second Class seating, 2 General Unreserved and 2 SLR (Seating cum Luggage Rake) coaches. It does not carry a pantry car. Recently it added AC and Non AC sleeper coaches as well.

As is customary with most train services in India, coach composition may be amended at the discretion of Indian Railways depending on demand.

== Service ==
The 12411 Chandigarh–Amritsar Intercity Express covers the distance of 248 kilometres in 4 hours 30 mins (55.11 km/h) and in 4 hours 25 mins as 12412 Amritsar–Chandigarh Intercity Express (56.15 km/h).

As the average speed of the train is above 55 km/h (34 mph), as per Indian Railways rules, its fare includes a Superfast surcharge.

== Routeing ==
The 12411 / 12 Chandigarh–Amritsar Intercity Express runs from Chandigarh via Ludhiana Junction, Jalandhar City, Beas to Amritsar Junction.

== Traction ==
As the entire route is fully electrified, a Ghaziabad-based WAP-5 / WAP-7 powers the train for its entire journey.

== Timings ==
- 12411 Chandigarh–Amritsar Intercity Express leaves Chandigarh on a daily basis at 06:55 hrs IST and reaches Amritsar Junction at 11:25 hrs IST the same day.
- 12412 Amritsar–Chandigarh Intercity Express leaves Amritsar Junction on a daily basis at 17:30 hrs IST and reaches Chandigarh at 21:55 hrs IST the same day.
