= Jalandhar City–New Delhi Intercity Express =

Intercity Express between New Delhi and Jalandhar City

Jalandhar City New Delhi Express
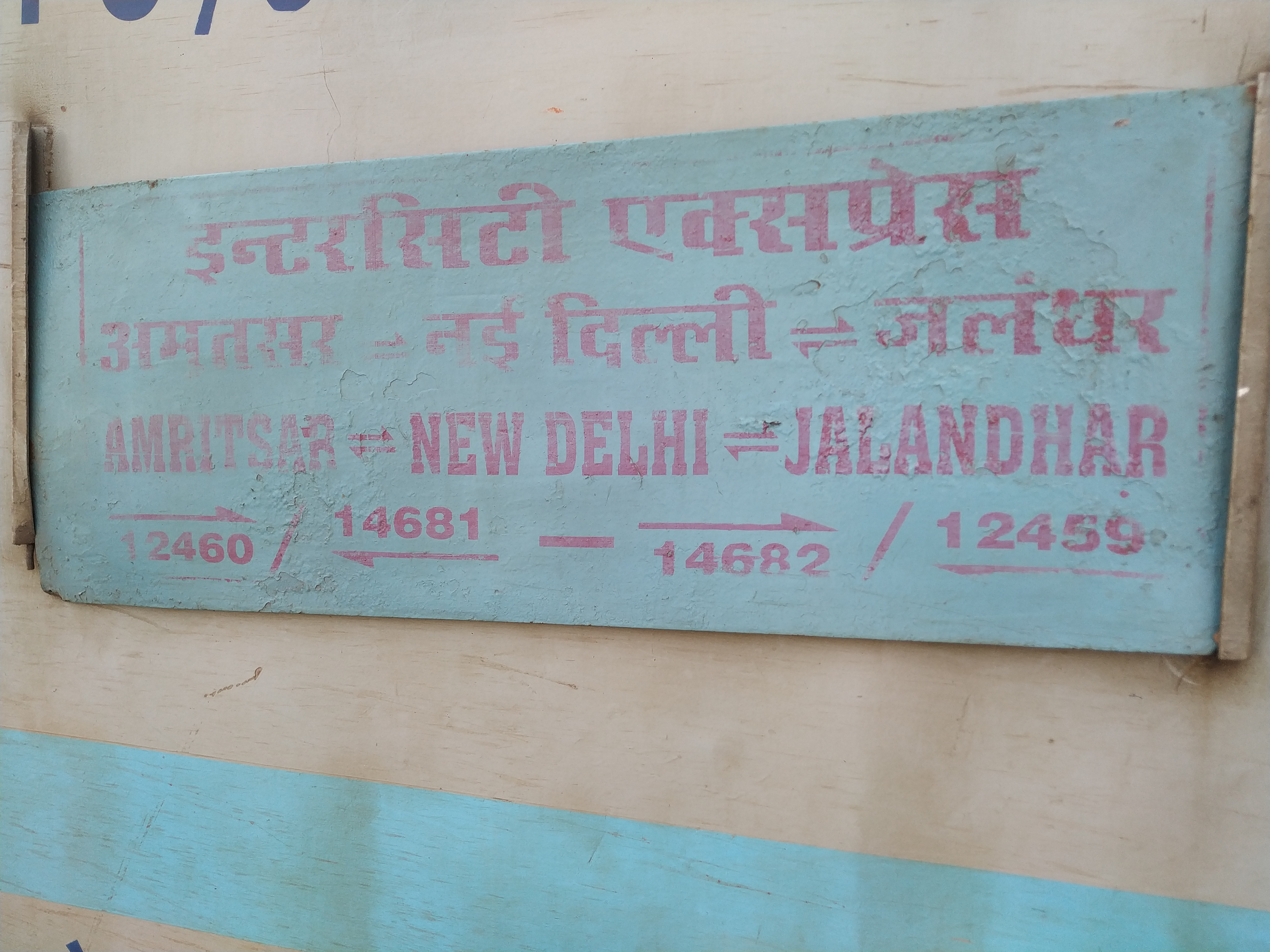
- 14681 Jalandhar Express board

Overview
- Service type: Express
- Current operator: Northern Railways

Route
- Termini: Jalandhar City; New Delhi
- Stops: 19
- Distance travelled: 439 km (273 mi)
- Average journey time: 8 hours 40 minutes as 14682 Jalandhar City New Delhi Express, 9 hours 05 minutes as 14681 New Delhi Jalandhar City Express
- Service frequency: Daily
- Train number: 14681 / 14682

On-board services
- Classes: AC Chair Car, Second Class seating, General Unreserved
- Seating arrangements: Yes
- Sleeping arrangements: No
- Catering facilities: No
- Observation facilities: LHB coaches

Technical
- Rolling stock: Standard Indian Railways coaches
- Track gauge: 1,676 mm (5 ft 6 in)
- Operating speed: 110 km/h (68 mph) maximum 49.46 km/h (31 mph) including halts

The 14682/81 Jalandhar City New Delhi Express is an Express train belonging to Indian Railways - Northern Railway zone that runs between Jalandhar City and New Delhi in India.

It operates as train number 14682 from Jalandhar City to New Delhi and as train number 14681 in the reverse direction serving the states of Punjab, Haryana, Uttar Pradesh and Delhi.

== Coaches ==
The 14682 / 81 Jalandhar City New Delhi Express has 2 AC Car, 13 Second Class seating, 3 General Unreserved and 2 SLR (Seating cum Luggage Rake) Coaches. It does not carry a Pantry car coach.

As is customary with most train services in India, Coach Composition may be amended at the discretion of Indian Railways depending on demand.

AC Chair Car coach of New Delhi-Jalandhar City Intercity Express

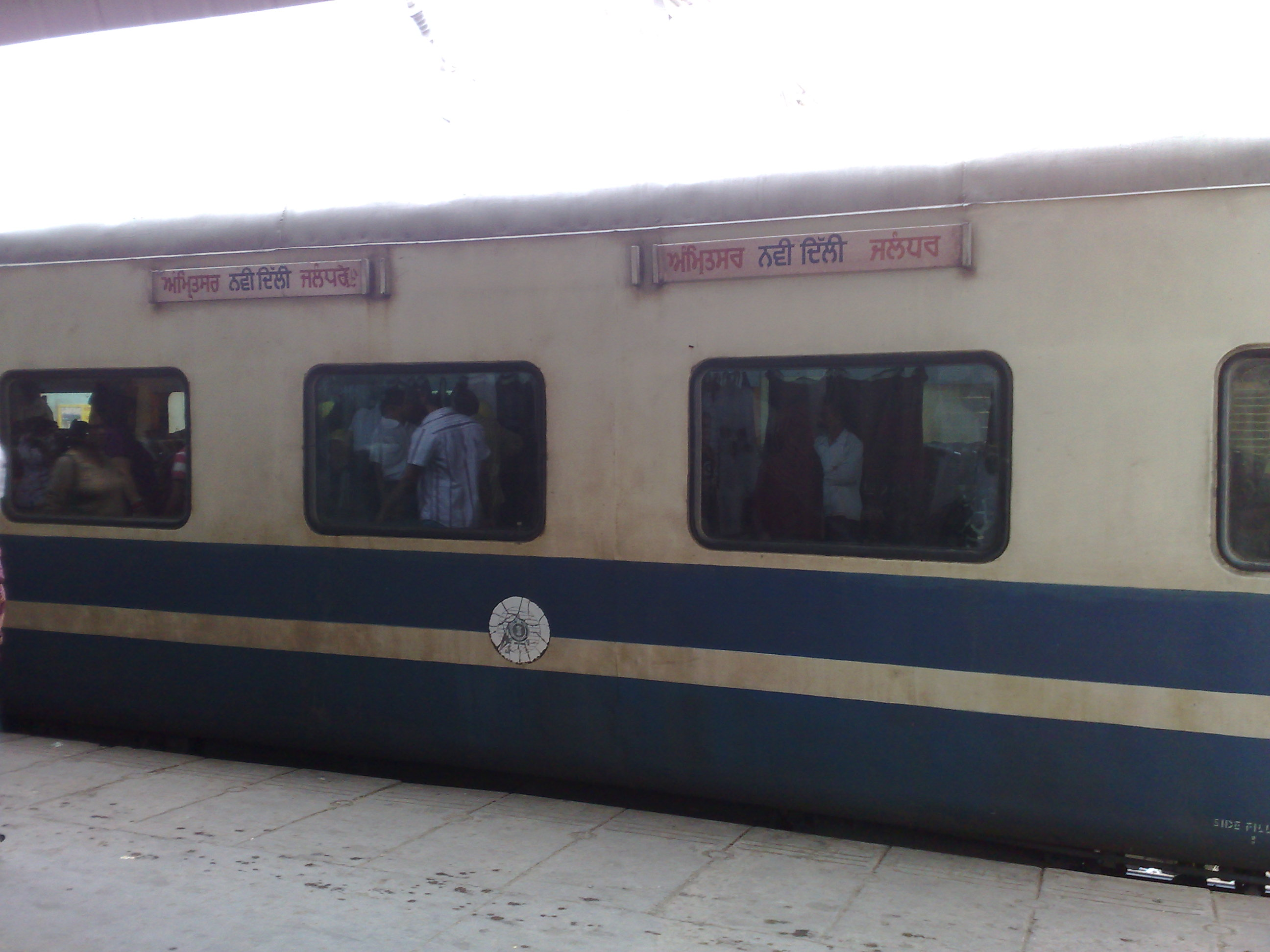
Jalandhar City New Delhi Express - previously used AC Chair Car

== Service ==
The 14682 Jalandhar City New Delhi Express covers the distance of 439 kilometres (273 mi) in 8 hours 40 mins (50.65 km/h) and in 9 hours 05 mins as 14681 New Delhi Jalandhar City Express (48.33 km/h).

As the average speed of the train is below 55 km/h (34 mph), as per Indian Railways rules, its fare does not include a Superfast surcharge.

== Rake sharing ==
14682 / 81 Jalandhar City New Delhi Express shares its rake with 12459/60 New Delhi Amritsar Express.

== Routeing ==
The 14682 / 81 Jalandhar City New Delhi Express runs from Jalandhar City via Ghaziabad, Meerut City Jn., Muzaffarnagar, Deoband, Saharanpur, Jagadhri, Ambala Cantt Junction, Ludhiana Junction to New Delhi.

== Traction ==
As this section got electrified in 2016 Ghaziabad based WAP-4 or WAP-5 locomotive powers the train for its entire journey.

== Timings ==
14682 Jalandhar City New Delhi Express leaves Jalandhar City on a daily basis at 04:10 hrs IST and reaches New Delhi at 12:50 hrs IST the same day.

14681 New Delhi Jalandhar City Express leaves New Delhi on a daily basis at 14:45 hrs IST and reaches Jalandhar City at 23:50 hrs IST the same day.
