= Uppal railway station =

Railway station in India

General information
- Location: Kamalapur mandal, Hanumakonda district, Telangana; India
- Coordinates: 18.1825°N 79.4819°E
- Elevation: 251 metres (823 ft)
- System: Indian Railways
- Owner: Indian Railways
- Platforms: 2
- Tracks: 4 (double electrified BG)
- Connections: Bus stand and auto stand

Construction
- Structure type: Standard (on-ground station)

Other information
- Status: Functioning
- Station code: OPL
- Zone(s): South Central Railway
- Division(s): Secunderabad

Services
Superfast and Express and passenger trains
Location

Uppal railway station is in Hanumakonda district, Telangana. Its code is OPL.

It serves Kamalapur and Nadikuda and Parkal mandals of Hanumakonda district and Mulugu and Bhupalpally districts.

Uppal Railway station is situated on Kazipet–Peddapalli section. The station consists of two platforms. From Uppal railway station daily so many passengers travels to their destinations like Secundrabad, peddapally, mancherial etc..It requires some development facilities like displayers on platform for reservation boghi trains and modernisation of main platform and waiting halls.

== Major trains ==
- Kaghaznagar Superfast Express (Reserved)
- Sirpur Kaghaznagar–Secunderabad Intercity Express (Reserved)
- Bhagyanagar Express (Reserved)
- Ramgiri Passenger (unreserved)
- Singareni Passenger (unreserved)
- Peddapalli–Mahbubabad Passenger (unreserved)
- Ajni–Kazipet Passenger (unreserved)..etc
