= Katihar–Patna Intercity Express =

Katihar - Patna Intercity Express
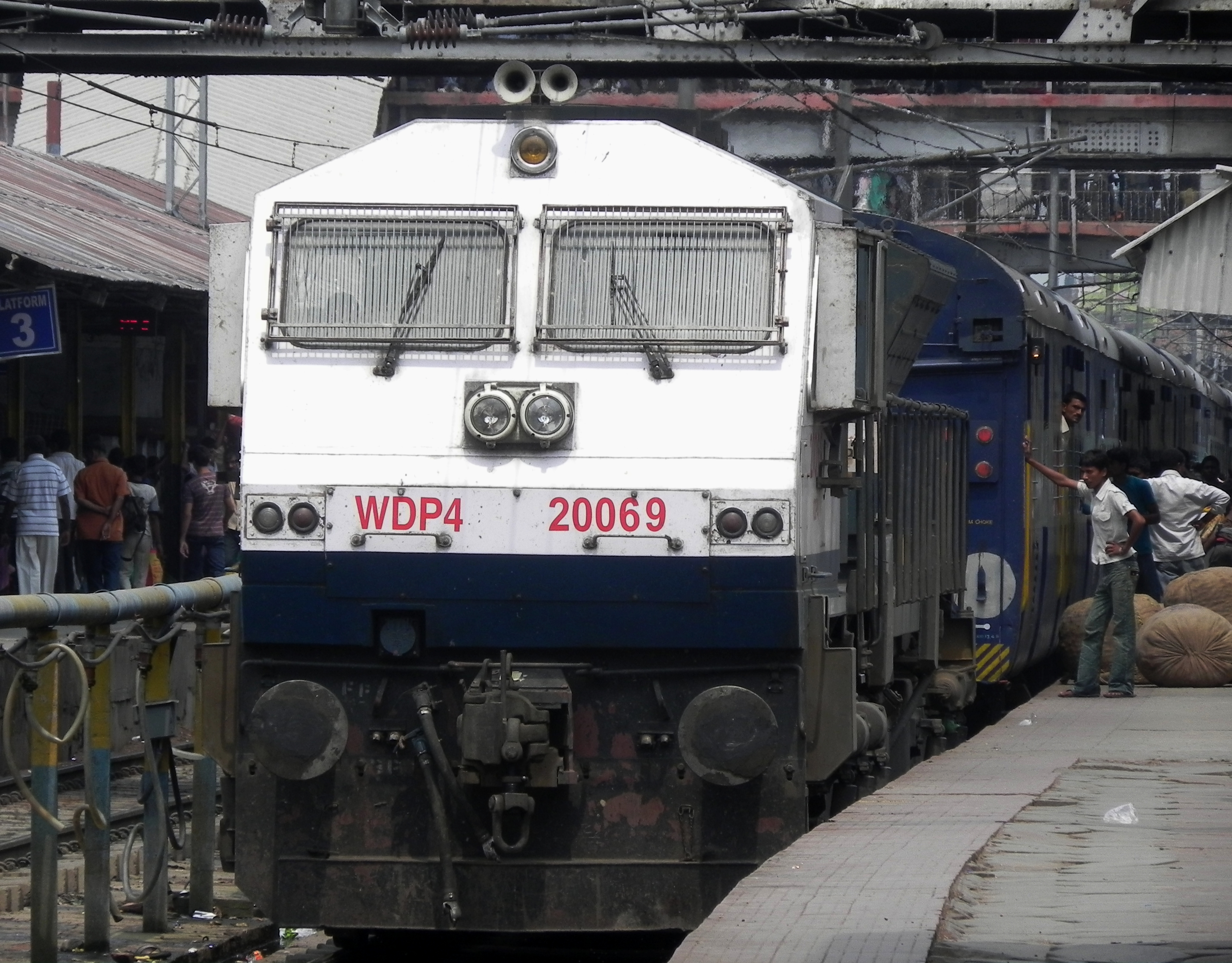
- 15713 (Katihar-Patna) Intercity Express at Chiriyatad, Patna

Overview
- Service type: Express
- Current operator: Northeast Frontier Railway zone

Route
- Termini: Katihar Junction; Patna Junction
- Stops: 12
- Distance travelled: 290 km (180 mi)
- Average journey time: 7 hours 05 mins
- Train number: 15713 / 15714

On-board services
- Seating arrangements: Yes

Technical
- Rolling stock: Standard Indian Railways Coaches
- Track gauge: 1,676 mm (5 ft 6 in)
- Operating speed: 43 km/h (27 mph)
Route map
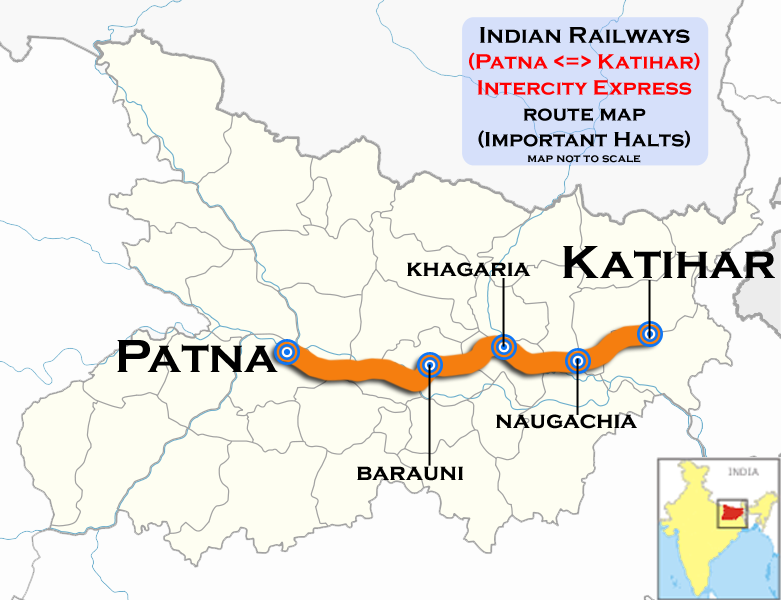

The 15713 / 14 Katihar - Patna Junction Intercity Express is an Express train belonging to Indian Railways Northeast Frontier Railway zone that runs between Katihar Junction and Patna Junction in India.

It operates as train number 15713 from Katihar Junction to Patna Junction and as train number 15714 in the reverse direction serving the states of Bihar.
