= Raipur–Jabalpur Intercity Express =

Train in India

Raipur - Jabalpur Intercity Express
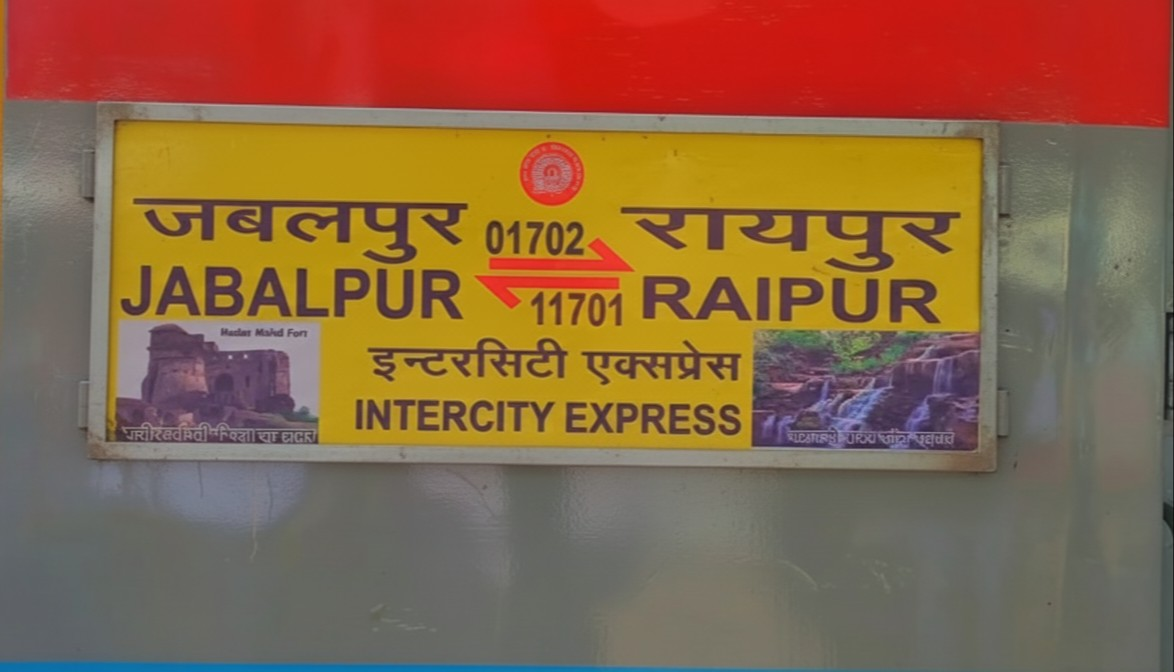

Overview
- Service type: Express
- Status: Active
- Locale: Chhattisgarh, Maharashtra and Madhya Pradesh
- First service: 4 August 2025; 8 months ago
- Current operator: West Central (WCR)

Route
- Termini: Raipur Junction (R); Jabalpur Junction (JBP)
- Stops: 9
- Distance travelled: 408 km (254 mi)
- Average journey time: 8h 0m
- Service frequency: Daily
- Train number: 11701 / 11702

On-board services
- Classes: General Unreserved, AC Reserved Chair Car, AC Chair Car
- Seating arrangements: Yes
- Sleeping arrangements: No
- Catering facilities: No
- Observation facilities: Large windows
- Baggage facilities: No
- Other facilities: Below the seats

Technical
- Rolling stock: LHB coach
- Track gauge: 1,676 mm (5 ft 6 in)
- Electrification: 25 kV 50 Hz AC Overhead line
- Operating speed: 130 km/h (81 mph) maximum, 51 km/h (32 mph) average including halts.
- Track owner: Indian Railways

The 11701 / 11702 Raipur–Jabalpur Intercity Express is an express train belonging to West Central Railway zone that runs between the city Raipur Junction of Chhattisgarh and Jabalpur Junction of Madhya Pradesh in India.

It operates as train number 11701 from Raipur Junction to Jabalpur Junction and as train number 11702 in the reverse direction, serving the states of Madhya Pradesh, Maharashtra and Chhattisgarh.

== Service ==
• 11701/ Raipur–Jabalpur Intercity Express has an average speed of 51 km/h and covers 408 km in 8h 0m.

• 11702/ Jabalpur–Raipur Intercity Express has an average speed of 52 km/h and covers 408 km in 7h 50m.

== Routes and halts ==
The Important Halts of the train are :

● Raipur Junction

● Durg Junction

● Raj Nandgaon

● Dongargarh

● Gondia Junction

● Balaghat Junction

● Nainpur Junction

● Madan Mahal

● Jabalpur Junction

== Schedule ==
• 11701 - Departure from Raipur - 14:45 (Daily)

• 11702 - Departure from Jabalpur - 06:00 (Daily)

== Coach composition ==
1. General Unreserved - 8
2. AC Chair Car - 2
3. AC Reserved Chair - 4

== Traction ==
As the entire route is fully electrified, it is hauled by a Itarsi Loco Shed-based WAP-7 electric locomotive from Raipur to Jabalpur and vice versa.

== Rake reversal ==
The train will reverse 1 time :

1. Gondia Junction

== See also ==
Trains from Raipur Junction :

1. Lucknow–Raipur Garib Rath Express
2. Hasdeo Express

Trains from Jabalpur Junction :

1. Jabalpur–H.Nizamuddin Express
2. Jabalpur–Santragachi Humsafar Express
3. Jabalpur–Somnath Express
4. Jabalpur–Ambikapur Intercity Express
5. Jabalpur–Mumbai CSMT Garib Rath Express

== Notes ==
a. Runs daily in a week with both directions.
