= Varanasi–Gonda Intercity Express =

Varanasi Jn- Bahraich Intercity Express
Overview
- Service type: Express
- First service: 25 January 2011; 15 years ago
- Current operator: Northern Railway

Route
- Termini: Varanasi Junction (BSB); Bahraich (BRK)
- Stops: 15
- Distance travelled: 255 km (158 mi)
- Average journey time: 6h 0m
- Service frequency: Daily (Note: Runs two days in a week for every direction.)
- Train number: 14213/14214

On-board services
- Classes: CC, UR/GEN
- Seating arrangements: Yes
- Sleeping arrangements: No
- Catering facilities: On-board Catering; E-Catering
- Entertainment facilities: No
- Baggage facilities: Yes
- Other facilities: Below the seats

Technical
- Rolling stock: ICF coach
- Track gauge: 1,676 mm (5 ft 6 in)
- Operating speed: 110 km/h (68 mph)

The Varanasi - Gonda Intercity Express is an Express train belonging to Northern Railway zone that runs between Gonda Junction and Varanasi Junction in India. It is currently being operated with 14213/14214 train numbers on a daily basis.

== Service ==
The 14213/Varanasi - Gonda Intercity Express has an average speed of 42 km/h and covers 255 km in 6h. 14214/Gonda - Varanasi Intercity Express has an average speed of 38 km/h and covers 255 km in 6h 45m.

== Route and halts ==
The important halts of the train are:

- Varanasi Junction
- Jaunpur Junction
- Akbarpur Junction
- Ayodhya Junction
- Nawabganj Gonda
- Mankapur Junction
- Gonda Junction

== Coach composite ==
The train has standard ICF rakes with max speed of 110 kmph. The train consists of 10 coaches:

- 1 Chair Car
- 7 General
- 2 SLR

== Traction ==
Both trains are hauled by an Electric Loco Shed, Ghaziabad based Indian locomotive class WAP-5 electric locomotive from Nepalganj Road Railway Station to Varanasi and vice versa.

== Direction Reversal ==
Train Reverses its direction 2 times:

- Mankapur Junction
- Ayodhya Junction

== See also ==
- Varanasi Junction railway station
- Gonda Junction railway station
- Krishak Express
