= New Delhi–Amritsar Intercity Express =

New Delhi Amritsar Express
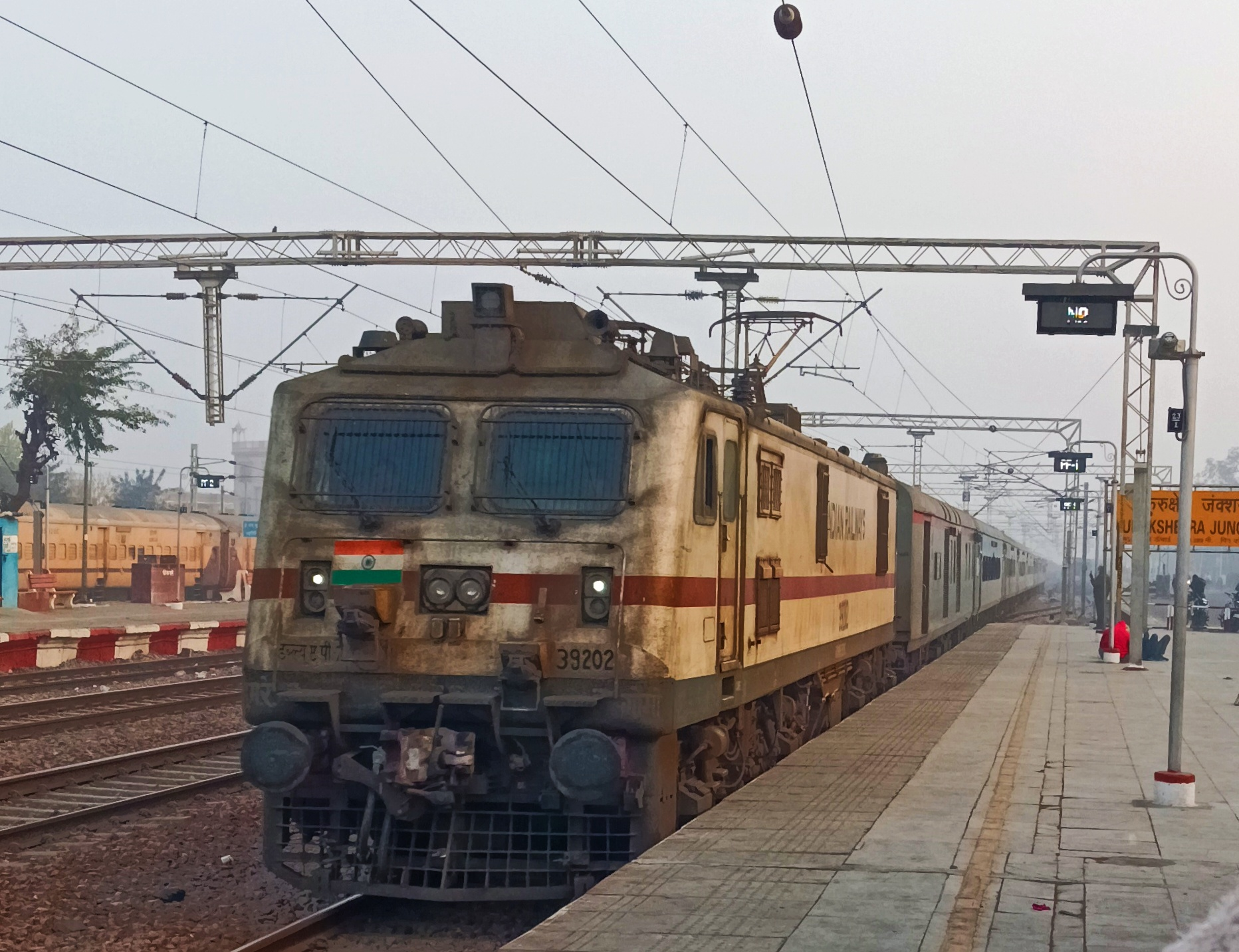

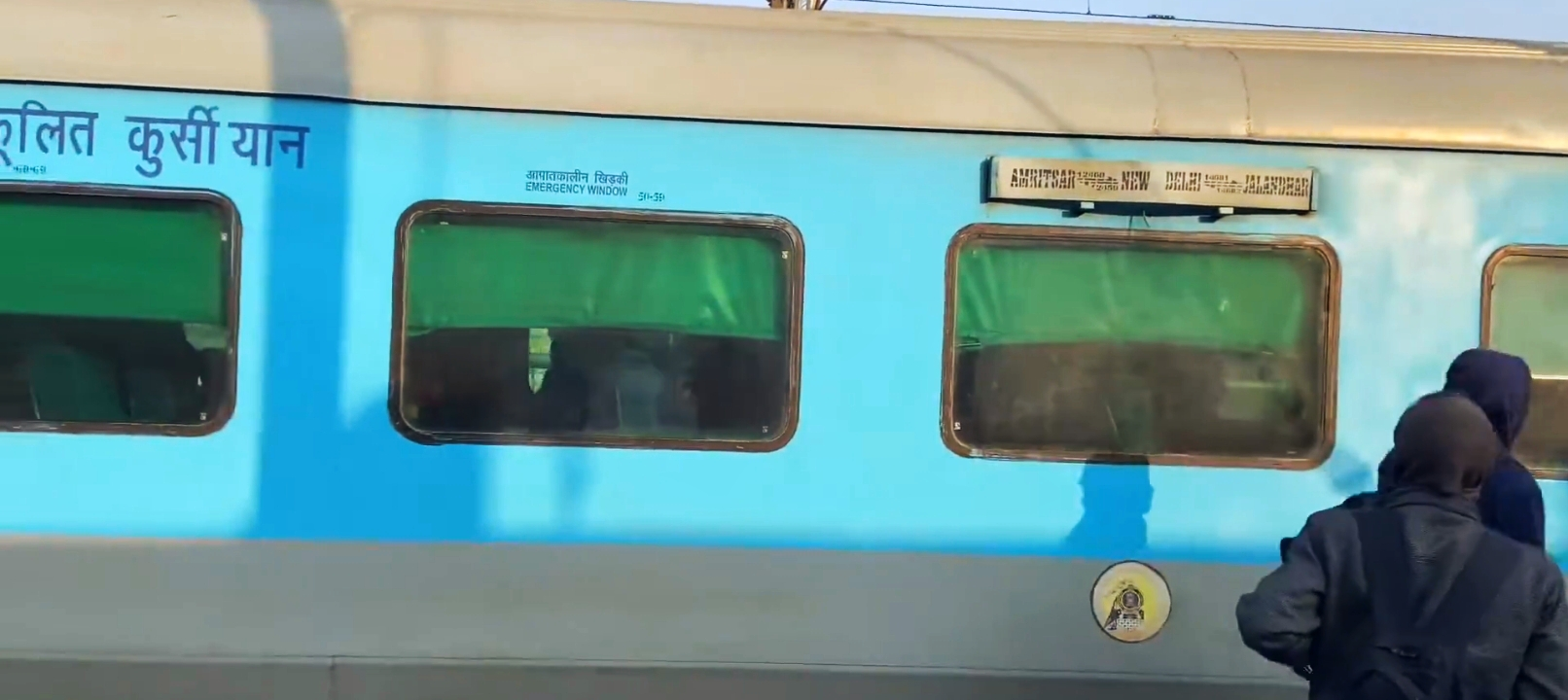
- New Delhi Amritsar Express At Karnal railway station

Overview
- Service type: Superfast Express
- Current operator: Northern Railways

Route
- Termini: New Delhi; Amritsar Junction
- Stops: 13 as 12459 New Delhi Amritsar Express, 15 as 12460 Amritsar New Delhi Express
- Distance travelled: 448 km (278 mi)
- Average journey time: 8 hours 15 minutes as 12459 New Delhi Amritsar Express, 8 hours 00 mins as 12460 Amritsar New Delhi Express
- Service frequency: Daily
- Train number: 12459 / 12460

On-board services
- Classes: AC Chair Car, Second Class seating, General Unreserved
- Seating arrangements: Yes
- Sleeping arrangements: No
- Catering facilities: No Pantry Car Coach attached
- Observation facilities: Rake sharing with 14681 / 82 Jalandhar City New Delhi Express

Technical
- Rolling stock: Standard Indian Railways Coaches
- Track gauge: 1,676 mm (5 ft 6 in)
- Operating speed: 110 km/h (68 mph) maximum,55.14 km/h (34 mph), including halts

The 12459 / 60 New Delhi Amritsar Express is a Superfast Express train belonging to Indian Railways - Northern Railway zone that runs between New Delhi and Amritsar Junction in India.

It operates as train number 12459 from New Delhi to Amritsar Junction and as train number 12460 in the reverse direction serving the states of Delhi, Haryana & Punjab.

== Coaches ==
The 12459 / 60 New Delhi Amritsar Express has 2 AC Car, 13 Second Class seating, 3 General Unreserved and 2 SLR (Seating cum Luggage Rake) Coaches. It does not carry a Pantry car coach.

As is customary with most train services in India, Coach Composition may be amended at the discretion of Indian Railways depending on demand.

== Service ==
The 12459 New Delhi Amritsar Express covers the distance of 448 km (278 mi) in 8 hours 15 mins (54.30 km/h) and in 8 hours 00 mins as 12460 Amritsar New Delhi Express (56.00 km/h).

As the average speed of the train is above 55 km/h (34 mph), as per Indian Railways rules, its fare includes a Superfast surcharge.

== Routeing ==
The 12459 / 60 New Delhi Amritsar Express runs from New Delhi via Ambala Cant Junction, Ludhiana Junction, Jalandhar City to Amritsar Junction.

== Traction ==
As the route is fully electrified, a Ghaziabad based WAP 4 or WAP 5 locomotive powers the train for its entire journey.

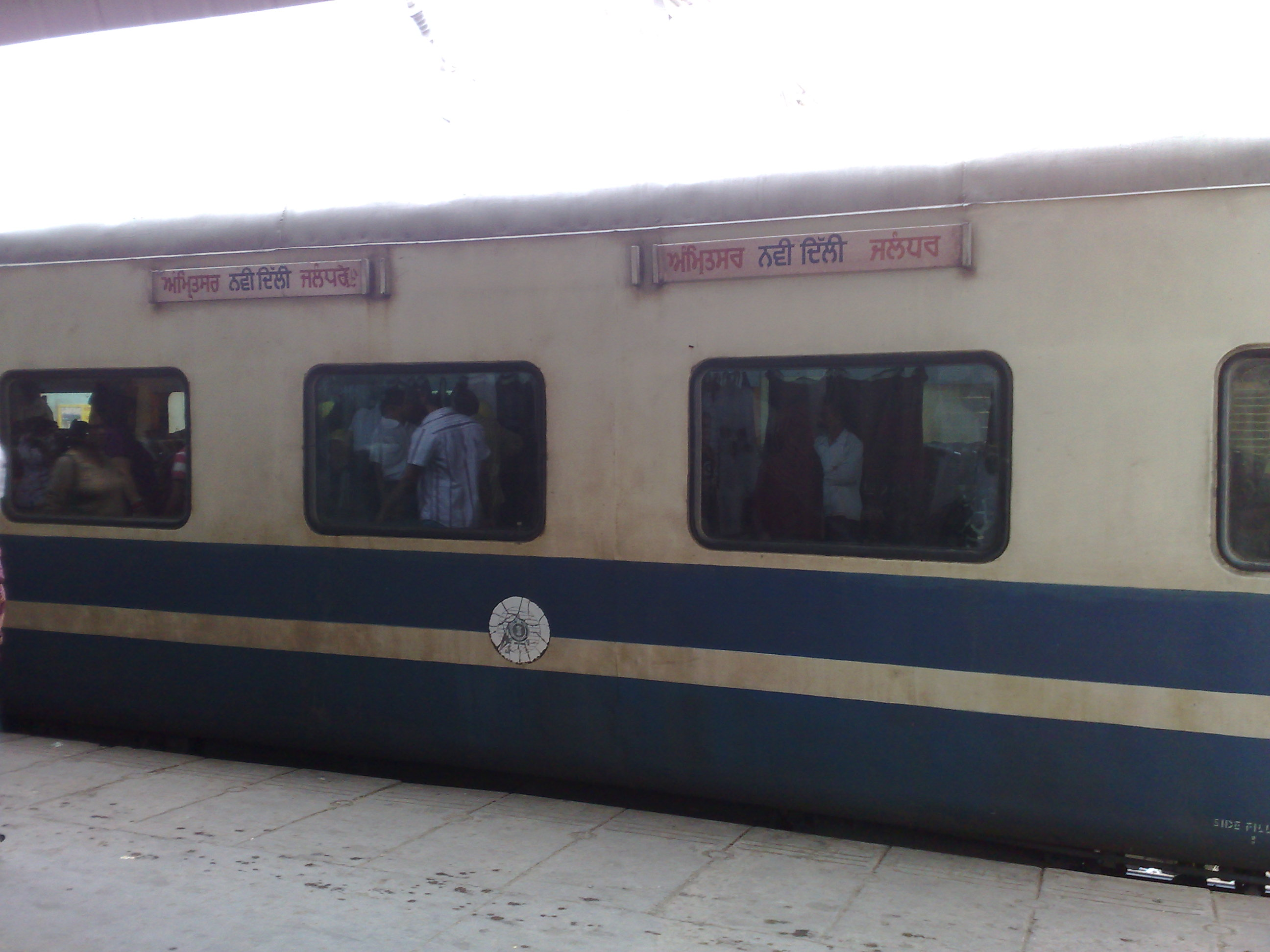
New Delhi Amritsar Express - AC Chair Car

== Timings ==
12459 New Delhi Amritsar Express leaves New Delhi on a daily basis at 13:30 hrs IST and reaches Amritsar Junction at 21:45 hrs IST the same day.

12460 Amritsar New Delhi Express leaves Amritsar Junction on a daily basis at 06:15 hrs IST and reaches New Delhi at 14:15 hrs IST the same day.
