= Chennai–Coimbatore Intercity Express =

Train in India

Coimbatore - Chennai Intercity Express
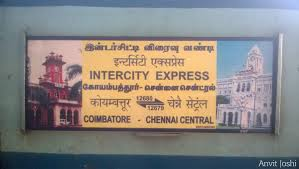
- Intercity Express

Overview
- Service type: Express
- Locale: Tamil Nadu
- First service: 2000
- Current operator(s): Southern Railway

Route
- Termini: Chennai Central; Coimbatore
- Stops: 10
- Distance travelled: 496.8 km (309 mi)
- Average journey time: 7 hours 45 minutes as 12679 Chennai-Coimbatore Intercity Express, 7 hours 35 minutes as 12680 Coimbatore-Chennai Intercity Express
- Service frequency: daily
- Train number(s): 12679 / 12680

On-board services
- Class(es): LHB - 2nd sitting, AC Chair car, General Compartments
- Seating arrangements: Yes
- Sleeping arrangements: No
- Catering facilities: Yes AC Buffet Car
- Baggage facilities: Yes

Technical
- Track gauge: 1,676 mm (5 ft 6 in)
- Electrification: Yes
- Operating speed: 110 km/h (68 mph) maximum 63 km/h (39 mph) including halts
Route map
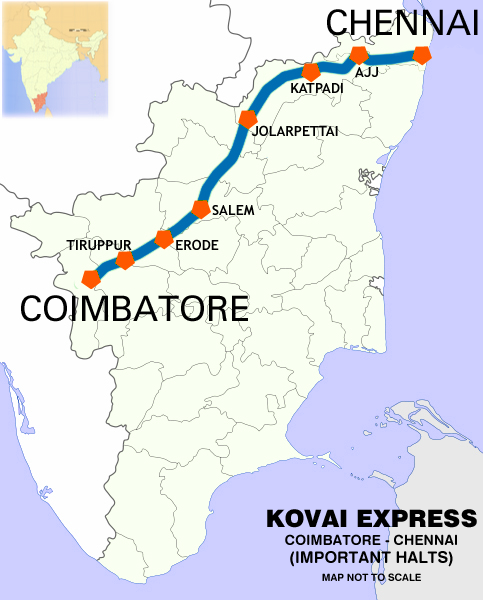

Coimbatore - MGR Chennai Central Intercity Express is a train that runs between Chennai, the state capital of Tamil Nadu and Coimbatore, the second largest city of the state. It replaced erstwhile Chennai Coimbatore Shatabdi Express used to run from 1995 to 2000 and present Chennai Central–Coimbatore Shatabdi Express was not existed then. It is operated by the Southern Railway zone of the Indian Railways. 12679 is departs at 14:35 from Chennai central and arrives at 22:20. in Coimbatore; 12680 departs at 6:20 from Coimbatore and arrives at 13:50 in Chennai Central. The Train was given an Upgrade to LHB Coaches from 23 December 2019.

== Stops ==
Stops for 12680

Station Code	Station Name	Time	Distance	Day
CBE	Coimbatore Junction	6:20 AM (Source)	0	Day 1
TUP	Tiruppur	7:03 AM	51	Day 1
ED	Erode Junction	7:45 AM	101	Day 1
SA	Salem Junction	8:42 AM	164	Day 1
BQI	Bommidi	9:19 AM	207	Day 1
MAP	Morappur	9:38 AM	229	Day 1
JTJ	Jolarpettai Junction	10:33 AM	284	Day 1
AB	Ambur	10:53 AM	315	Day 1
KPD	Katpadi Junction	11:38 AM	367	Day 1
AJJ	Arakkonam Junction	12:28 PM	428	Day 1
PER	Perambur	1:13 PM	491	Day 1
MAS	Chennai Central	1:50 PM (Destination)	496.8	Day 1

Stops for 12679

Station Code	Station Name	Time	Distance	Day
MAS	Chennai Central	2:35 PM (Source)	0	Day 1
AJJ	Arakkonam Junction	3:28 PM	69	Day 1
KPD	Katpadi Junction	4:13 PM	130	Day 1
AB	Ambur	4:48 PM	182	Day 1
JTJ	Jolarpettai Junction	5:28 PM	214	Day 1
MAP	Morappur	6:09 PM	268	Day 1
BQI	Bommidi	6:29 PM	290	Day 1
SA	Salem Junction	7:12 PM	334	Day 1
ED	Erode Junction	8:10 PM	396	Day 1
TUP	Tiruppur	8:58 PM	446	Day 1
CBF	Coimbatore North	9:39 PM	494	Day 1
CBE	Coimbatore Junction	10:20 PM (Destination)	496.8	Day 1
