= Delhi Sarai Rohilla–Firozpur Intercity Express =

Indian train route

Delhi Sarai Rohilla – Firozpur Cantonment Intercity Express
Overview
- Service type: Express
- First service: 9 August 2013; 12 years ago
- Current operator: Northern Railway zone

Route
- Termini: Delhi Sarai Rohilla; Firozpur Cantonment
- Stops: 14
- Distance travelled: 381 km (237 mi)
- Average journey time: 7 hours 55 mins
- Service frequency: Daily
- Train number: 14625 / 14626

On-board services
- Classes: AC 2 Tier, AC 3 Tier, Sleeper Class, general unreserved,
- Seating arrangements: Yes
- Sleeping arrangements: No
- Catering facilities: No
- Observation facilities: Rake Sharing with 14623/14624 Patalkot Express

Technical
- Rolling stock: Standard Indian Railways Coaches
- Track gauge: 1,676 mm (5 ft 6 in)
- Operating speed: 50.5 km/h (31 mph)

The 14625 / 26 Delhi Sarai Rohilla – Firozpur Cantonment Intercity Express is an Express train belonging to Indian Railways Northern Railway zone that runs between Delhi Sarai Rohilla and Firozpur Cantonment in India.

It operates as train number 14625 from Delhi Sarai Rohilla to Firozpur Cantonment and as train number 14626 in the reverse direction serving the states of Haryana & Delhi.

== Coaches ==
The 14625 / 26 Delhi Sarai Rohilla – Firozpur Cantonment Intercity Express has one AC 2 Tier, one AC 3 Tier, five sleeper class, six general unreserved & two SLR (seating with luggage rake) coaches . It does not carry a pantry car coach.

As is customary with most train services in India, coach composition may be amended at the discretion of Indian Railways depending on demand.

== Service ==
The 14625 Delhi Sarai Rohilla – Firozpur Cantonment Intercity Express covers the distance of 381 km (237 mi) in 7 hours 50 mins (49 km/h) and in 7 hours 20 mins as the 14626 Firozpur Cantonment – Delhi Sarai Rohilla Intercity Express (52 km/h).

As the average speed of the train is less than 55 km/h (34 mph), as per railway rules, its fare doesn't includes a Superfast surcharge.

== Routing ==
The 14625 / 26 Delhi Sarai Rohilla – Firozpur Cantonment Intercity Express runs from Delhi Sarai Rohilla via Rohtak Junction, Jind Junction, Jakhal Junction, Bathinda Junction to Firozpur Cantonment.

== Traction ==
As the route is going to be electrified, a Bathinda Junction based WDM-3A diesel locomotive pulls the train to its destination.
