= Benti, Uttar Pradesh =

Benti
- Location of Benti in Uttar Pradesh Benti (India)
- Coordinates: 25.91609°N 81.86073°E
- Country: India
- State: Uttar Pradesh
- District: Pratapgarh

Government
  - Type: Gram Sabha
  - Village Chief: Manorama Devi
- Elevation: 110 m (360 ft)
- Time zone: UTC+5:30 (Indian Standard Time)
- Postal Code: 230204
- Telephone Code: 05341
- Vehicle Registration: UP 72

Benti is a village in Kunda tehsil of Pratapgarh district in the Indian state of Uttar Pradesh. The village is located on the bank of river Ganges and near by village Bhadri.

== Geography ==
Benti's evaluation is about 110 metres (360 ft) above sea level. It is situated on the bank of the Ganges River, with Bihar towards the east, Kara tehsil towards the west, and Babaganj towards the north.

The district headquarters at Pratapgarh lie 54 kilometres (34 mi) to the west, while the state capital at Lucknow is 160 kilometres (99 mi) distant.

== Baba Bhimrao Ambedkar Sanctuary ==
Baba Bhimrao Ambedkar Sanctuary, or Benti Lake, is located in Benti. The lake, which covers more than 1,000 acres (400 ha), was designated as a bird sanctuary by the Kumari Mayawati government in 2003.

== Demographics ==
Per the 2011 Census of India, Benti has a total population of 10146; 5268 of whom are male and 4878 female.

== Transport ==
Kunda Harnamgnj railway station and Bhadri railway station are the very nearby railway stations to Benti. However, Allahabad Junction is a major railway station 48 kilometres (30 mi) from Benti.
