= Nande =

Village in Maharashtra

- Village
- Interactive map of Nande
- Location in Maharashtra, India Location in India
- Coordinates: 18°33′29″N 73°42′53″E
- Country: India
- State: Maharashtra
- District: Pune
- Tehsil (taluka): Mulshi

Government
  - Type: Panchayati raj (India)
  - Body: Gram panchayat

Languages
  - Official: Marathi
  - Other spoken: Hindi
- Time zone: UTC+5:30 (IST)
- Telephone code: 02114
- ISO 3166 code: IN-MH
- Vehicle registration: MH-14
- Website: pune.nic.in

Nande is a village situated on a south bank of the Mula River to the west of the City of Pune in Mulshi taluka, Pune District, Maharashtra State, India, with a majority Marathi Muslim population. The nearest village is Chande, located about 1.2 km to the west, reachable via the east–west Sus road, the only road to cross through Nande. The Balewadi–Nande road from the northeast and a northbound offshoot of the Paud road from the south both merge into the Sus road in Nande. By road, other nearby settlements include Mulkhed (4.2 km southwest), Maan (5.1 km north), and Pirangut (7.9 km southwest), and nearby neighborhoods of Pune include Sus (4.3 km east) and Hinjawadi (9.5 km northeast). The railway stations nearest to the village are Vadgaon railway station, Begdewadi railway station, Lonavala railway station, Talegaon railway station and Kamshet railway station.
