= Pirangut =

- Census town
- Nickname: priyanguvat
- Location in Maharashtra, India Pirangut (India)
- Coordinates: 18.5115°N 73.6801°E
- Country: India
- State: Maharashtra
- District: Pune

Population (2011)
  - Total: 14,174

Languages
  - Official: Marathi
- Time zone: UTC+5:30 (IST)
- Postal code: 412115

Pirangut is a census town in Mulshi taluka of Pune district in the Indian state of Maharashtra.

== Demographics ==
Pirangut, had a population of 14174. Males constitute 52% of the population and females 48%. Bhare (1 KM), Kasaramboli (3 KM), Mulkhed (4 KM), Lavale (4 KM) are the nearby Villages to Pirangut.

== Industry ==
There is an industrial park established by MIDC in the town where many manufacturing and processing companies are located. Most of these are located near Ghotawade Phata. Some of the prominent companies include Vulkan Technologies, Bobst India, Randack Fasteners, Phoenix Mecano India, Nalco India, and Champ Energy Ventures.

== Transport ==
Pirangut is well connected by PMPML buses which goes to Mulshi, Paud, Belawade, Kashig, Bhadas Bk., Bhugaon, Kothrud, Swargate, Deccan Gymkhana, Chinchwad, Thergaon, Shri Chhatrapati Shivaji Market Yard, Katar Khadak, Hinjawadi, Wakad, Dange Chowk
