= Mulshi (disambiguation) =

Mulshi is a village and an administrative block in Pune district, Maharashtra, India.

Mulshi may also refer to:

- Mulshi Kh., a village in Pune district, Maharashtra, India
- Mulshi Dam, a dam on the Mula River in Pune district, Maharashtra, India
- Mulshi taluka, an administrative division of the Pune district, Maharashtra, India
