= Chale, Mulshi =

Village in Maharashtra, India

Chale
- Village
- Location in Maharashtra, India Chale (India)
- Country: India
- State: Maharashtra
- District: Pune
- Tehsil: Mulshi

Government
  - Type: Panchayati raj (India)
  - Body: Gram panchayat

Population (2011)
  - Total: 828

Languages
  - Official: Marathi
  - Other spoken: Hindi
- Time zone: UTC+5:30 (IST)
- Telephone code: 02114
- ISO 3166 code: IN-MH
- Vehicle registration: MH-14
- Website: pune.nic.in

Chale is a village in Mulshi taluka, of Pune District in the Indian state of Maharashtra. It is surrounded by the Four Talukas of Karjat, Talegaon Dabhade, Mawal and Khalapur. The Districts closest to the village are Raigad district, Thane district, Mumbai City district and the Mumbai Suburban district. The nearest railway stations to the village are Vadgaon, Begdewadi, Lonavala, Talegaon and Kamshet. Its population was 828 in 2011.
