= Kasarsai =

- Village
- Location in PUNE, MAHARASHTRA, INDIA Kasarsai (India)
- Country: India
- State: Maharashtra
- District: Pune
- Tehsil: Mulshi

Government
  - Type: Municipal Corporation
  - Body: PMRDA www.pmrda.gov.in

Languages
  - Official: Marathi
- Time zone: UTC+5:30 (IST)
- Telephone code: 411057
- ISO 3166 code: IN-MH
- Vehicle registration: MH-14
- Website: pune.nic.in

Kasarsai is in Mulshi taluka of Pune District in the state of Maharashtra, India. Talukas surrounding Kasarsai are Karjat taluka, Talegaon Dabhade Taluka, Mawal taluka and by Khalapur taluka. Districts closest to the kasarsai are Raigad district, Thane district, Mumbai City district and Mumbai Suburban district. Nearest railway stations around Kasarsai are Vadgaon railway station, Begdewadi railway station, Lonavala railway station, Talegaon railway station and Kamshet railway station.
