= Watunde =

Village in Maharashtra

- Village
- Country: India
- State: Maharashtra
- District: Pune
- Tehsil: Mulshi

Government
  - Type: Panchayati raj (India)
  - Body: Gram panchayat

Languages
  - Official: Marathi
- Time zone: UTC+5:30 (IST)
- Telephone code: 02114
- ISO 3166 code: IN-MH
- Vehicle registration: MH-14
- Website: pune.nic.in

Watunde is a village in Mulshi taluka of Pune district in the state of Maharashtra, India. It is on the Temghar-Lavasa Road about 40 km west of Pune and 23.8 km east of Lavasa, close to several camping grounds and nature resorts including Amrutvel Resort, Amber Hills Resort & Camping, Camp Temgarh Resort, Gharkul Agri Tourism, and Aranyavan Resort. It is also close to Ananda Kriya Yogashram, a meditation and yoga retreat center.

Other talukas in the vicinity of the village are Karjat taluka, Talegaon Dabhade taluka, Mawal taluka, and Khalapur taluka. Other districts closest to the village are Raigad district, Thane district, Mumbai City district, and Mumbai Suburban district.

Rail stations nearest to the village are Vadgaon railway station, Begdewadi railway station, Lonavala railway station, Talegaon railway station, and Kamshet railway station.
