= Chandivali, Mulshi =

Village in Maharashtra, India

Chandivali
- Village
- Location in Maharashtra, India Chandivali (India)
- Country: India
- State: Maharashtra
- District: Pune
- Tehsil: Mulshi

Government
  - Type: Panchayati raj (India)
  - Body: Gram panchayat

Languages
  - Official: Marathi
  - Other spoken: Hindi
- Time zone: UTC+5:30 (IST)
- Telephone code: 02114
- ISO 3166 code: IN-MH
- Vehicle registration: MH-14
- Website: pune.nic.in

Chandivali is a village in Mulshi taluka of Pune district in the state of Maharashtra, India. Talukas surrounding the village are Karjat, Talegaon Dabhade, Mawal and Khalapur. Districts closest to the village are Raigad, Thane, Mumbai City and Mumbai Suburban.

The nearest railway stations are Vadgaon, Begdewadi, Lonavala, Talegaon and Kamshet.
