= Darawali =

Village in Maharashtra

- Village
- Location in Maharashtra, India Darawali (India)
- Country: India
- State: Maharashtra
- District: Pune
- Tehsil: Mulshi

Government
  - Type: Panchayati raj (India)
  - Body: Gram panchayat

Languages
  - Official: Marathi
  - Other spoken: Hindi
- Time zone: UTC+5:30 (IST)
- Telephone code: 02114
- ISO 3166 code: IN-MH
- Vehicle registration: MH-14
- Website: pune.nic.in

Darawali is a village in Mulshi taluka of Pune District in the state of Maharashtra, India. The village is surrounded by Karjat taluka, Talegaon Dabhade Taluka, Mawal taluka and Khalapur taluka. The closest districts are Raigad district, Thane district, Mumbai City district and Mumbai Suburban district. The nearest railway stations are Vadgaon railway station, Begdewadi railway station, Lonavala railway station, Talegaon railway station and Kamshet railway station.
