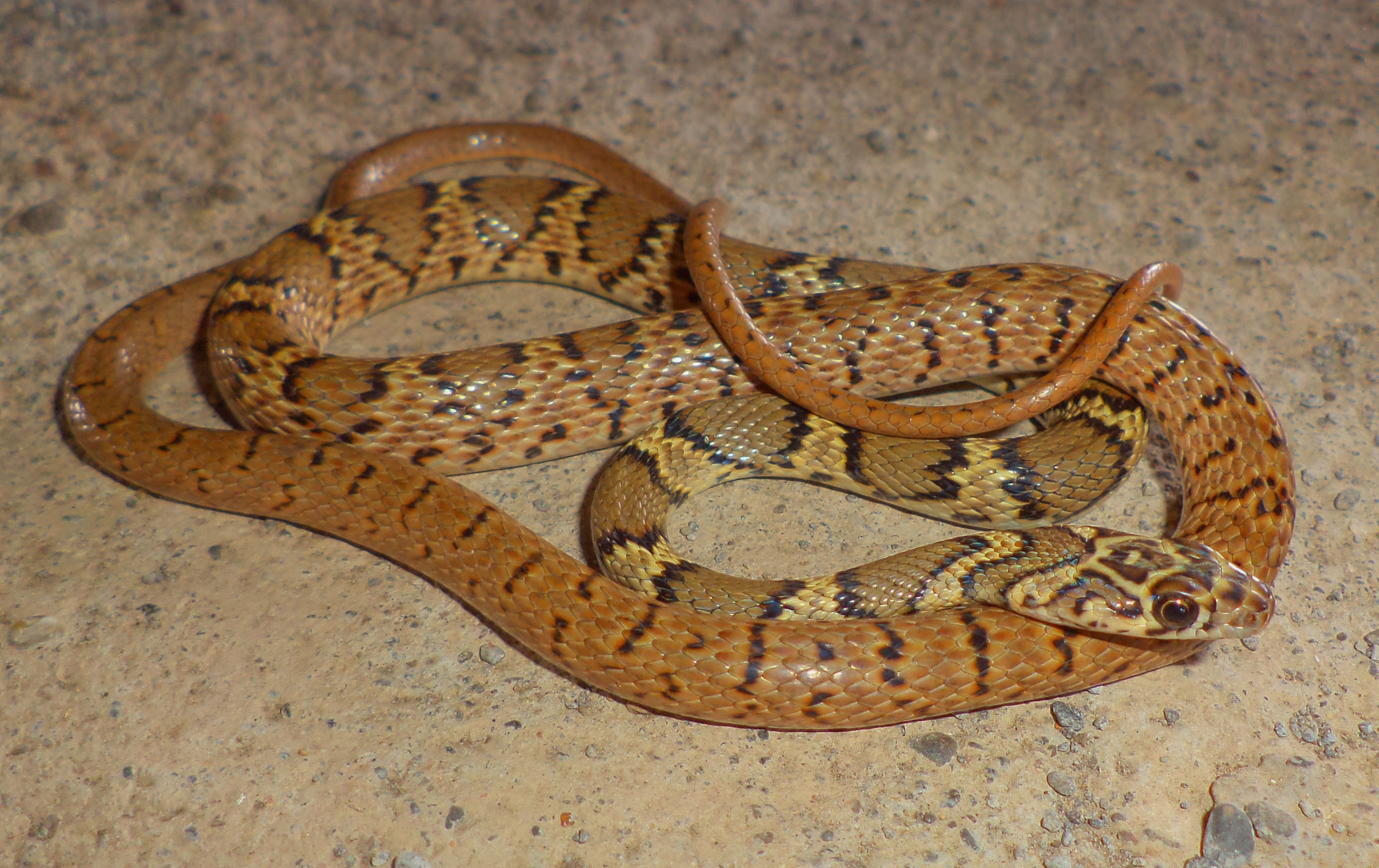

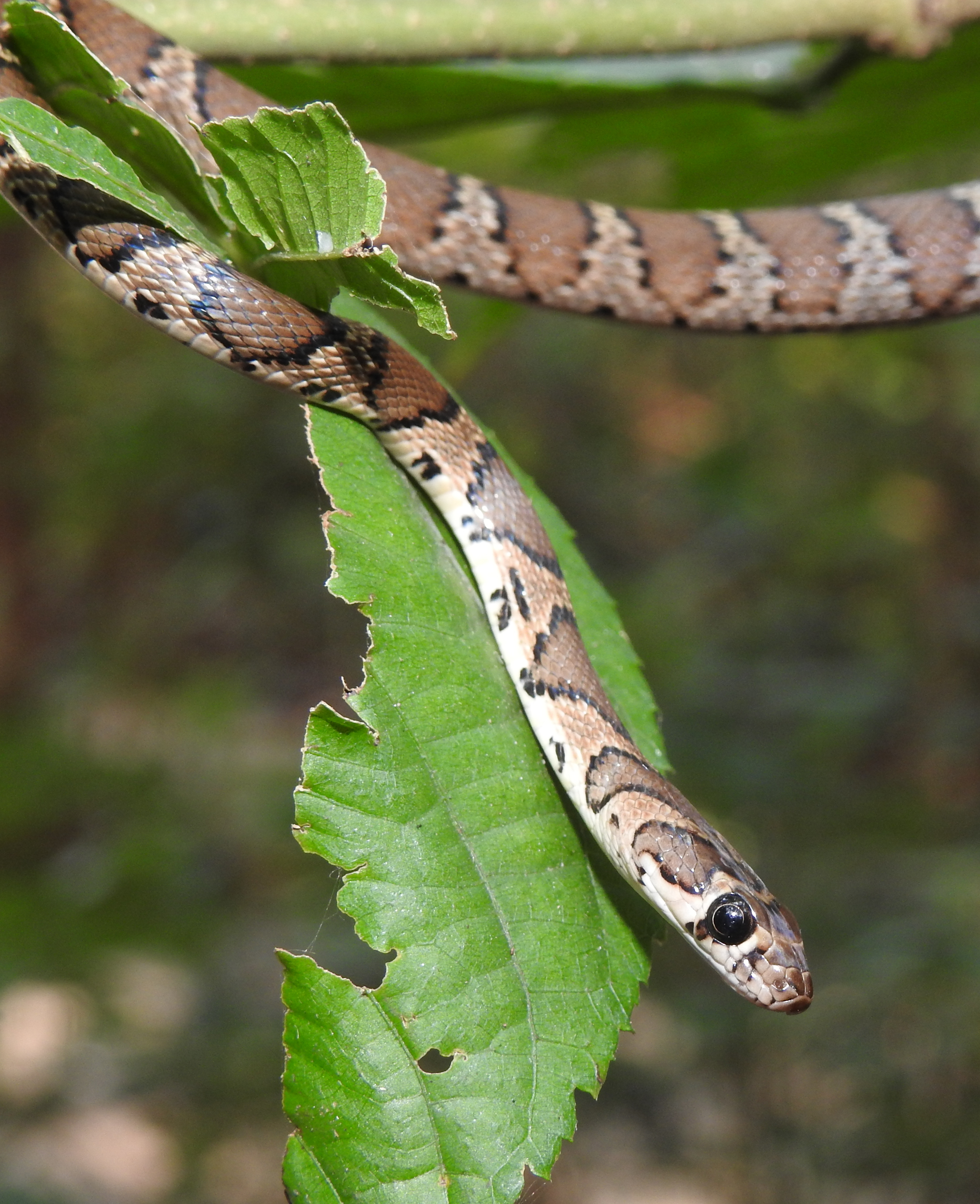
- Lower photo: Dr. Raju Kasambe, BNHS Conservation Education Centre, Goregaon, Mumbai, India.

Conservation status
- Data Deficient (IUCN 3.1)

Scientific classification
- Kingdom: Animalia
- Phylum: Chordata
- Class: Reptilia
- Order: Squamata
- Suborder: Serpentes
- Family: Colubridae
- Genus: Platyceps
- Species: P. gracilis

Binomial name
- Platyceps gracilis (Günther, 1862)
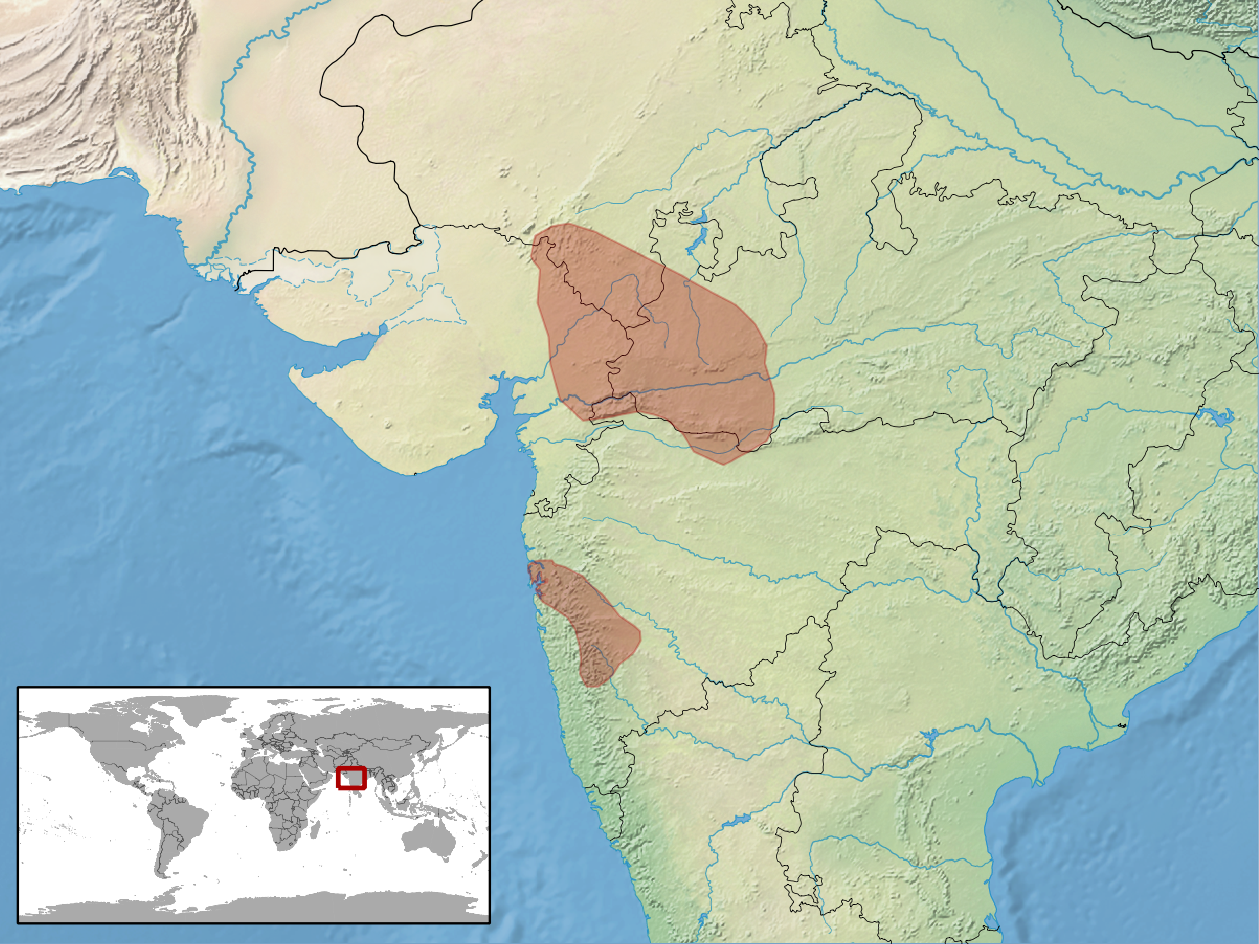

Synonyms
- Zamenis gracilis Günther, 1862; Tyria gracilis — Cope, 1862; Coluber gracilis — M.A. Smith, 1943; Argyrogena gracilis — Sharma, 2004; Platyceps gracilis — Wallach et al., 2014

= Platyceps gracilis =

Species of snake

Platyceps gracilis, commonly known as the graceful racer or slender racer, is a species of snake endemic to West India.

== Description ==
See snake scales for terms used

Snout is obtuse; rostral nearly as deep as broad, just visible from above; suture between the internasals a little shorter than that between the prefrontals; frontal slightly longer than its distance from the end of the snout, nearly as long as the occipitals; loreal nearly as deep as long; one preocular, with a small subocular below 3 two postoculars; temporals 2+2; 9 upper labials, fifth and sixth entering the eye; 4 or 5 lower labials in contact with the anterior chin-shields; posterior chin-shields as long as or longer than the anterior, separated anteriorly by two scales. Scales smooth, in 21 rows. Ventrals ungulate laterally, 213–228; anal divided; subcaudals 118–121. Yellowish above, with a series of large round brown spots edged with black, separated by narrow interspaces; these spots become more indistinct on the posterior part of the body; a black cross-band on the snout and three angular dark brown black-edged bands on the head, the anterior between the eye, the posterior extending on to the nape; lower parts yellowish, with an irregular series of black spots on each side. Total length 33 inches; tail 10.

== Distribution ==
P. gracilis is endemic to the West of India, and has been sighted in the states of Gujarat and Madhya Pradesh. According to observations documented via iNaturalist, the species has been seen in the areas of Dhalewadi, Dhule, Kondhur, Matheran, Mumbai, Pune and Thane (Kalwa) in Maharashtra; in Rajasthan, it is known from Chittorgarh and Udaipur.
