= Chande, Mulshi =

Village in Maharashtra

Chande
- Village
- Location in Maharashtra, India Chande (India)
- Country: India
- State: Maharashtra
- District: Pune
- Tehsil: Mulshi

Government
  - Type: Panchayati raj (India)
  - Body: Gram panchayat

Languages
  - Official: Marathi
  - Other spoken: Hindi
- Time zone: UTC+5:30 (IST)
- Telephone code: 02114
- ISO 3166 code: IN-MH
- Vehicle registration: MH-14
- Website: pune.nic.in

Chande is a village in Mulshi taluka of Pune District in the state of Maharashtra, India. It is surrounded by Karjat taluka, Talegaon Dabhade Taluka, Mawal taluka and Khalapur taluka. The districts closest to the village are Raigad district, Thane district, Mumbai City district and Mumbai Suburban district. The railway stations nearest the village are Vadgaon railway station, Begdewadi railway station, Lonavala railway station, Talegaon railway station and Kamshet railway station.
