= Male, Mulshi =

Village in Maharashtra

Male Male
- Village
- Location in Maharashtra, India Male (India)
- Coordinates: 18°31′33″N 73°31′25″E
- Country: India
- State: Maharashtra
- District: Pune
- Tehsil: Bhor

Government
  - Type: Panchayati raj (India)
  - Body: Gram panchayat
- Elevation: 616.87 m (2,023.9 ft)

Languages
  - Official: Marathi
  - Other spoken: Hindi
- Time zone: UTC+5:30 (IST)
- Telephone code: 02114
- ISO 3166 code: IN-MH
- Vehicle registration: MH-14
- Website: pune.nic.in

Male is a village in Mulshi taluka of Pune District in the state of Maharashtra, India. Talukas surrounding the village are Rajagad Taluka, Mawal taluka and Khalapur taluka. Districts closest to the village are Raigad district, Thane district, Mumbai City district and Mumbai Suburban district. Nearest railway stations around the village are Vadgaon and Kamshet.
