= Kondhur =

Village in Maharashtra

Coordinates: 19°34′N 77°19′E

- Village
- Location in Maharashtra, India Kondhur (India)
- Country: India
- State: Maharashtra
- District: Pune
- Tehsil: Mulshi

Government
  - Type: Panchayati raj (India)
  - Body: Gram panchayat

Languages
  - Official: Marathi
  - Other spoken: Hindi
- Time zone: UTC+5:30 (IST)
- Telephone code: 02114
- ISO 3166 code: IN-MH
- Vehicle registration: MH-12
- Website: pune.nic.in

Kondhur is a village in Mulshi taluka of Pune District in the state of Maharashtra, India. Talukas surrounding the village are Karjat taluka, Talegaon Dabhade Taluka, Mawal taluka and by Khalapur taluka. Districts closest to the village are Raigad district, Thane district, Mumbai City district and Mumbai Suburban district. Nearest railway stations around the village are Vadgaon railway station, Begdewadi railway station, Lonavala railway station, Talegaon railway station and Kamshet railway station.
