= Girivan =

Hill Station

Girivan is a private hill station in Hotale village near Kolvan of Mulshi taluka of Pune Maharashtra. It is approximately at 2400 feet above sea level and 400 feet above the Lonavala hill station, making the climate is cool and refreshing. There are many private resorts. Accommodation facilities are available. One can also go trekking. Best time to visit is during Rainy or Winter season. Native plants and trees, many of them having medicinal value, are retained.

== Going to Girivan ==
- Deccan Gymkhana Pune - 40 km.
- Mumbai-via Dadar-Kamshet-Girivan - 131 km.
