= Bhoirwadi =

Village in Maharashtra

Bhoirwadi (Hinjawadi Phase-III)
- Pune Metropolitan Region
- Location in Maharashtra, India
- Coordinates: 18.594596°N 73.718519°E
- Country: India
- State: Maharashtra
- District: Pune
- Taluka: Mulshi

Government
  - Body: Gram Panchayat

Languages
  - Official: Marathi
- Time zone: UTC+5:30 (IST)
- PIN: 411057
- Telephone code: 91-(0)-20
- Vehicle registration: MH-14

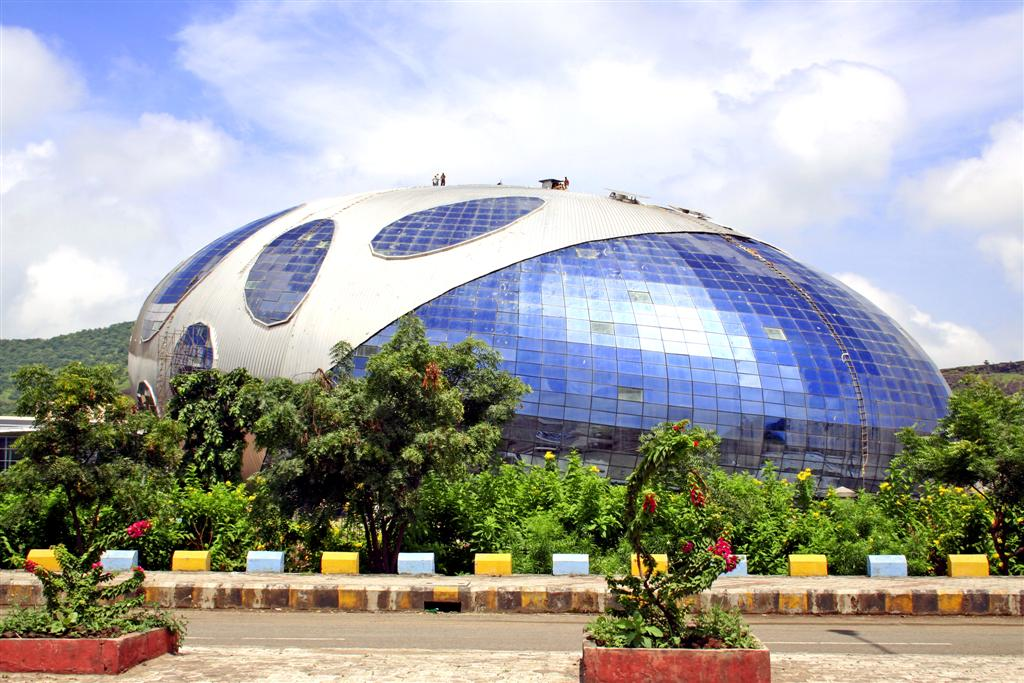
Infosys, Hinjawadi Phase-2

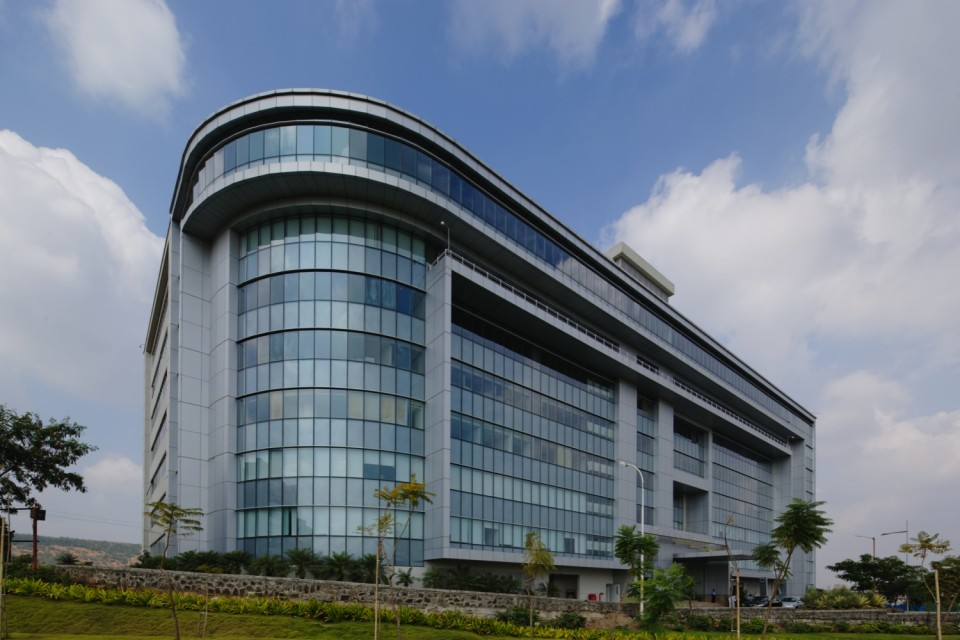
Embassy Tech Zone, Hinjawadi Phase-2

Bhoirwadi is an area located in Hinjawadi Phase-3, Pune, in the state of Maharashtra, India. It is under the jurisdiction of Hinjawadi and Pune Metropolitan Region Development Authority (PMRDA). The Rajiv Gandhi Infotech Park Phase-3 and International Tech Park are located in this area. Bhoirwadi is well connected and near Balewadi, Baner, Aundh, Pune. Bhoirwadi used to be a village, but now it has been drastically transformed into an affluent, developed area with multinational companies and residential high-rises.

== Economy ==
Companies situated here include Tata Consultancy Services, Capgemini, Infosys, Congnigent and Tech Mahindra. International Tech Park is a 25-acre global IT park located in Bhoirwadi. This location is classified as an IT/ITES Special Economic Zone (SEZ).

== Transportation ==
=== Bhoirwadi (Megapolis Circle) Hinjawadi Line-3 Pune Metro Railways ===
Metro Railway: Pink Line (Pune Metro)- Bhoirwadi has been connected with Metro Railway through Megapolis Circle Station. The Hinjawadi Metro is under construction; it goes through Bhoirwadi up to Megapolis Circle.

=== Bhoirwadi Bus Transport ===
Air-conditioned bus services are provided for the commuters of Hinjawadi, Maan and Bhoirwadi. Non-air-conditioned buses are also available.
