= Kolavade =

Village in Maharashtra

- Village
- Location in Maharashtra, India Kolavade (India)
- Country: India
- State: Maharashtra
- District: Pune
- Tehsil: Mulshi

Government
  - Type: Panchayati raj (India)
  - Body: Gram panchayat

Languages
  - Official: Marathi
  - Other spoken: No
- Time zone: UTC+5:30 (IST)
- Telephone code: 02114
- ISO 3166 code: IN-MH
- Vehicle registration: MH-14
- Website: pune.nic.in

Kolavade is a village in Mulshi taluka of Pune District in the state of Maharashtra, India.Talukas surrounding the village are Velhe taluka, Lavasa City, Temghar dam Taluka, Mawal taluka and by Bhor taluka. Districts closest to the village are Raigad district, Thane district, Mumbai City district and Mumbai Suburban district. Nearest railway stations around the village are Shivaji Nagar railway station, Pune railway station, Lonavala railway station, Talegaon railway station and Kamshet railway station.
