= Ambadwet =

Village in Maharashtra

- Village
- Location within Maharashtra Location within India
- Coordinates: 18.531°N 73.662°E
- Tehsil: Mulshi
- District: Pune
- State: Maharashtra
- Country: India
- Postal code: 425410

Ambadwet is a village situated near the banks of the Mula river, Taluka Mulshi, Pune district, India. Mahindra Conveyor Systems, a subdivision of the Indian automobile manufacturer Mahindra & Mahindra, has a facility of manufacturing material handling equipment like conveyor belts in this village.
