= Bhambarde =

Village in Maharashtra

- Village
- Location in Maharashtra, India Bhambarde (India)
- Country: India
- State: Maharashtra
- District: Pune
- Tehsil: Shirur

Government
  - Type: Panchayati raj (India)
  - Body: Gram panchayat

Languages
  - Official: Marathi
  - Other spoken: Hindi
- Time zone: UTC+5:30 (IST)
- Telephone code: 02138
- ISO 3166 code: IN-MH
- Vehicle registration: MH-12
- Website: pune.nic.in

Bhambarde is a village in Shirur taluka of Pune District in the state of Maharashtra, India. Village surrounding the village are Ranjangaon Ganpati, Babhulsar Khurd, Karegaon, Karanjavane, Dahiwadi.
