= Mulshi taluka =

- Tehsil
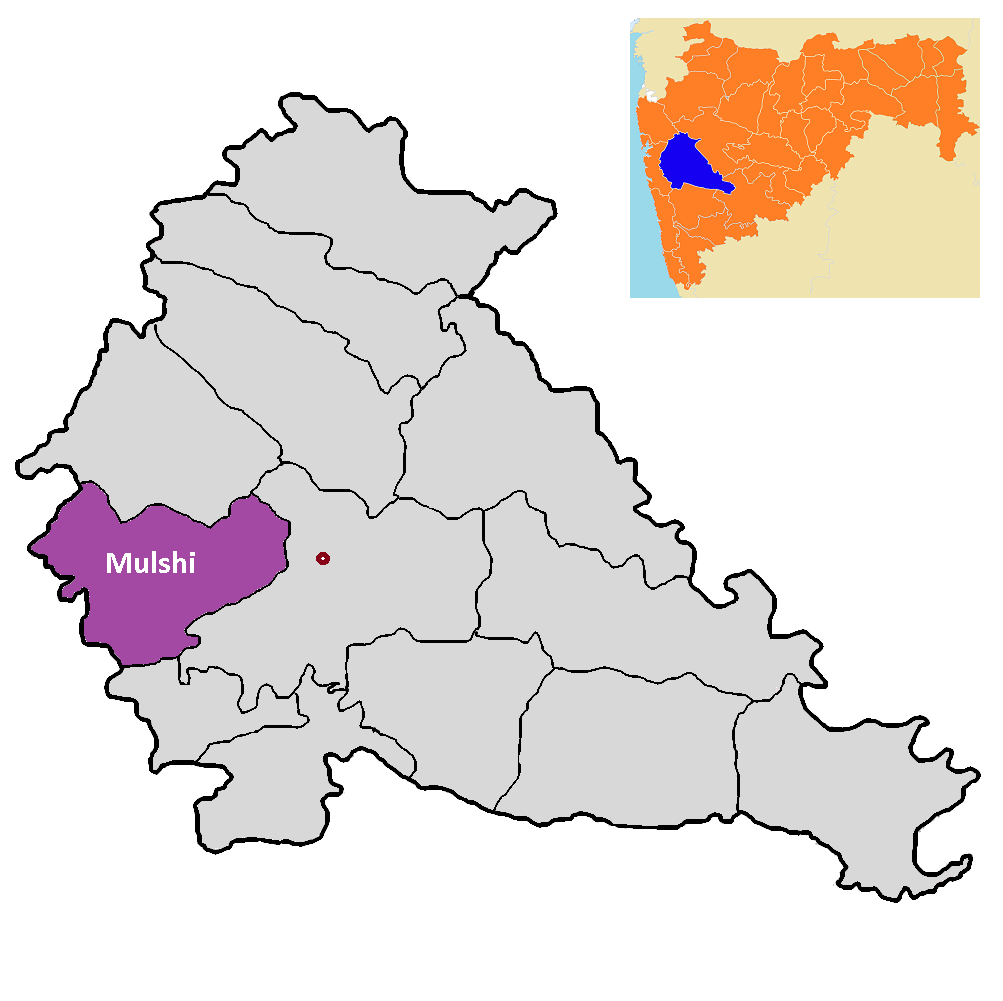
- Location of Mulshi in Pune district in Maharashtra
- Country: India
- State: Maharashtra
- District: Pune

Government
  - Baramati Loksabha: Supriya Sule

Population (2011)
  - Tehsil: 171,006
  - Urban: 25,633

Taluka Mulshi is a taluka in Maval subdivision of Pune district of state of Maharashtra in India. Mulshi consists of Pune Metropolitan Region & Villages.

== Demographics ==
Religions in Mulshi Taluka (2011)
Religion	Percent
Hinduism	89.93%
Buddhism	6.43%
Islam	2.63%
Other or not stated	1.01%

Languages of Mulshi Taluka (2011)
1. Marathi (88.7%)
2. Hindi (5.02%)
3. Kannada (1.22%)
4. Lambadi (1.03%)
5. Others (4.04%)

Mulshi taluka has a population of 171,006 according to the 2011 census. Mulshi had a literacy rate of 78.34% and a sex ratio of 899 females per 1000 males. 23,041 (13.47%) are under 7 years of age. 25,633 (14.99%) lived in urban areas. Scheduled Castes and Scheduled Tribes make up 10.58% and 4.34% of the population respectively.

At the time of the 2011 Census of India, 88.69% of the population in the district spoke Marathi, 5.02% Hindi, 1.22% Kannada and 1.03% Lambadi as their first language.

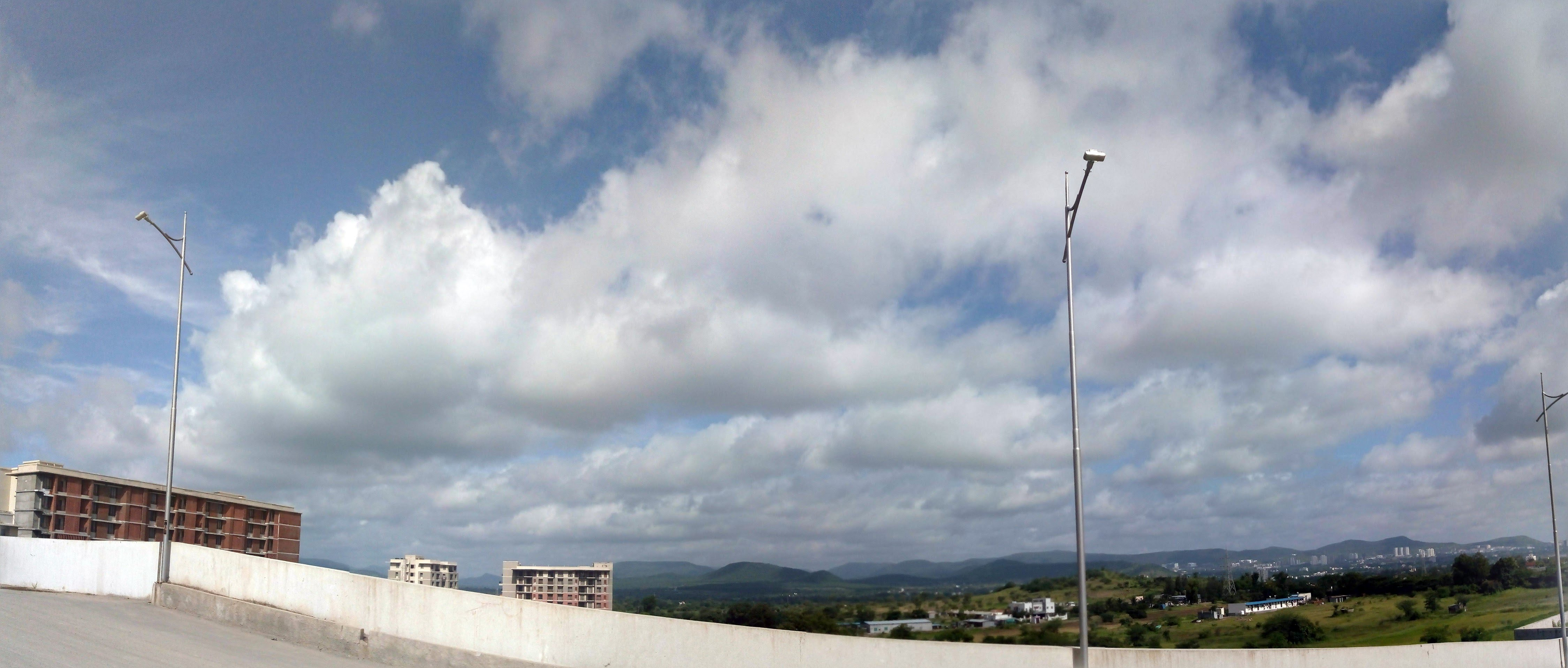
Mulshi

== Pune Metropolitan Region & Villages in Mulshi taluka ==
- Adgaon (Mulshi)
- Admal
- Akole (Mulshi)
- Amarale Wadi
- Ambadwet
- Ambarwet
- Ambavane
- Ambegaon (Mulshi)
- Andeshe
- Andgaon
- Andhale
- Asade
- Barpe Bk.
- Bavadhan BK
- Belawade (Pune Metropolitan Region)
- Bembatmal
- Bhadas Bk.
- Bhalgudi
- Bhambarde
- Bhare
- Bharekarwadi
- Bhegadewadi
- Bhode
- Bhoini
- Bhoirwadi (Pune Metropolitan Region)
- Bhugaon
- Bhukum
- Botarwadi
- Chale (Mulshi)
- Chande (Mulshi)
- Chandivali (Mulshi)
- Chikhalgaon
- Chikhali Bk.
- Chinchwad
- Dakhane
- Darawali
- Dasave
- Dattawadi
- Dattwadi
- Davaje
- Devghar
- Dhadawali
- Dhamanohol
- Disali
- Dongargaon (Mulshi)
- Ekole
- Gadale
- Gavadewadi
- Ghotavade
- Ghutake
- Godambewadi
- Hinjawadi (Pune Metropolitan Region)
- Hadashi
- Hotale
- Hulavalewadi
- Jambe (Mulshi)
- Jamgaon (Mulshi)
- Jatede
- Jawal (Mulshi)
- Kalamshet
- Karmoli
- Kasar Amboli
- Kasarsai
- Kashig
- Katar Khadak
- Katavadi
- Kemasewadi
- Khamboli
- Kharavade
- Khechare
- Khubawali
- Kolavade
- Kolawali
- Koloshi (Mulshi)
- Kolwan
- Kondhawale
- Kondhur
- Kule (Mulshi)
- Kumbhori
- Lavale
- Lavharde
- Maded
- Mahalunge
- Majgaon (Mulshi)
- Male (Mulshi)
- Malegaon (Mulshi)
- Man (Mulshi)
- Maranewadi
- Marunji
- Materewadi (Mulshi)
- Morewadi
- Mose Kh.
- Mugaon
- Mugavade
- Mukaiwadi
- Mulkhed
- Mulshi Kh.
- Muthe
- Maan, Pune (Pune Metropolitan Region)
- Nande
- Nandgaon
- Nandivali
- Nanegaon (Mulshi)
- Nere (Mulshi)
- Nive (Mulshi)
- Padalghar
- Padalgharwadi
- Palase (Mulshi)
- Patharshet
- Paud
- Peth Shahapur
- Pimpaloli
- Pimpri
- Pomgaon
- Punawale
- Ravade
- Rihe
- Saiv Kh
- Sakhari (Mulshi)
- Saltar
- Sambhave
- Satesai
- Savargaon
- Share
- Shedani
- Shileshwar
- Shindewadi
- Shirvali
- Sus
- Tail Baila
- Tamhini Bk
- Tata Talav
- Tathawade
- Tav
- Temghar
- Uravade
- Vadgaon
- Valane
- Vandre (Mulshi)
- Vede
- Vegre (Mulshi)
- Visakhar
- Vitthalwadi (Mulshi)
- Wadavali (Mulshi)
- Wajale
- Walen
- Warak (Mulshi)
- Watunde
- Wakad

== See also ==
- Talukas in Pune district
