= Mulshi =

Village in Maharashtra

- village
- Country: India
- State: Maharashtra
- District: Pune

Languages
  - Official: Marathi
- Time zone: UTC+5:30 (IST)
- Vehicle registration: MH-12
- Nearest city: Pune

Mulshi is a village and an administrative block in Pimpri Chinchwad district, Maharashtra, India.
