= Begdewadi railway station =

Railway Station in Maharashtra, India

Begdewadi

General information
- Location: Shelarwadi, Mumbai Road, Tal. Maval, Dist. Pune. India
- Coordinates: 18.7007°N 73.7087°E
- System: Pune Suburban Railway Station
- Owner: Indian Railways
- Line: Pune Suburban Railway
- Platforms: 2
- Tracks: 2

Construction
- Parking: Yes

Other information
- Status: Active
- Station code: BGW
- Fare zone: Central Railway

Services
Preceding station	Pune Suburban Railway	Following station
Ghorawadi towards Lonavala	Lonavala Line	Dehu Road towards Pune Junction
Location
- Location within India Location within Maharashtra

Begdewadi railway station is a railway station on Pune Suburban Railway line. The station is near National Highway 48 (India) on Shelarwadi. The station code is BGW.

All local trains between Pune Junction–Lonavala, Pune Junction–Talegaon, Shivaji Nagar–Lonavala, Shivaji Nagar–Talegaon stops here.

Areas of Maval taluka near this station are Shelarwadi, Ghorawadi Caves, Somatne, Shirgaon.
