= Vadgaon railway station =

Railway station in Vadgaon, India

Vadgaon

General information
- Location: Vadgaon Maval, Tal. Maval, Dist. Pune. India
- Coordinates: 18.7425°N 73.6368°E
- System: Pune Suburban Railway station
- Owner: Indian Railways
- Line: Pune Suburban Railway
- Platforms: 2
- Tracks: 2

Construction
- Parking: Yes

Other information
- Status: Active
- Station code: VDN
- Fare zone: Central Railway

Services
Preceding station	Pune Suburban Railway	Following station
Kanhe towards Lonavala	Lonavala Line	Talegaon towards Pune Junction
Location
- Location within India Location within Maharashtra

Vadgaon Station is a railway station of Pune Suburban Railway on the Mumbai–Chennai line. The station code is VDN. It has one platform. Local trains between Pune Junction–Lonavala and Shivaji Nagar–Lonavala stop here.

The few passenger trains to stop on this station are:

1. Pune–Karjat Passenger.
2. Mumbai–Sainagar Shirdi Fast Passenger.
3. Mumbai–Bijapur Fast Passenger. Station has two platforms and a foot overbridge.
