= Pune railway division =

Railway division of India

Pune railway division is one of the five railway divisions under the jurisdiction of Central Railway zone of the Indian Railways. It has its headquarters located at Pune in the Indian state of Maharashtra state. The other railway divisions are Mumbai CSMT, Nagpur, Solapur and Bhusawal. There are 71 railway stations in Pune railway division.

== Background ==
Pune Division includes four districts of the state of Maharashtra which are Pune, Satara, Sangli and Kolhapur. The division includes one A1 class railway station, four A class stations, 1 B class station, 14 C class stations, 10 D class stations, 31 E class stations and 12 F class stations which makes a total of 71 railway stations in the division.

== History ==
Ministry of Railways decided on formation of a new Railway Division at Pune on 10 January 1996. The foundation stone laying ceremony for the new division was held on 13 January 1996. Initially the Division was started with jurisdiction over Lonavala-Pune section only. With effect from 1 April 2003. Pune–Daund–Baramati section Daund and Pune–Miraj–KOP section were added which increased the jurisdiction to 503.39. route-km.

Part of DRM office is functioning from campus of IRICEN and remaining offices are housed in a portion of Goods Shed, having entry from Ambedkar Marg. The Phase I of New DRM Office building is under construction and is expected to be ready by middle of this year.

Division has 71 stations out of which Pune is categorized as A1 station & Miraj and Kolhapur are categorized as A stations.

Twenty-four stations of daund-Ankai section will be merged with Pune railway division. Currently Daund-Ankai section is under solapur railway division. Merging with pune division will incarese the chances of starting demu services between Ahmednagar and pune railway station.

== Ticketing ==
Pune railway division dealt with 3.35 crores of suburban and 3.63 crores of non-suburban originating passengers annually.

Passenger Reservation System (PRS) facilities are available at Pune junction plus 4 Cyber Booking Offices (CBOs) in Pune City i.e. Deccan Gymkhana, Shankarseth Road, Raviwar Peth & Pune Cant. PRS facilities are also available at Khadki, Chinchwad, Miraj, Kolhapur, Satara, Sangli, Karad, Baramati. Two more PRS centres operated by Defence personnel are functioning at Khadki Cantt. & Dehu Road. PRS at Ichalkaranji post office is being operated by their staff.

Pune railway division has the distinction of being the first railway division to complete the installation of all UTS & UTS cum PRS locations. At present division has total 59 UTS (Unreserved Ticketing System) of which 12 are UTS cum PRS locations.

== Goods traffic ==
POL, sugar, maize and motor vehicles constitute as major components of outward goods traffic. POL is loaded from LONI.Sugar from Gurmarket, Sangli, Karad, Baramati, Satara, Miraj and motor vehicles from Chinchwad.Approximately 600 rakes/year of outward traffic is handled on Pune Division.

Nearly 2000 Rakes/year of inward traffic is received and handled on Pune division. Cement and steel are received at Pune, Khadki, Loni, Saswad.Fertilizers, food grains are received at Miraj, Sangli, Saswad and Satara. POL loaded from Loni and other location is received at Miraj and Bhilvadi.

== Connections ==
It connects other railway division of central Railway Zone as

- Lonavala (exclude)-Pune Junction-Daund Junction
- Pune Junction - Lonand Jn.- Satara - Karad - Sangli - Miraj Jn - Kolhapur
- Daund Junction - Baramati.
- Lonand Junction - Phaltan
- Daund Jn. - Baramati - Phaltan - Lonand Jn. (under construction)
- Lonand Jn. - Phaltan - Pandharpur (Phaltan - Pandharpur Proposed, Lonand Jn. - Phaltan Operational)

== Junction Stations and their routes ==
The Junction railway stations in the Pune railway divisions are Pune Junction and Daund Junction, Miraj Junction.

The only terminal station in the division is Kolhapur as Chattrapati Shahu Maharaj Terminus.

=== List of railway stations and towns ===
Division has 71 stations out of which Pune is categorized as A1 station. Sangli, Miraj and Kolhapur are categorized as A stations. The list includes the stations under the Pune division and their station category.

Category of station	No. of stations	Names of stations
A-1 Category	1	Pune Junction
A Category	5	Sangli, Daund Junction ,Miraj Junction, Chhatrapati Shahu Maharaj Terminus, Shivaji Nagar
B Category	2	Karad, Satara
C Category (Suburban station)	14	Malavli, Kamshet, Vadgaon, Talegaon, Ghorawadi, Begdewadi, Dehu Road, Akurdi, Chinchwad, Pimpri, Kasarwadi, Dapodi, Khadki
D Category	8	Baramati, Kedgaon, Jaysinghpur, Kirloskarwadi, Uruli, Hatkangale, Jejuri, Lonand
E Category	31	Hadapsar, Loni, Yewat, Patas, Sasvad, Phursungi, Alandi, Shirvade, Ambale, Rajewadi, Daundaj, Walha, Nira, Salpa, Adarki, Wathar, Palsi, Jarandeshwar, Koregaon, Rahimatpur, Targaon, Masur, Shindwane, Shenoli, Bhavaninagar, Takari, Nandre, Rukdi, Ghorpuri, Valivade, Bhilawadi
F Category; Halt Station	11	Amnapur, Kadethan, Kanhe, Katphal, Shriful Khutbav, Madhavnagar, Maladgaon, Manjri Bk., Nimshirgaon, Shirsai, Vishrambag
Total	70	-

== Railway line and en route stations ==
There are four main lines in this railway subdivision and two branch lines.

The railway line en route station details are as follows

=== Pune-Lonavala ===
- Pune Jn-Lonavala (Exclude)

The total length of this section is 63.83 Kilometers, which includes a total of 18 stations. Out of the 18 stations, there are 11 B class, a C class, 4 D class and 2 SPL class stations. The line includes a Double Line system, with traction of AC Electrification.

The system of working is Absolute Block System.

The maximum Permissible Speed are given below,

- Mail/EXP Trains - 105 km/h
- Passenger Trains - 105 km/h
- EMU Locals - 80 km/h
- Goods Trains - 75 km/h

En route station details-

Pune Junction, Shivaji Nagar , Khadki, Dapodi, Kasarwadi, Pimpri, Chinchwad, Akurdi, Dehu Road, Begdewadi, Ghorawadi, Talegaon, Vadgaon, Kanhe, Kamshet, Malavli and Lonavala(exclude)

Station	Station code	Main/Branch	Double/Single line	Distance in km
Pune Junction	Pune	Main	Double	0
Shivaji Nagar	SVJR	Main	Double	2.4
Khadki	KK	Main	Double	6.24
Dapodi	DAPD	Main	Double	8.22
Kasarwadi	KSWD	Main	Double	11.59
Pimpri	PMP	Main	Double	14.26
Chinchwad	CCH	Main	Double	16.42
Akurdi	AKRD	Main	Double	19.66
Dehu Road	DEHR	Main	Double	24.51
Begdewadi	BGWI	Main	Double	28.18
Ghorawadi	GRWD	Main	Double	31.25
Talegaon	TGN	Main	Double	34.26
Vadgaon	VDN	Main	Double	38.21
Kanhe	KNHE	Main	Double	42.7
Kamshet	KMST	Main	Double	47.89
Malavli	MVL	Main	Double	55.86
Lonavala	LNL	Main	Double	64.31

=== Pune-Daund ===
Pune Jn - Daund Jn The total length of this section is 75.59 Kilometers, which includes a total of 11 stations. Out of the 11 stations, there are 7 B class, no C class, 3 D class and 1 SPL class stations. The line includes a Double Line system, with traction of Electric. The electrification of the line was completed in October 2016.

The system of working is Absolute Block System.

The maximum Permissible Speed are given below,

- Mail/EXP Trains - 105 km/h
- Passenger Trains - 105 km/h
- Goods Trains - 75 km/h
- Enroute station details- Pune Junction, Hadapsar, Manjari Budruk, Loni, Uruli, Yavat, Khutbav, Kedgaon, Kadethan, Patas and Daund Junction.

Station	Station Code	Main/Branch	Double/Single line	Distance in km
Pune Junction	PUNE	Main	Double	0
Hadapsar	HDP	Main	Double	5.71
Manjari Budruk	MJBK	Main	Double	11.69
Loni	LONI	Main	Double	16.41
Uruli	URI	Main	Double	28.67
Yavat	YT	Main	Double	40.61
Khutbav	KTT	Main	Double	47.61
Kedgaon	KDG	Main	Double	54.03
Kadethan	KDTN	Main	Double	58.91
Patas	PAA	Main	Double	64
Daund Junction	DD	Main	Double	76.61

=== Daund-Baramati ===
Daund Junction - Baramati The total length of this section is 43.70 Kilometers, which includes a total of 6 stations. Out of the 6 stations, there are 1 B class, no C class, 4 D class and 1 SPL class stations. The line includes a Single Line system.

The system of working is One Train Only System.

The maximum Permissible Speed are given below,

- Mail/EXP Trains - 60 km/h
- Passenger Trains - 60 km/h
- Goods Trains - 40 km/h
- En route station details- Daund Junction, Maladgaon, Shirsai, Sirsuphal, Katphal and Baramati.

Station	Station Code	Main/Branch	Double/Single line	Distance in km
Daund Jn	DD	Branch	Single	0
Maladgaon	MDDG	Branch	Single	13.39
Shirsai	SSI	Branch	Single	20.62
Katphal	KFH	Branch	Single	33.64
Baramati	BRMT	Branch	Single	43.70

This railway line may straight connectivity to Manmad to Sangli and South India .. Via connection of Ahmadnagar Baramati Phaltan Vita Tasgoan and Sangli

=== Baramati-Lonand ===
Baramati - Lonand Jn The total length of this section is 53.038 Kilometers, which includes a total of 6 stations. Out of the 6 stations, there are 1 B class, no C class, 4 D class and 1 SPL class stations. The line includes a Single Line system. The section meets the Pune-Miraj Section at Lonand Jn. The rail link from Lonand Jn to Phaltan was completed in 2011 but there is absolute no progress in rail link construction for the remainder section i.e. from Phaltan to Baramati. So this section is incomplete.

The system of working is One Train Only System.

The maximum Permissible Speed are given below,

- Mail/EXP Trains - 60 km/h
- Passenger Trains - 60 km/h
- Goods Trains - 40 km/h
- En route station details- Baramati, Sangawi, Phaltan, Nimbore, Taradgaon and Lonanad Jn.

Station	Station Code	Main/Branch	Double/Single line	Distance in km	Status
Baramati	BRMT	Branch	Single	0	Under construction
Sangawi	SNG	Branch	Single	16.750	Under construction
Phaltan	PLT	Branch	Single	24.175	Complete
Nimbore	NB	Branch	Single	33.665	Complete
Taradgaon	TDG	Branch	Single	44.875	Complete
Lonand Jn	LNN	Branch	Single	53.038	Complete

=== Pune-Miraj ===
Pune–Miraj–Londa line The total length of this section is 279.05 Kilometers, which includes a total of 36 stations. Out of the 36 stations, there are 30 B class, no C class, 4 D class and 2 SPL class stations. The line includes a Double Line system. The section meets the Baramati-Lonand Section at Lonand Jn.

The system of working is Absolute Block System.

The maximum Permissible Speed are given below,

- Mail/EXP Trains - 100 km/h
- Passenger Trains - 100 km/h
- Goods Trains - 75 km/h

En route station details- Pune Jn - Ghorpadi - Alandi - Jejuri - Lonand Jn - Satara - Karad - Sangli - Miraj Jn

Station	Station Code	Main/Branch	Double/Single line	Distance in km
Pune Jn	PUNE	Main	Double	0
Ghorpadi	GPR	Main	Double	2.36
Sasvad Rd	SSV	Main	Double	11.18
Phursungi	FSG	Main	Double	16.51
Alandi	ALN	Main	Double	23.22
Shindawane	SHIV	Main	Double	31.67
Ambale	ABELE	Main	Double	41.12
Rajevadi	RJW	Main	Double	45.84
Jejuri	JJR	Main	Double	58.03
Daundaj	DNJ	Main	Double	65.85
Valha	WLH	Main	Double	74.37
Nira	NIRA	Main	Double	84.54
Lonand Jn	LNN	Main	Double	92.16
Salpa	SLP	Main	Double	101.22
Adarki	AKI	Main	Double	109.22
Watkar	WTR	Main	Double	119.32
Palsi	PLV	Main	Double	128.71
Jarandeswar	JSV	Main	Double	137.66
Satara	STR	Main	Double	145.23
Koregaon	KRG	Main	Double	156.13
Rahimatpur	RMP	Main	Double	166.26
Targaon	TAZ	Main	Double	177.25
Masur	MSR	Main	Double	189.82
Shirvade	SIW	Main	Double	195.10
Karad	KRD	Main	Double	203.7
Shenoli	SNE	Main	Double	216.66
Bhavani Nagar	BVNR	Main	Double	224.92
Takari	TKR	Main	Double	230.34
Kirloskarwadi	KOV	Main	Double	238.60
Amnapur	ANQ	Main	Double	245.31
Bhilawadi	BVQ	Main	Double	252.26
Nandre	NDE	Main	Double	259.20
Madhavnagar	MDVR	Main	Double	268.80
Sangli	SLI	Main	Double	271.82
Vishrambag	VRB	Main	Double	273.71
Miraj Jn	MRJB	Main	Double	279.05

=== Miraj-Kolhapur ===
Miraj Jn - Chattrapati Shahu Maharaj Terminus The total length of this section is 47.10 Kilometers, which includes a total of 8 stations. Out of the 8 stations, there are 2 B class, no C class, 4 D class and 2 SPL class stations. The line includes a Single Line system.

The system of working is Absolute Block System.

The maximum Permissible Speed are given below,

- Mail/EXP Trains - 100 km/h
- Passenger Trains - 100 km/h
- Goods Trains - 75 km/h
- En route station details- Miraj, Jaysingpur, Nimshirgaon Tamdalge, Hatkanangale, Rukadi, Valivade, Gurumarket and Kolhapur.

Station	Station Code	Main/Branch	Double/Single line	Distance in km
Miraj	MRJB	Main	Single	0
Jaysingpur	JSP	Main	Single	11.78
Nimshirgaon Tamdalge	NMGT	Main	Single	20.79
Hatkanangale	HTK	Main	Single	26.48
Rukadi	RKD	Main	Single	33.38
Valivade	VV	Main	Single	40.46
Gur Market	CRMT	Main	Single	43.85
Chattrapati Shahu Maharaj Terminus	CSMT	Main	Single	47.10

== Diesel Loco Shed ==
Diesel Loco Shed, Pune is an engine shed located in Pune, Maharashtra in India. It is located east of Pune Junction, falling under Pune Railway Division. Of the three diesel loco sheds in the Central Railway zone, this is the largest among them followed by Kurla and Kalyan.
