= Pune Suburban Railway =

Suburban rail system

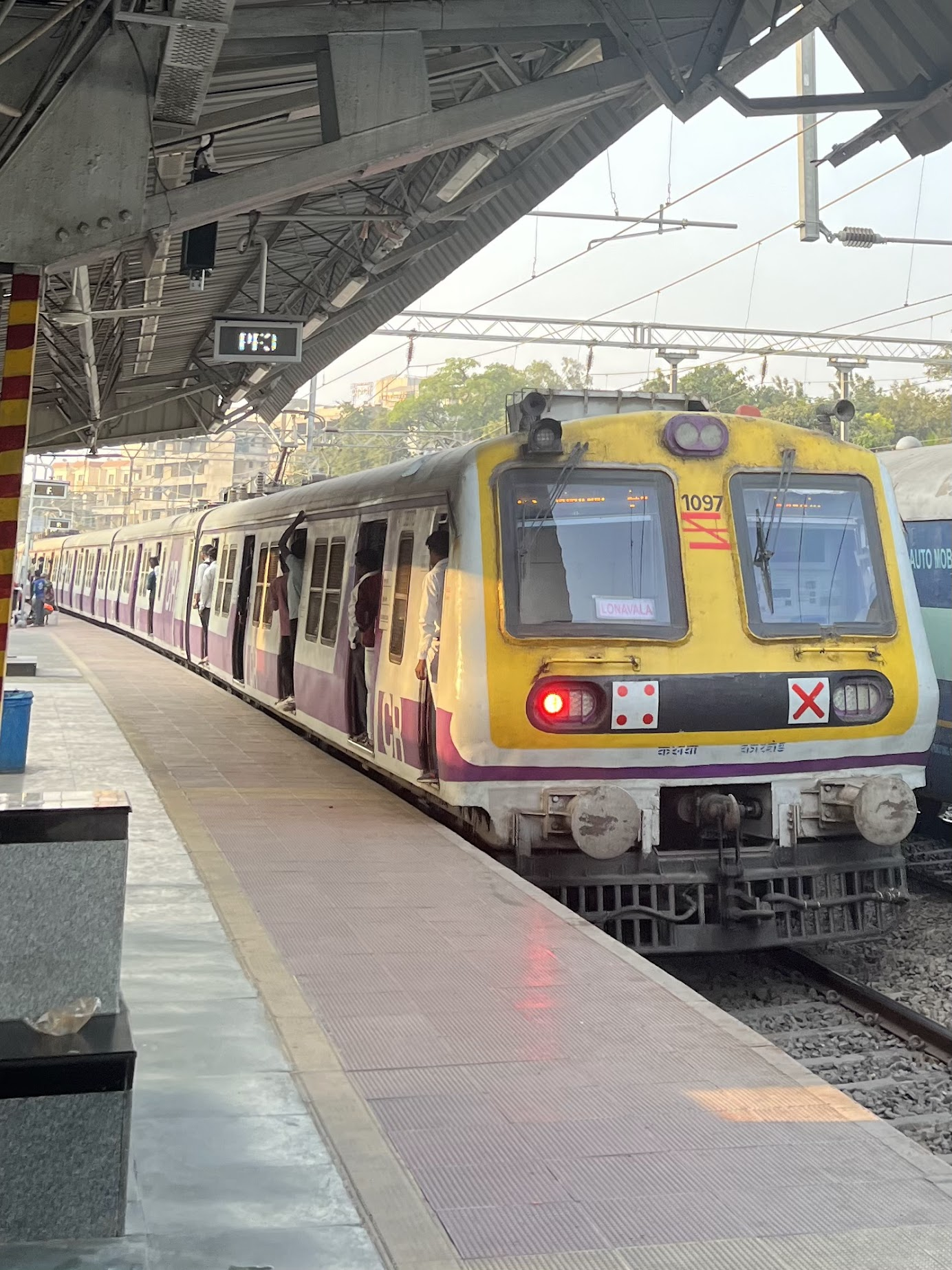
- An EMU at Chinchwad bound for Lonavala from Pune

Overview
- Native name: पुणे उपनगरीय रेल्वे
- Owner: Indian Railways
- Locale: Pune district, Maharashtra, India
- Transit type: Suburban Rail
- Number of lines: 1
- Number of stations: 18
- Daily ridership: 100,000
- Website: cr.indianrailways.gov.in

Operation
- Began operation: 11 March 1978
- Operator: Central Railway (CR)
- Character: At-grade
- Train length: 12 cars

Technical
- System length: 63 km (39 mi)
- No. of tracks: 2
- Track gauge: 1,676 mm (5 ft 6 in) broad gauge
- Electrification: 25 kV 50 Hz AC overhead line

Pune Suburban Railway (Marathi: पुणे उपनगरीय रेल्वे), also known as Pune Local, is a suburban rail system connecting Pune to its suburbs and neighboring villages in Pune District, Maharashtra. It is operated by Central Railway (CR), part of Indian Railways. The system operates on two routes, Pune Junction–Lonavala and its part Shivaji Nagar–Talegaon. 17 trains operate on Pune Junction–Lonavala route and 4 trains operate on Shivaji Nagar–Talegaon route. Also, DEMU trains operate on Pune Junction–Daund–Baramati route.

== History ==
The Central Railway (CR) introduced electric multiple units (EMU) on the existing 63 km railway line between Pune Junction and Lonavala on 11 March 1978. The line had previously been serviced by regular trains. The EMU service reduced end-to-end travel time on the line from 2.5 hours to 1.5 hours.

Nine-car trains were operated on the Pune Suburban Railway until March 2009, when they were replaced by 12-car services.

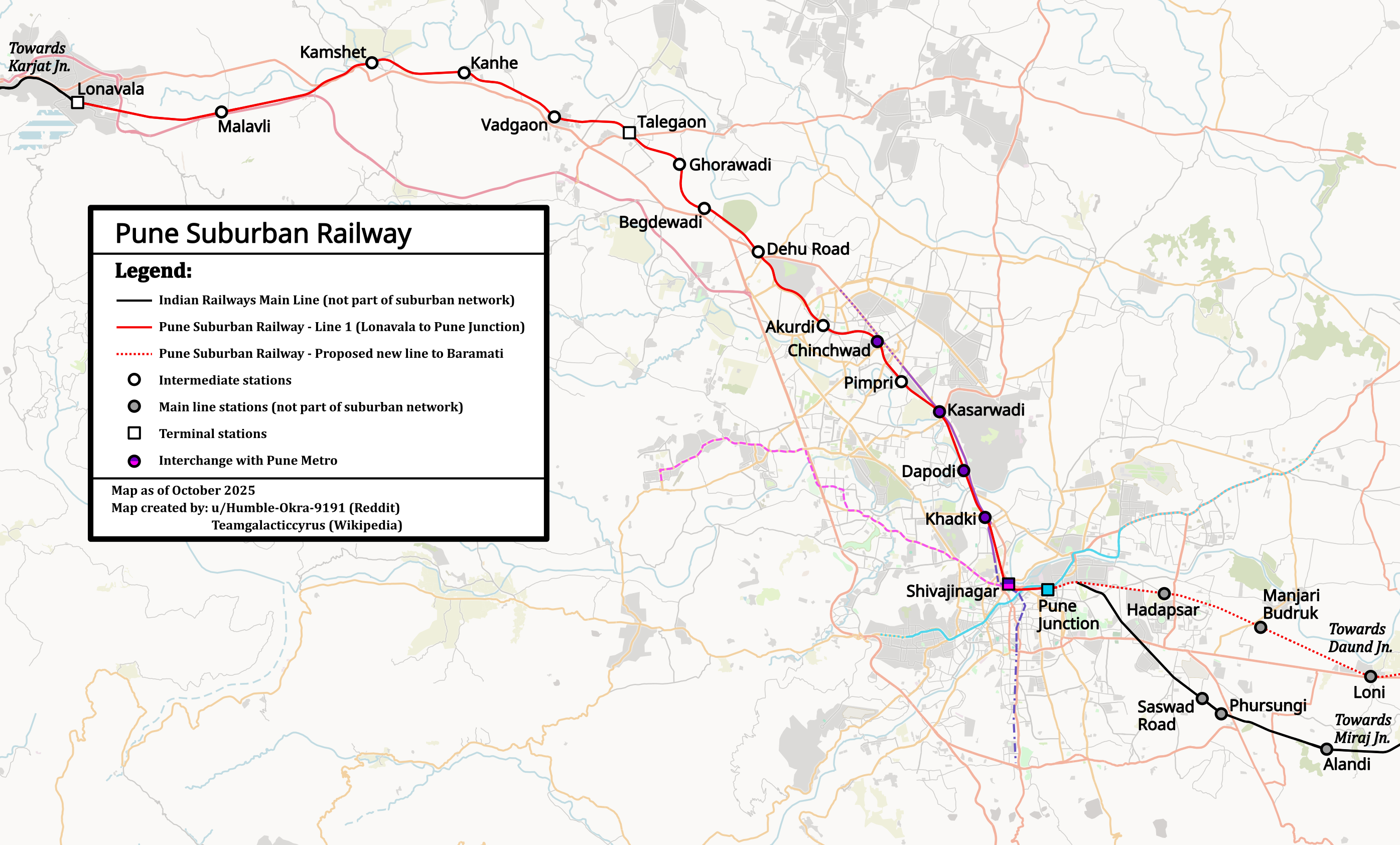
Map of the Pune Suburban Railway network

== Stations ==
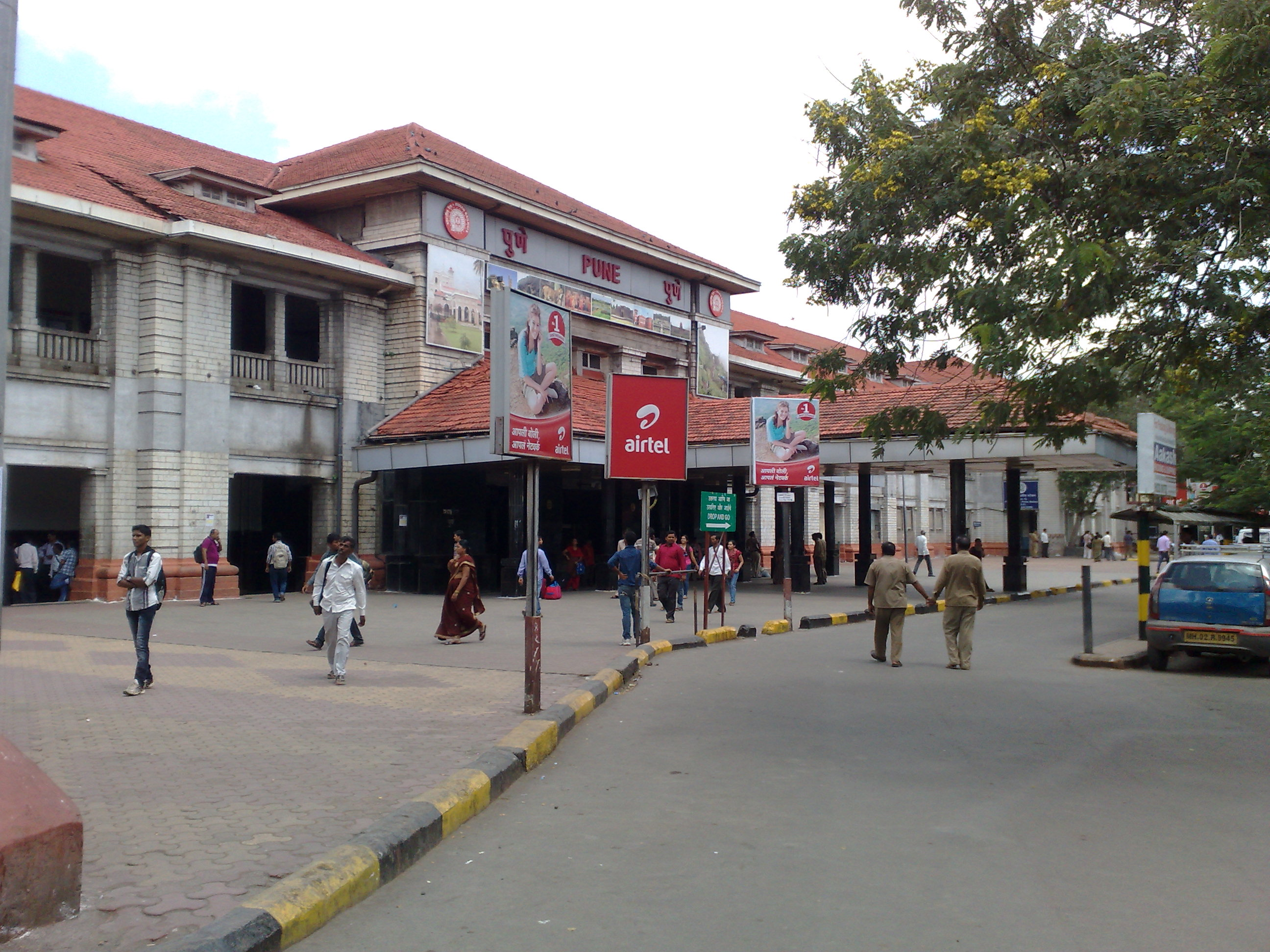
Pune Junction station

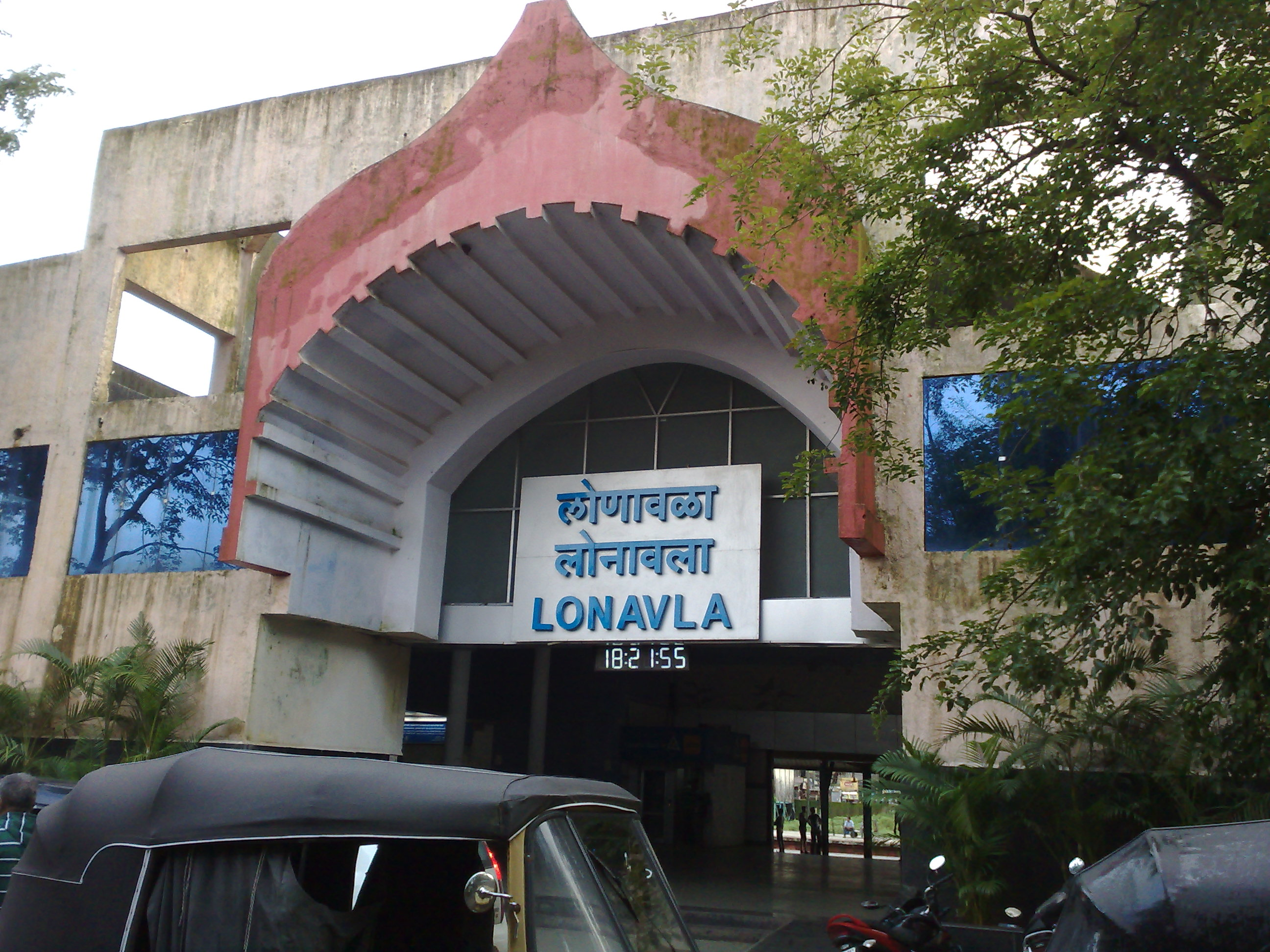
Lonavala station

Note: Stations in bold are terminal stations.

Pune Suburban Railway
| Station name | | Railway Station Code | City/Town | Service Area |
| English | Marathi | Railway Station Code | City/Town | Service Area |
|---|---|---|---|---|
| **Pune Junction** | पुणे जंक्शन | PUNE | Pune | Koregaon Park, Peth Areas, Sangamwadi, Yerwada, Camp |
| **Shivaji Nagar** | शिवाजी नगर | SVJR | Shivajinagar | Deccan, Model Colony, Wakdewadi, Narveer Tanajiwadi |
| Khadki | खडकी | KK | Khadki | Aundh, Range Hills, Bopodi, Baner, Pashan |
| Dapodi | दापोडी | DAPD | Pimpri-Chinchwad | Phugewadi, Sangvi, Pimple Gurav |
| Kasarwadi | कासारवाडी | KSWD | Pimpri-Chinchwad | Bhosari, Vallabh Nagar, Pimple Saudagar, Wakad, Hinjewadi |
| Pimpri | पिंपरी | PMP | Pimpri-Chinchwad | Nehru Nagar, Morwadi, Kalewadi, Rahatani |
| Chinchwad | चिंचवड | CCH | Pimpri-Chinchwad | Mohan Nagar, Chinchwad Gaon |
| Akurdi | आकुर्डी | AKRD | Pimpri-Chinchwad | Nigdi, Ravet, Kiwale, Punawale |
| Dehu Road | देहू रोड | DEHR | Dehu | Mamurdi, Dehu Gaon, Chincholi |
| Begdewadi | बेगडेवाडी | BGWI | Talegaon | Begdewadi |
| Ghorawadi | घोरावाडी | GRWD | Talegaon | Somatane Phata, Ghorawadi |
| **Talegaon** | तळेगाव | TGN | Talegaon | Talegaon Dabhade |
| Vadgaon | वडगाव | VDN | Vadgaon | Vadgaon Maval, Navlakh Umbare |
| Kanhe | कान्हे | KNHE | Kanhe | Kanhe, Takave |
| Kamshet | कामशेत | KMST | Kamshet | Kamshet, Khadkale |
| Malavli | मळवली | MVL | Malavli | Malavli |
| **Lonavala** | लोणावळा | LNL | Lonavala | Lonavala |
| Khandala | खंडाळा | KDL | Khandala | Khandala |

== Services ==
=== Pune–Lonavala EMU ===
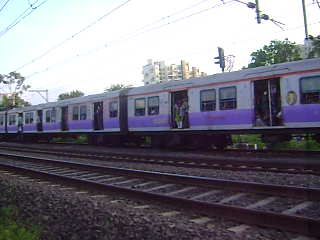
A Pune–Lonavla local

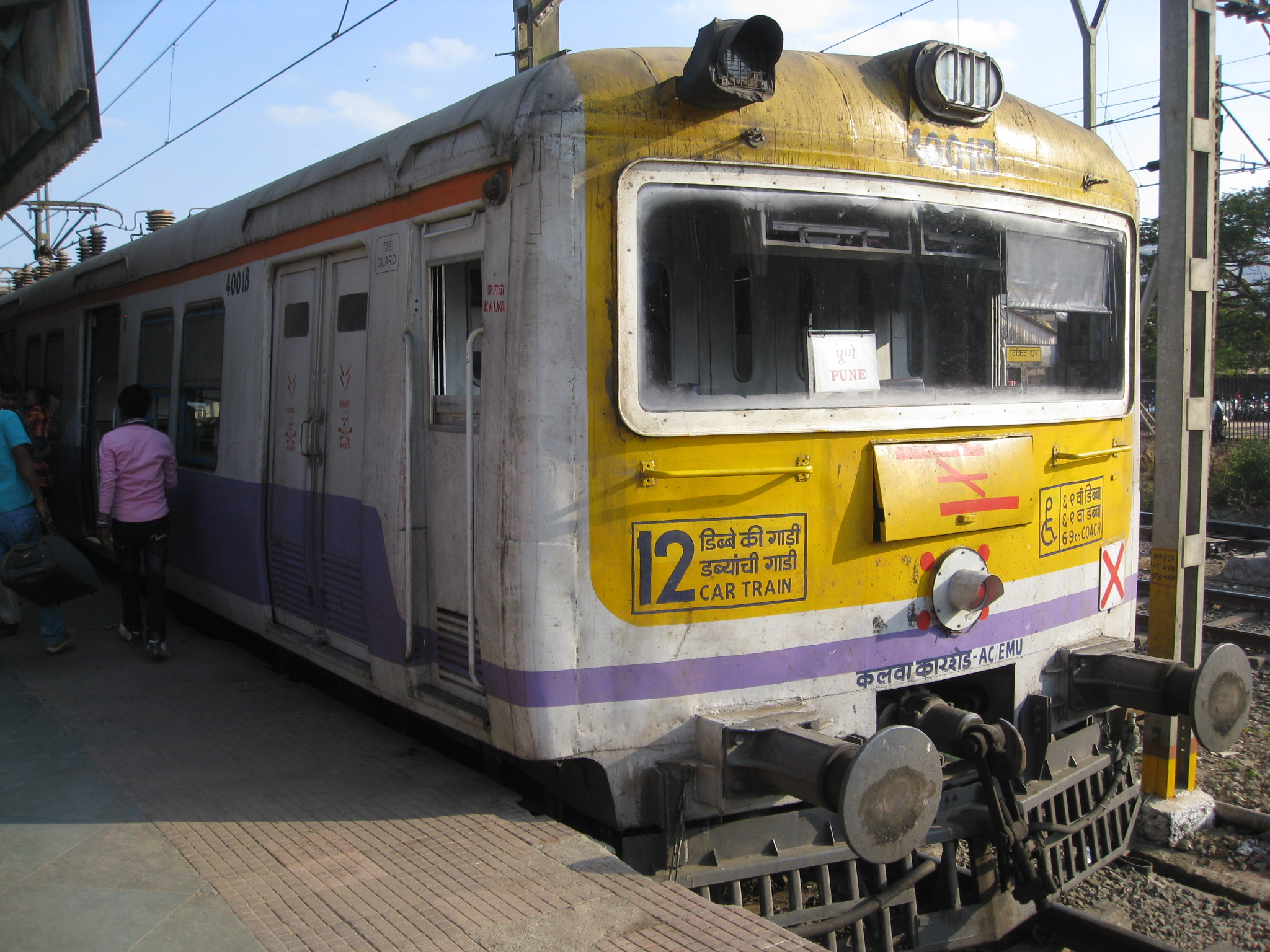
An EMU at Lonavala

Up services
| Train No. | Departure | Origin | Arrival | Destination | Type |
|---|---|---|---|---|---|
| 99802 | 0:15 | Pune | 1:50 | Lonavala | Slow |
| 99804 | 4:45 | Pune | 6:05 | Lonavala | Slow |
| 99806 | 5:45 | Pune | 7:05 | Lonavala | Slow |
| 99808 | 6:30 | Pune | 7:50 | Lonavala | Slow |
| 99902 | 6:48 | Pune | 7:38 | Talegaon | Slow |
| 99810 | 8:10 | Shivaji Nagar | 9:25 | Lonavala | Slow |
| 99904 | 8:53 | Pune | 9:43 | Talegaon | Slow |
| 99812 | 9:57 | Pune | 11:20 | Lonavala | Slow |
| 99814 | 11:17 | Pune | 12:37 | Lonavala | Slow |
| 99816 | 12:05 | Shivaji Nagar | 13:20 | Lonavala | Slow |
| 99818 | 15:00 | Pune | 16:20 | Lonavala | Slow |
| 99906 | 15:47 | Shivaji Nagar | 16:32 | Talegaon | Slow |
| 99820 | 16:25 | Pune | 17:45 | Lonavala | Slow |
| 99822 | 17:20 | Shivaji Nagar | 18:38 | Lonavala | Slow |
| 99824 | 18:02 | Pune | 19:27 | Lonavala | Slow |
| 99826 | 19:10 | Shivaji Nagar | 20:30 | Lonavala | Slow |
| 99828 | 20:05 | Shivaji Nagar | 21:30 | Lonavala | Slow |
| 99830 | 20:37 | Pune | 21:57 | Lonavala | Slow |
| 99832 | 21:05 | Shivaji Nagar | 22:10 | Lonavala | Slow |
| 99834 | 22:10 | Pune | 23:30 | Lonavala | Slow |
| 99908 | 23:15 | Pune | 0:05 | Talegaon | Slow |

Down services
| # | Train No. | Departure | Origin | Arrival | Destination | Type |
|---|---|---|---|---|---|---|
| 1 | 99901 | 0:35 | Talegaon | 1:37 | Pune | Slow |
| 2 | 99801 | 5:20 | Lonavala | 6:40 | Pune | Slow |
| 3 | 99803 | 6:30 | Lonavala | 7:55 | Shivaji Nagar | Slow |
| 4 | 99805 | 7:25 | Lonavala | 8:48 | Pune | Slow |
| 5 | 99903 | 7:48 | Talegaon | 8:38 | Pune | Slow |
| 6 | 99807 | 8:20 | Lonavala | 9:45 | Pune | Slow |
| 7 | 99905 | 9:57 | Talegaon | 10:50 | Pune | Slow |
| 8 | 99809 | 10:05 | Lonavala | 11:25 | Shivaji Nagar | Slow |
| 9 | 99811 | 11:30 | Lonavala | 12:45 | Shivaji Nagar | Slow |
| 10 | 99813 | 14:50 | Lonavala | 16:10 | Pune | Slow |
| 11 | 99815 | 15:30 | Lonavala | 17:05 | Shivaji Nagar | Slow |
| 12 | 99907 | 16:40 | Talegaon | 17:32 | Pune | Slow |
| 13 | 99817 | 17:30 | Lonavala | 18:50 | Shivaji Nagar | Slow |
| 14 | 99819 | 18:08 | Lonavala | 19:40 | Shivaji Nagar | Slow |
| 15 | 99821 | 19:00 | Lonavala | 20:32 | Pune | Fast |
| 15 | Halts: Vadgaon onwards Slow | | | | | |
| 16 | 99823 | 19:35 | Lonavala | 20:55 | Shivaji Nagar | Slow |
| 17 | 99825 | 20:40 | Lonavala | 22:00 | Pune | Slow |
| 18 | 99827 | 21:40 | Lonavala | 23:00 | Pune | Slow |
| 19 | 99829 | 22:05 | Lonavala | 23:25 | Pune | Slow |
| 20 | 99831 | 22:35 | Lonavala | 23:50 | Pune | Fast |
| 20 | Halts: Kamshet, Vadgaon, Talegaon, Dehu Road to Dapodi Slow, Shivaji Nagar | | | | | |
| 21 | 99833 | 23:45 | Lonavala | 1:20 | Pune | Slow |

=== Pune–Daund–Baramati DEMU ===
This section was electrified in 2017, but is currently served by DEMUs only. Since March 2017, three DEMUs have started to operate on Pune–Daund route and one DEMU on Pune–Baramati route. Two DEMUs operate on Daund–Baramati route. There are plans to start EMU services on this section.

Stations

1. Pune Junction
2. Ghorpuri
3. Hadapsar
4. Manjari Budruk
5. Loni
6. Uruli
7. Yevat
8. Khutbav
9. Kedgaon
10. Kadethan
11. Patas
12. Daund Junction
13. Maladgaon
14. Shirsai
15. Katphal
16. Baramati

== Proposed plans ==
According to the 2010-11 Budget, rail proposals were as follows:

1. To build separate platforms for Pune–Lonavala/Talegaon services and increase the frequency to 30 min during peak hours and 45 min other time.
2. Introduction of shuttle service on Pune–Saswad Road–Jejuri/Satara Sector. This will operate every 3 hours with 2/3 wagons for goods.
3. Third track for Pune–Lonavala section. (Demand survey accepted in Budget 2011-12)
4. To increase two terminals on Pune–Lonavala and Pune–Daund sections.
5. To start suburban service on Pune–Rajgurunagar station (Proposed) patch after completion of Pune– Nasik Road, railway for connectivity with New Pune International Airport.

A new EMU terminal is proposed to be built on west of the existing station. It will have two lines and three platforms. This proposal includes:

1. Extension of existing platforms to accommodate 24 bogie trains.
2. A new terminal for EMU to accommodate 15 bogie trains.
3. Three foot over-bridge to connect new terminal to other platforms.
4. Expansion of Hadapsar for new trains to origin and terminate at the station.

== See also ==
- Pune Metro
- Pune BRTS
- Pune
