= Pune–SCSMT Kolhapur Express =

Train in India

Pune - SCSMT Kolhapur Express

Overview
- Service type: Express
- Status: Active
- Locale: Maharashtra
- First service: 20 October 2026; 41 days' time
- Current operator: Central Railway (CR)

Route
- Termini: Pune Junction (PUNE); SCSMT Kolhapur (KOP)
- Stops: 22
- Distance travelled: 326 km (203 mi)
- Average journey time: 7h 28m
- Service frequency: Daily
- Train number: 11419 / 11420

On-board services
- Classes: General Unreserved, Sleeper Class, AC 3rd Class, AC 2nd Class
- Seating arrangements: Yes
- Sleeping arrangements: Yes
- Catering facilities: On-board Catering; E-Catering
- Observation facilities: Large windows
- Baggage facilities: No
- Other facilities: Below the seats

Technical
- Rolling stock: LHB coach
- Track gauge: 1,676 mm (5 ft 6 in)
- Electrification: 25 kV 50 Hz AC overhead line
- Operating speed: 130 km/h (81 mph) maximum, 45 km/h (28 mph) average including halts.
- Track owner: Indian Railways

The 11419 / 11420 Pune–SCSMT Kolhapur Express is an express train belonging to Central Railway zone that runs between the city Pune Junction and SCSMT Kolhapur of Maharashtra in India.

It operates as train number 11419 from Pune Junction to SCSMT Kolhapur and as train number 11420 in the reverse direction, serving the state of Maharashtra.

== Services ==
- 11419 / Pune–SCSMT Kolhapur Express has an average speed of 44 km/h and covers 326 km in 7h 28m.
- 11420 / SCSMT Kolhapur–Pune Express has an average speed of 44 km/h and covers 326 km in 7h 20m.

== Schedule ==
- 11419 – 9:40 PM (Daily) [Pune Junction]
- 11420 – 9:50 PM (Daily) [SCSMT Kolhapur]

== Routes and halts ==
The important halts of the train are :

- Pune Junction
- Sasvad Road
- Jejuri
- Nira
- Lonand Junction
- Wathar
- Satara
- Koregaon
- Rahimatpur
- Targaon
- Masur
- Karad
- Takari
- Kirloskarvadi
- Bhilavdi
- Sangli
- Miraj Junction
- Jaysingpur
- Hatkanangale
- Rukadi
- Vailvade
- SCSMT Kolhapur

== Coach composition ==
The train has 16 coaches are :

1. General Unreserved - 4
2. Sleeper Class - 7
3. AC 3rd Class - 4
4. AC 2nd Class - 1

== Traction ==
As the entire route is fully electrified, it is hauled by a Ajni Loco Shed-based WAP-7 electric locomotive from Pune Junction to SCSMT Kolhapur and vice versa.

== Rake reversal or rake share ==
The train will Rake Sharing with Maharashtra Express (11039/11040).

== See also ==
Trains from Pune Junction :

1. Ahmedabad–Pune Duronto Express
2. Deccan Queen
3. Pune–Nagpur Humsafar Express
4. Pune–Secunderabad Shatabdi Express
5. Pune–Ernakulam Express

Trains from SCSMT Kolhapur :

1. SCSMT Kolhapur–Pune Vande Bharat Express
2. CSMT Kolhapur–Hazrat Nizamuddin Superfast Express
3. Solapur–CSMT Kolhapur Express
4. Kolhapur–Dhanbad Deekshabhoomi Express
5. Mahalaxmi Express

== Notes ==
a. Runs daily a week in both directions.
