= Akurdi railway station =

Railway Station in Maharashtra, India

Akurdi

General information
- Location: B.D.Tupe Road, Sector-26, Nigdi Pradhikaran, Pune. India
- Coordinates: 18.6483°N 73.7647°E
- Elevation: 590 m (1,940 ft)
- System: Pune Suburban Railway station
- Owner: Indian Railways
- Line: Pune Suburban Railway
- Platforms: 2
- Tracks: 2

Construction
- Parking: Yes

Other information
- Status: Active
- Station code: AKRD
- Fare zone: Central Railway

Services
Preceding station	Pune Suburban Railway	Following station
Dehu Road towards Lonavala	Lonavala Line	Chinchwad towards Pune Junction
Location
- Location within India Location within Maharashtra

Akurdi Station is a suburban railway station of Pune Suburban Railway. The station is in Sector-26 of Nigdi Pradhikaran. All suburban (local) trains between Pune Junction–Lonavala, Pune Junction–Talegaon, Shivaji Nagar–Lonavala, Shivajinagar–Talegaon stop here. It is a major local station for students travelling from Pune to D Y Patil College of Engineering, Akurdi and Pimpri-Chinchwad College of Engineering, Nigdi which is at a walking distance.

== Trains ==
Six medium-long range trains halt at Akurdi railway station. All six are passenger trains. Akurdi station has two platforms and a foot overbridge. Nearby areas are Ravet, Walhekarwadi, Bijli Nagar and Sector 26, 25, 27, 27A, 28, 29, 30, 32A of Nigdi Pradhikaran.

=== Improvements ===
Infrastructure upgrades and renovation was taken up in April 2025 as part of Amrit Bharat Station Scheme. In 2018, the station got a reservation booth. A restaurant on wheels, called Bogie Wogie, was started in December 2024.
