= Ghorawadi railway station =

Railway station in Pune district, India

Ghorawadi
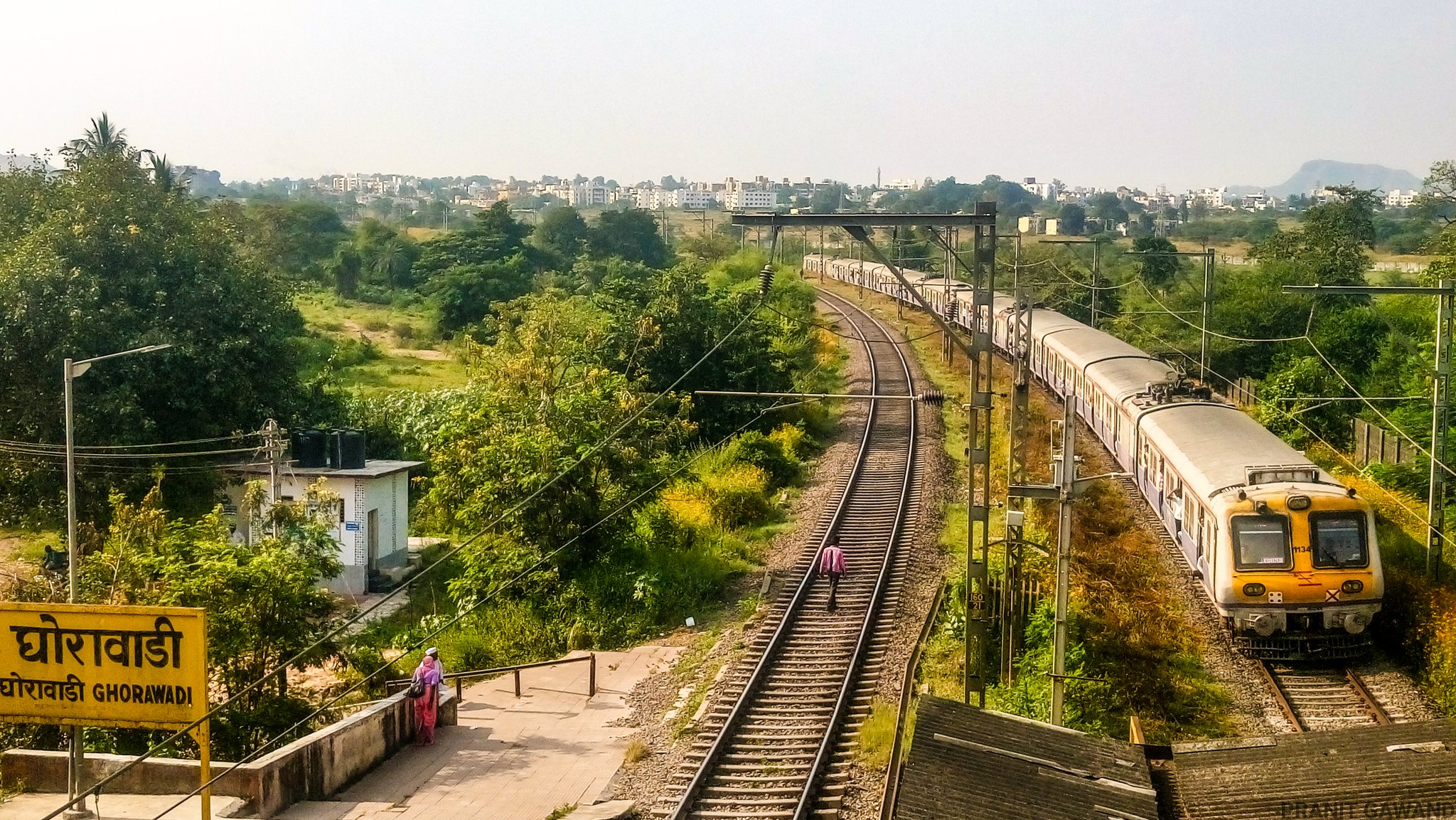
- 12 coach MRVC Siemens rake of Pune Suburban Train entering Ghorawadi

General information
- Location: Ghorawadi, Tal. Maval, Dist. Pune; India
- Coordinates: 18.7206°N 73.6967°E
- System: Pune Suburban Railway station
- Owner: Indian Railways
- Line: Pune Suburban Railway
- Platforms: 2
- Tracks: 2

Construction
- Parking: Yes

Other information
- Status: Active
- Station code: GRWD
- Fare zone: Central Railway

Services
Preceding station	Pune Suburban Railway	Following station
Talegaon towards Lonavala	Lonavala Line	Begdewadi towards Pune Junction
Location
- Location within India Location within Maharashtra

Ghorawadi railway station is a railway station on Pune Suburban Railway line. The station code is GRWD.

All local trains between Pune Junction–Lonavala, Pune Junction–Talegaon, Shivaji Nagar–Lonavala, Shivaji Nagar–Talegaon stop here.

Pune Junction–Karjat Passenger also stops here. Nearest areas are Ghorawadi, Talegaon Dabhade.

It has two platforms. It is the only railway station in India where platforms are not parallel to each other; it is a step formation.

In December 2020, the station was in news for wrong reasons when an RPF guard allegedly beat two senior citizens.
