= Dehu Road railway station =

Railway station in Dehu Road, India

Dehu Road

General information
- Location: Dehu Road Cantonment, Dist. Pune. India
- Coordinates: 18.6803°N 73.7344°E
- System: Pune Suburban Railway station
- Owner: Indian Railways
- Line: Pune Suburban Railway
- Platforms: 5
- Tracks: 6

Construction
- Parking: Yes

Other information
- Status: Active
- Station code: DEHR
- Fare zone: Central Railway

Services
Preceding station	Pune Suburban Railway	Following station
Begdewadi towards Lonavala	Lonavala Line	Akurdi towards Pune Junction
Location

Dehu Road railway station is a suburban railway station of Pune Suburban Railway in Central Railway zone. The station code is DEHR.

It is on the Mumbai–Pune railway route. It is owned by central railways department of Indian Railways. It has five platforms, six lines and one footbridge. This station was built for access to Dehu Road Cantonment. Today also this station is used for Indian Army.

During heavy rains, the station suffers water-logging in some areas.

== Suburban ==
- Pune Junction–Lonavala Locals
- Pune Junction–Talegaon Locals
- Shivaji Nagar–Lonavala Local
- Shivaji Nagar–Talegaon Local

== Express & Passengers ==
1. Mumbai–Kolhapur Sahyadri Express
2. Pune Junction–Karjat Passenger
3. Mumbai–Pandharpur Passenger
4. Mumbai–Bijapur–Mumbai Passenger
5. Mumbai–Shirdi Passenger

== See also ==
- Dehu Road
- Pune Suburban Railway
- Maharashtra Cricket Association Stadium
