= Dapodi railway station =

Railway station in Pune district, India

Dapodi
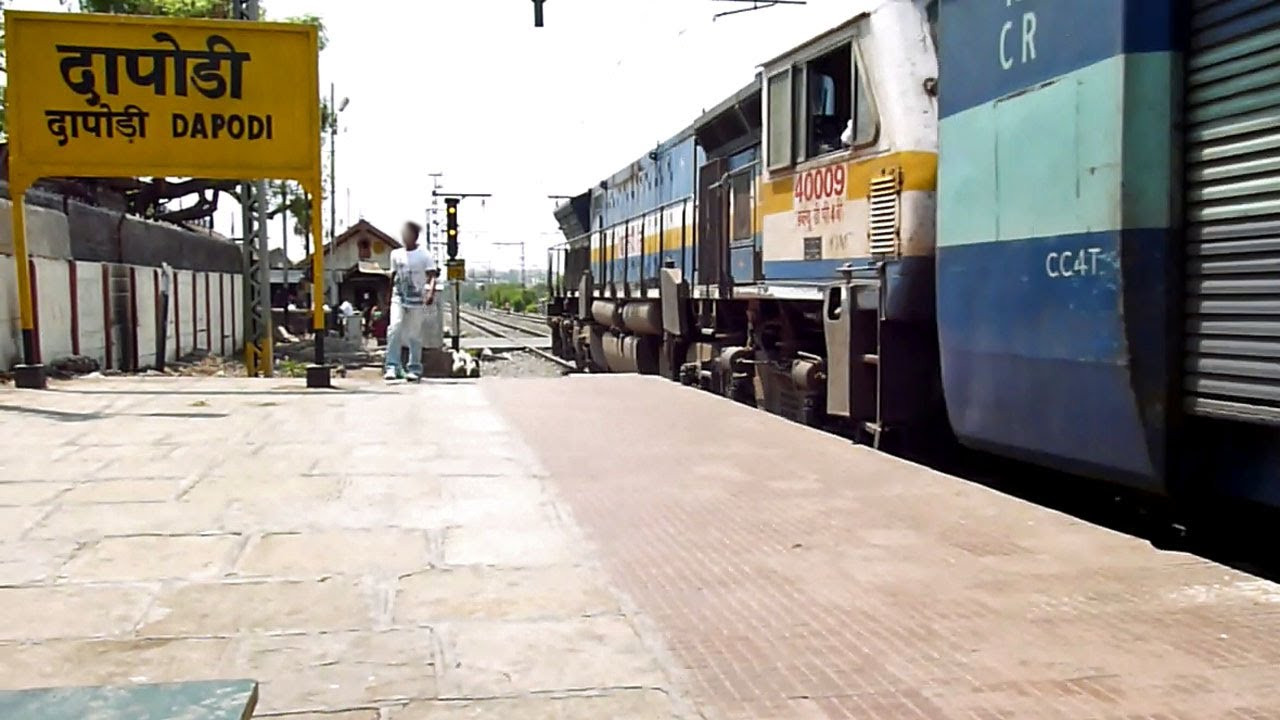
- Dapodi railway station

General information
- Location: Dapodi, Pune; India
- Coordinates: 18.5813°N 73.8327°E
- System: Pune Suburban Railway Station
- Owner: Indian Railways
- Line: Pune Suburban Railway
- Platforms: 2
- Tracks: 2

Construction
- Parking: Yes

Other information
- Status: Active
- Station code: DAPD
- Fare zone: Central Railway

History
- Opened: 1858

Services
Preceding station	Pune Suburban Railway	Following station
Kasarwadi towards Lonavala	Lonavala Line	Khadki towards Pune Junction
Location
- Location within India Location within Maharashtra

Dapodi railway station (Station code: DAPD) is a railway station on Mumbai–Chennai line. It has two platforms and a foot over bridge. It serves the neighbourhood of Dapodi. There is also an interchange for the Pune Metro

== Long-distance trains ==
Only a few long-distance trains have stops at this station. They are,

1. Mumbai–Sainagar Shirdi Fast Passenger.
2. Mumbai–Bijapur Fast Passenger.
3. Mumbai–Pandharpur Fast Passenger.
4. Pune–Karjat Passenger.

== Suburban railway ==
1. Pune Junction–Lonavala trains.
2. Pune Junction–Talegaon trains.
3. Shivaji Nagar–Lonavala trains.
4. Shivaji Nagar–Talegaon trains.
