= Khutbav railway station =

Railway Station in Maharashtra, India

General information
- Location: Kedgaon, Pune district, Maharashtra; India
- Coordinates: 18.4861°N 74.3161°E
- Elevation: 546 metres (1,791 ft)
- System: Indian Railways station
- Owner: Indian Railways
- Operator: Central Railway
- Platforms: 2
- Tracks: 3
- Connections: Auto stand

Construction
- Structure type: Standard (on-ground station)
- Parking: No
- Cycle facilities: No

Other information
- Status: Functioning
- Station code: KTT
- Zone(s): Central Railway
- Division(s): Pune

Services
Preceding station	Indian Railways	Following station
Khutbav towards ?	Central Railway zone Pune–Daund section	Kadethan towards ?
Location
- Location within India Location within Maharashtra

Khutbav railway station is a small railway station in Pune district, Maharashtra. Its code is KTT. It serves Khutbav village. The station consists of two platforms.
