= Loni railway station =

Railway station in Pune, Maharashtra, India

General information
- Location: Pune–Solapur Highway, RajBagh, Loni Kalbhor, Pune; India
- Coordinates: 18.4908°N 74.0211°E
- Elevation: 539.00 metres (1,768.37 ft)
- System: Indian Railways station
- Owner: Indian Railways
- Lines: Dadar–Solapur section Mumbai–Chennai line
- Platforms: 2
- Tracks: 4
- Connections: Auto stand

Construction
- Parking: No
- Cycle facilities: No

Other information
- Station code: LONI
- Fare zone: Central Railway
Location
- Location within India Location within Maharashtra

Loni railway station is a small railway station in Pune district, Maharashtra. Its code is LONI. It serves Loni Kalbhor, a suburban area of the city. The station consist of two platforms. The platforms are not well sheltered. It lacks many facilities including water and sanitation. The main railway station of the city, Pune Junction is always preferred over Loni station for catching several trains. This station is only suitable for local travelling within Pune City. There is also plan to start suburban trains on Pune – Daund section. This station will be a major station for Pune -Daund suburban trains.

== Trains ==
Trains passing through Manjari:

- Pune–Baramati Passenger
- Pune–Baramati–Daund–Pune Passenger
- Pune–Daund Passenger
- Pune–Daund Passenger
- Pune–Daund Fast Passenger
- Pune–Manmad Passenger
- Pune–Nizamabad Passenger
- Pune–Solapur Passenger
- Pune–Solapur Passenger

== See also ==
- Pune Junction
- Shivaji Nagar
- Khadki
- Pune Suburban Railway
