= BVQ =

BVQ or bvq may refer to:

- BVQ, the Indian Railways station code for Bhilawadi railway station, Maharashtra, India
- bvq, the ISO 639-3 code for Birri language, Central African Republic
