= Taradgaon railway station =

Railway station in India

Amethi railway station

General information
- Location: Shindemal, Maharashtra; India
- Coordinates: 18.0380°N 74.2377°E
- Elevation: 579 metres (1,900 ft)
- System: Indian Railways station
- Owner: Indian Railways
- Platforms: 1
- Tracks: 2
- Connections: Auto stand

Construction
- Structure type: Standard (on-ground station)
- Parking: No
- Cycle facilities: No

Other information
- Status: Construction – new line
- Station code: TDG
- Zone(s): Central Railway
- Division(s): Allahabad
Location
- Location within Maharashtra Location within India

Taradgaon railway station is a small railway station in Pune district, Maharashtra. Its code is TDG. It serves Taradgaon city. The station will consists of a single platform. the station is under-construction and lies on Lonand–Daund line.
