= Kamshet railway station =

Railway Station in Maharashtra, India

Kamshet
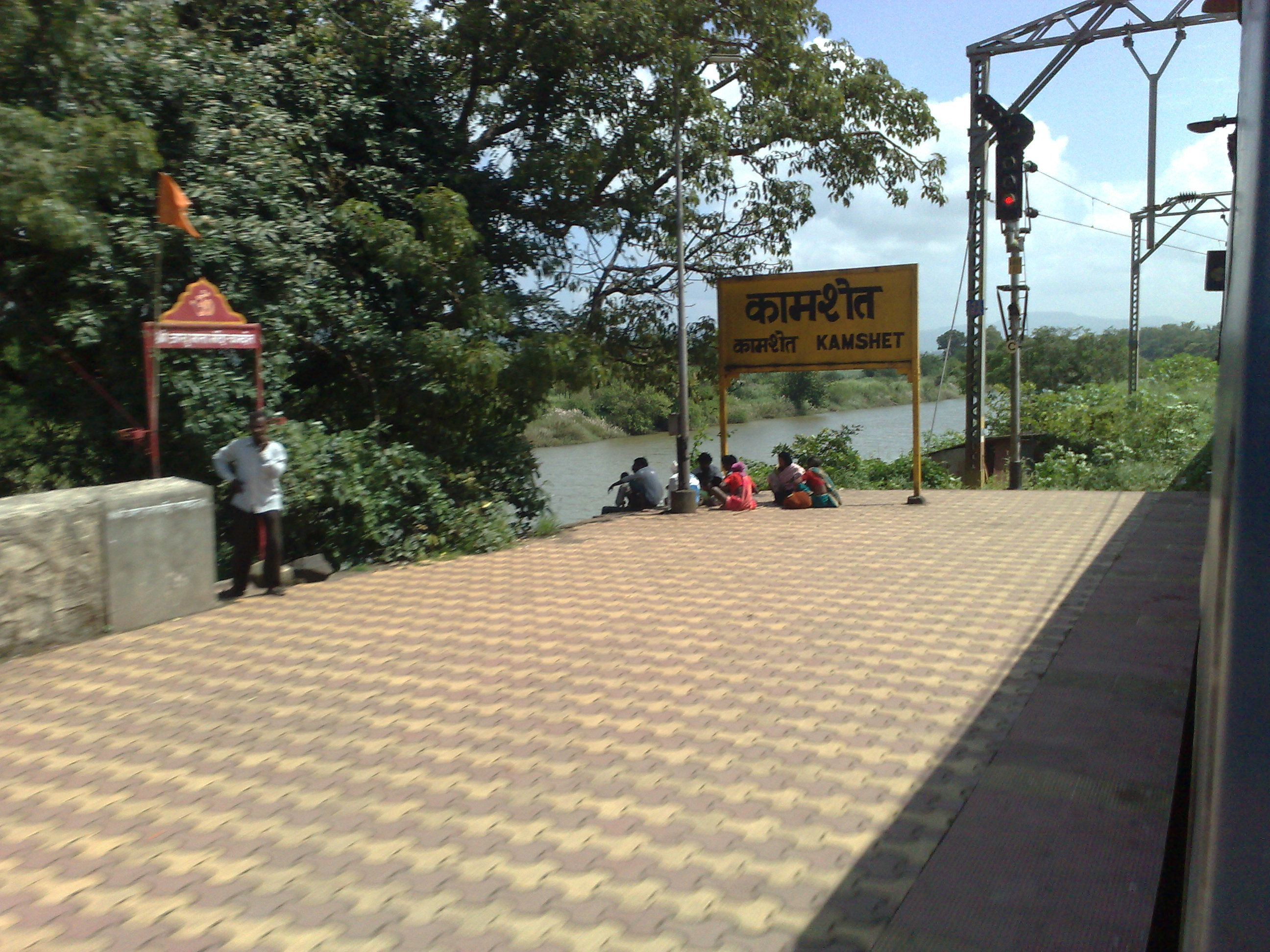

General information
- Location: Kamshet, Tal. Maval, Dist. Pune. India
- Coordinates: 18.7669°N 73.5524°E
- System: Pune Suburban Railway station
- Owner: Indian Railways
- Line: Pune Suburban Railway
- Platforms: 2
- Tracks: 2

Construction
- Parking: Yes

Other information
- Status: Active
- Station code: KMST
- Fare zone: Central Railway

Services
Preceding station	Pune Suburban Railway	Following station
Malavli towards Lonavala	Lonavala Line	Kanhe towards Pune Junction
Location
- Location within India Location within Maharashtra

Kamshet railway station or Kamshet station is a railway station of Pune Suburban Railway on Mumbai–Chennai line. The station code is KMST.

Local trains between Pune Junction–Lonavala, Shivaji Nagar–Lonavala stop here.

The only passenger train having a stop at this station is the Pune Junction–Karjat Passenger.

The station has two platforms and a foot overbridge. Nearby attractions are two hilly forts, namely Tikona Fort and Tung Fort, and the Pavna Dam and boating.

A lot of senior living homes have come up near the station.
