= Talegaon railway station =

Railway station in Talegaon Dabhade, India

Talegaon

General information
- Location: Talegaon Dabhade, Tal. Maval, Dist. Pune. India
- Coordinates: 18.7355°N 73.6719°E
- System: Pune Suburban Railway station
- Owner: Indian Railways
- Line: Pune Suburban Railway
- Platforms: 2
- Tracks: 5

Construction
- Parking: Yes

Other information
- Status: Active
- Station code: TGN
- Fare zone: Central Railway

Services
Preceding station	Pune Suburban Railway	Following station
Vadgaon towards Lonavala	Lonavala Line	Ghorawadi towards Pune Junction
Location
- Location within India Location within Maharashtra

Talegaon railway station or Talegaon station is an important railway station on the Mumbai–Pune railway route. The station code is TGN. It has two platforms, five lines and one footbridge. This is a major halt for Pune Suburban Railway trains. This station serves as terminal for Pune–Talegaon suburban trains.

The land for the construction of the Talegaon railway station was given to the British government by the Sardar Dabhade family. Now it is owned by Indian Railways. Talegaon MIDC, an industrial area, is situated nearby this station.

In August 2023, Rs.38.54 crore was sanctioned to revamp the station under Naye Bharat ka Naye Station scheme. In April 2022, notices were sent to 64 illegal encroachments who allegedly occupied railway land.

== Suburban ==
1. Pune Junction–Lonavala Locals.
2. Pune Junction–Talegaon station Locals.
3. Shivaji Nagar–Lonavala Local.
4. Shivaji Nagar–Talegaon station Local.

== Express/Mails ==
1. Mumbai–Pune Deccan Express.
2. Mumbai–Kolhapur Sahyadri Express.
3. Mumbai–Kolhapur Koyna Express.
4. Hazur Sahib Nanded-Panvel Express

== Passengers ==
1. Pune–Karjat Passenger
2. Mumbai–Pandharpur Passenger
3. Mumbai–Bijapur Passenger
4. Mumbai–Shirdi Passenger

== See also ==
- Talegaon Dabhade
- Pune Suburban Railway
- Pune Junction
