= Kanhe railway station =

Railway Station in Maharashtra, India

Kanhe

General information
- Location: Kanhe Phata, Tal. Maval, Dist. Pune. India
- Coordinates: 18.7621°N 73.5943°E
- System: Pune Suburban Railway station
- Owner: Indian Railways
- Line: Pune Suburban Railway
- Platforms: 2
- Tracks: 2

Construction
- Parking: Yes

Other information
- Status: Active
- Station code: KNHE
- Fare zone: Central Railway

Services
Preceding station	Pune Suburban Railway	Following station
Kamshet towards Lonavala	Lonavala Line	Vadgaon towards Pune Junction
Location
- Location within India Location within Maharashtra

Kanhe Station is a railway station of Pune Suburban Railway on Mumbai–Chennai line.

Local trains between Pune Junction–Lonavala, Shivaji Nagar–Lonavala stop here.

The only passenger train having stop on this station is the Pune Junction–Karjat Passenger.

The station has two platforms and a foot overbridge. There is a small market nearby the railway station for groceries, fast foods and household items.

A roadway to industrial areas beside the railway station crossing.
