= Uruli railway station =

Railway station in Uruli Kanchan, India

General information
- Location: Uruli Kanchan, Haveli, Pune; India
- Coordinates: 18.4938°N 74.1372°E
- Elevation: 552.00 metres (1,811.02 ft)
- System: Indian Railways station
- Owner: Indian Railways
- Lines: Dadar–Solapur section Mumbai–Chennai line
- Platforms: 2
- Tracks: 4
- Connections: Auto stand

Construction
- Parking: Yes
- Cycle facilities: No

Other information
- Station code: URI
- Fare zone: Central Railway
Location
- Location within India Location within Maharashtra

Uruli railway station is a small railway station in Pune district, Maharashtra. Its code is URI. It serves Uruli Kanchan a suburban area of the city. The station consists of two platforms. Some part of the platform is sheltered. Basic facilities like water, sanitation are available.This station is only suitable for local travelling within Pune City. There is also plan to start suburban trains on Pune–Daund section. This station will be a major station for Pune–Daund suburban trains.

== See also ==
- Pune Junction
- Shivaji Nagar
- Khadki
- Pune Suburban Railway
