= Ghorpuri =

Village in Maharashtra

Area
  - Total: 21.52 km^{2} (8.31 sq mi)

Ghorpuri (Ghorpadi) is a village in Pune City, Pune district in the Indian state of Maharashtra.

== Demographics ==
Its population is 2,109.

== Amenities ==
Many bungalows in Ghorpuri are owned by British colonies. Nearby organizations include the National War Museum and the Army Public School.

== Education ==
Schools in Ghorpuri include St. Joseph High School, Ghorpuri Village High School, Swami Vivekanand, Basant, Saraswati Vidyalaya, and Shahid Bhagat Singh High School, Army Public school.

== Religion ==
Shrinath Mhaskoba temple is a notable place in the Ghorpuri area.

Ghorpuri is home to St. Joseph's Catholic Church and St. Mary's Orthodox Syrian Church.

Ahle Sunnat Jama Masjid is the oldest mosque in Ghorpuri Area.

== Transport ==
A railway station is present.

== Health care ==
Ghorpuri is home to Talyan Home Nursing & First Aid Training Center. Nursing homes include Dr Bumb Nursing Home, Usha Nursing Home, and Dr. Shobha Ahuja Nursing Home.

Ghorpuri is home to Matruseva Hospital, Sanjeevani Hospital, and many others.

Ghorpuri hosts Aakash Eye Clinic And Laser Centre, Neo Vision Eye Care, and many others.
