= Pimpri railway station =

Railway station in Pimpri, India

Pimpri पिंपरी रेल्वे स्थानक
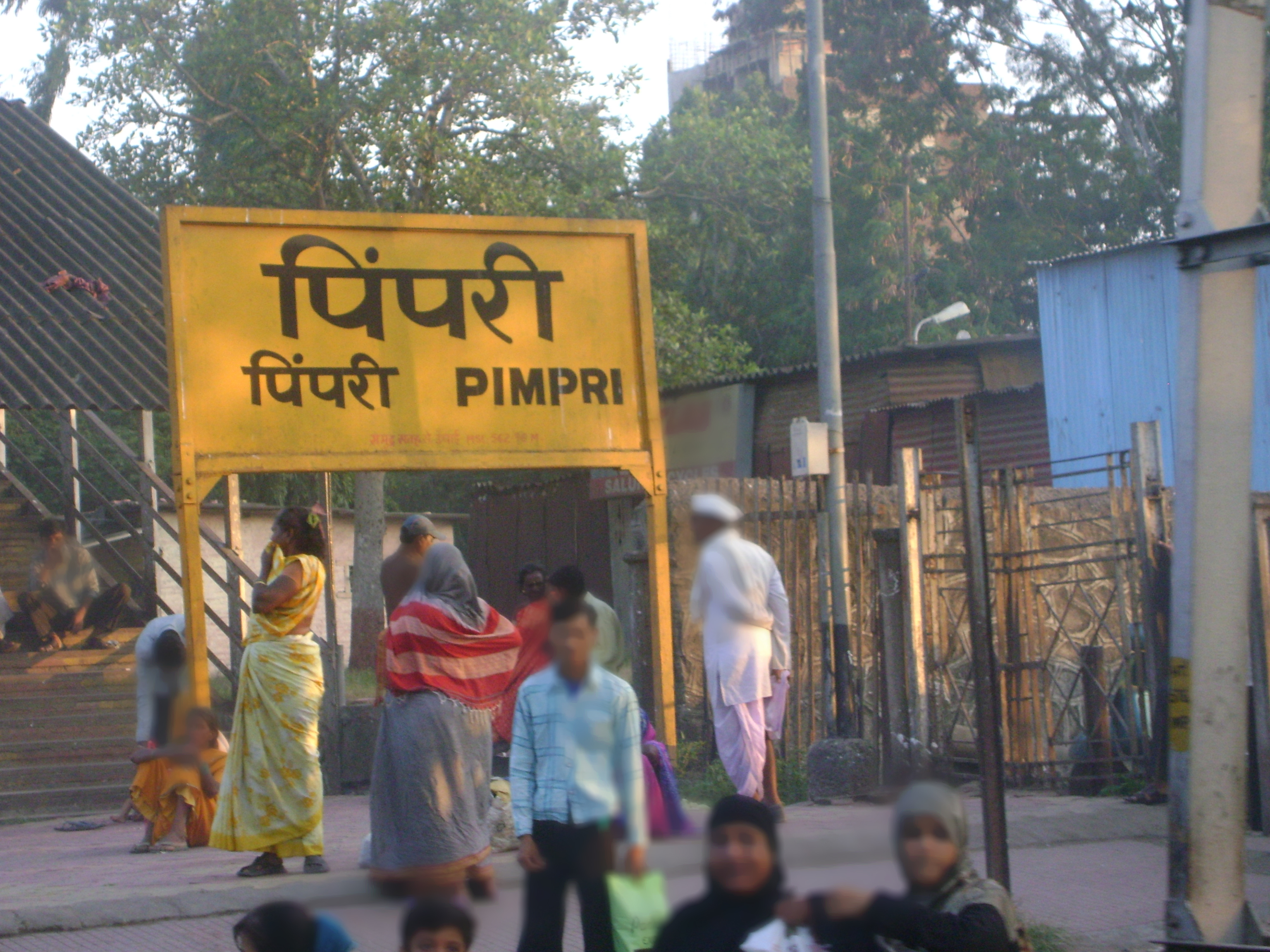

General information
- Location: Pimpri Gaon, Pune. India
- Coordinates: 18.6232°N 73.8022°E
- System: Pune Suburban Railway station
- Owner: Indian Railways
- Line: Pune Suburban Railway
- Platforms: 2
- Tracks: 2

Construction
- Parking: Yes

Other information
- Status: Active
- Station code: PMP
- Fare zone: Central Railway

Services
Preceding station	Pune Suburban Railway	Following station
Chinchwad towards Lonavala	Lonavala Line	Kasarwadi towards Pune Junction
Location
- Interactive map

Pimpri railway station or Pimpri station is a railway station in the Pimpri area. It is located near the Pimpri vegetable market. This station is on Mumbai–Pune main line. This station has two platforms and two footbridges. All suburban trains halt at Pimpri station. Two express trains i.e., Sinhagad Express and Sahyadri Express halt at this station. The passenger trains traveling from Mumbai to Bijapur/Pandharpur/Shirdi also halt here and also Pune–Karjat passenger halts here.

The station also houses a State Bank of India (SBI) ATM Centre located near the ticket counter. Pimpri Colony Post Office (Pin Code 411017) is situated just outside the railway station, about half a minute's walk from the ticket counter.

== Trains ==
=== Down trains ===
Train name	Time of arrival	Time of departure	Frequency
1009 Sinhagad Express	17:50	17:52	Daily
1023 Sahyadri Express	21:16	21:18	Daily

=== Up trains ===
Train name	Time of arrival	Time of departure	Frequency
1010 Sinhagad Express	06:28	06:31	Daily
1024 Sahyadri Express	07:39	07:40	Daily

=== Suburban trains ===
Train name	Timings	Frequency
Lonavla Local	00:38, 04:48, 06:08, 06:53, 08:23, 10:28, 11:23, 12:23, 13:23, 16:03, 16:53, 18:03, 18:38, 19:23, 20:23, 21:33, 22:33	Daily
Pune Local	05:56, 07:12, 08:17, 08:30, 09:12, 10:25, 11:12, 12:47, 14:56, 15:53, 16:25, 16:42, 18:17, 19:17, 20:32, 21:37, 22:42, 23:12, 00:17, 00:42	Daily
Talegaon Local	07:18, 09:23, 15:23	Daily
