= Baramati railway station =

Railway Station in Maharashtra, India

General information
- Location: Bhigwan Road, Baramati, Maharashtra; India
- Coordinates: 18.1537°N 74.5782°E
- Elevation: 553 metres (1,814 ft)
- System: Indian Railways station
- Owner: Indian Railways
- Platforms: 2
- Tracks: 3
- Connections: Auto stand

Construction
- Structure type: Standard (on ground station)
- Parking: Yes

Other information
- Status: Functioning
- Station code: BRMT
- Zone(s): Central Railway
- Division(s): Pune Railway Division

Passengers
- 6000
Location
- Location within India Location within Maharashtra

Baramati railway station is a railway station in Pune district. Its code is BRMT. It serves Baramati city. The station consists of two platforms. It comes under Central Railways division of Indian Railways.

== Trains ==
Some of the trains that runs from Baramati are:

- Baramati–Pune Passenger
- Baramati–Daund Passenger (unreserved)
- Baramati–Daund Shuttle (unreserved)
- Baramati–Karjat Passenger (unreserved)
- Baramati–Pune Shuttle (unreserved)

== Future ==
Baramati railway station lacks a lot of facilities. In a few years, the station might go through redevelopment. There will be a new rail line connection from Phaltan to Baramati so that trains from Kolhapur and Hubli section can freely go towards Manmad, as these train currently change to the reverse direction in Pune and Daund.

Some redevelopment might contain:

- expansion of two more platforms and sheltering the existing platform.
- construction of an electric loco shed as the Lonand to Phaltan rail line is still a diesel line.
