= Sangawi railway station =

Railway station in India

General information
- Location: Milindnagar, Sangawi, Maharashtra; India
- Coordinates: 18.0623°N 74.4783°E
- Elevation: 528 metres (1,732 ft)
- System: Indian Railways station
- Owner: Indian Railways
- Platforms: 1
- Tracks: 2
- Connections: Auto stand

Construction
- Structure type: Standard (on-ground station)
- Parking: No
- Cycle facilities: No

Other information
- Status: Construction – new line
- Station code
- Zone(s): Central Railway
- Division(s): Pune
Location
- Location within India Location within Maharashtra

Sangawi railway station is a small railway station in Pune district, Maharashtra, India. It serves Milindnagar village. The station will consists of two platforms. The station is under-construction and lies on the Phaltan–Daund line.
