= Vishrambag railway station =

Railway station in maharastra, India

Vishrambag

General information
- Location: Vishrambag, Sangli, Sangli district, Maharashtra; India
- Coordinates: 16.85057°N 74.602231°E
- Elevation: 565 metres (1,854 ft)
- System: Indian Railways station
- Owner: Indian Railways
- Operator: Indian Railways
- Line: Pune–Miraj–Londa line
- Platforms: 1
- Tracks: broad gauge

Construction
- Structure type: Standard (on ground)

Other information
- Status: Functioning
- Station code: VRB
- Zone(s): CR
- Division(s): Pune
Location
- Interactive map

Vishrambag railway station is a railway station located on the Pune–Miraj–Londa railway line operated by the Central Railway Zone under Pune railway division. It is situated at Vishrambag, Sangli in Sangli district in the Indian state of Maharashtra.
