= Malavli railway station =

Railway Station in Maharashtra, India

Malavli

General information
- Location: Malavli, Tal. Maval, Dist. Pune. India
- Coordinates: 18.7443°N 73.4806°E
- System: Pune Suburban Railway station
- Owner: Indian Railways
- Line: Pune Suburban Railway
- Platforms: 2
- Tracks: 4

Construction
- Parking: Yes

Other information
- Status: Active
- Station code: MVL
- Fare zone: Central Railway

Services
| Preceding station | Pune Suburban Railway | Following station |
|---|---|---|
| Lonavala Terminus | Lonavala Line | Kamshet towards Pune Junction |
Location
- Location within India Location within Maharashtra

Malavli Station is a railway station of Pune Suburban Railway on Mumbai–Chennai line.

The station has two platforms and a foot overbridge. Nearby attractions are two famous hilly forts: Lohagad Fort and Visapur Fort. Also nearby are the very famous Ekvira Devi Mandir, Karla Caves and Bhaja Caves. Vedanta academy of Swami Parthasarathy is about 200 meters north of the station.

Local trains between Pune Junction–Lonavala, Shivaji Nagar–Lonavala stop here. The only passenger train having a stop at this station is the Pune Junction–Karjat Passenger.
