= Khadki railway station =

Railway station in Pune, India

Khadki खडकी रेल्वे स्थानक

General information
- Location: Khadki Cantonment, Pune. India
- Coordinates: 18.5632°N 73.8409°E
- System: Pune Suburban Railway station
- Owner: Indian Railways
- Lines: Pune Suburban Railway; Mumbai–Chennai line
- Platforms: 4
- Tracks: 8

Construction
- Parking: Yes

Other information
- Status: Active
- Station code: KK
- Fare zone: Central Railway

Services
Preceding station	Pune Suburban Railway	Following station
Dapodi towards Lonavala	Lonavala Line	Shivaji Nagar towards Pune Junction
Location

Khadki railway station or Khadki station is on the Mumbai–Pune railway route. It is in the Central Railways zone of Indian Railways. The station code in KK. The station has four platforms from September 2025.

Sinhagad Express, Sahyadri Express, Deccan Express, Koyna Express and Mumbai–Chennai Express stop at this station. It is an electrified station with four platforms, eight lines and one footbridge. The nearest railway station is Pune railway station and nearest airport is Pune International Airport at Lohegaon (Viman Nagar). This is a major halt for military. This makes this an important station on Pune Suburban Railway.

This station is to the east of Khadki auto rickshaw stand and is near Khadki Bazaar. This station was built for access to Khadki Cantonment (Kirkee Cantonment). Even today this station is mostly used for Indian Army. The CAFVD Sports Stadium is in front of this railway station which hosts local association football and field hockey matches.

== Future ==
In future this station will have long-distance trains originating and terminating over here. This will serve as third railway terminal for Pune after Pune JN and Hadapsar terminal.

In April 2025, Rs.35 crore was sanctioned to develop the station.

In June 2025, the Khadki Metro station was opened for public.

== Suburban ==
1. Pune Junction–Lonavala Locals
2. Pune Junction–Talegaon Locals
3. Shivaji Nagar–Lonavala Local
4. Shivaji Nagar–Talegaon Local

== Express/Mails ==
1. Sinhagad Express
2. Sahyadri Express
3. Deccan Express
4. Koyna Express
5. Mumbai–Chennai Express
6. Mumbai–Chennai Mail

== Special Trains ==
1. Indore - Khadki (Pune) special. (This train will have its last departure on 26 November 2025)

== See also ==
- Khadki
- Pune Suburban Railway
- Pune Junction
