= Koregaon railway station =

Railway Station in Maharashtra, India

Koregaon Railway Station

General information
- Location: Koregaon-Satara Road, Koregaon, Maharashtra; India
- Coordinates: 17.6920582°N 74.1488964°E
- Elevation: 658 metres (2,159 ft)
- System: Indian Railways station
- Owner: Indian Railways
- Operator: Pune railway division
- Line: Pune–Miraj line
- Platforms: 2
- Tracks: 3
- Connections: Auto stand

Construction
- Structure type: Standard (on-ground station)
- Parking: yes
- Cycle facilities: No

Other information
- Status: Functioning
- Station code: KRG
- Fare zone: Central Railway
Location
- Location within India Location within Maharashtra

Koregaon railway station is a small railway station serving Koregaon town in Satara district of Maharashtra State of India. It is under Pune railway division of Central Railway zone of Indian Railways. Its code is KRG. The station consists of one platform. The platform is not well sheltered. It lacks many facilities including water and sanitation.

== Trains ==
- Koyna Express
- Maharashtra Express
- Sahyadri Express currently not running after covid
- CSMT Kolhapur–Satara Passenger
- CSMT Kolhapur–Pune Passenger
