= Sasvad Road railway station =

Railway station in India

General information
- Location: Kalepadal railway crossing, Pune, Maharashtra; India
- Coordinates: 18.4728°N 73.9545°E
- Elevation: 590 metres (1,940 ft)
- System: Indian Railways station
- Owner: Indian Railways
- Line: Pune–Miraj line
- Platforms: 2
- Tracks: 5 (Double Electric BG)
- Connections: Auto stand

Construction
- Structure type: Standard
- Parking: Yes
- Cycle facilities: Yes

Other information
- Status: Functioning
- Station code: SSV
- Zone(s): Central Railway
- Division(s): Pune

History
- Rebuilt: Yes
Location

Sasvad Road railway station is a small railway station in Pune district, Maharashtra. Its code is SSV. The station has two brand-new platforms. The platforms are well sheltered. It has facilities including water and sanitation.

Update: 2.0 The Sasvad Road railway station (SSV) is now shifted near Kalepadal level crossing. Doubling and electrification work is completed and both lines are fully functional. We may expect EMUs in near future once all the section is electric. People also refer it as SSV 2.0 as it is moved to another location and it's more convenient to people.

== Trains ==
Some of the trains that run from Saswad are:

- CSMT Kolhapur–Pune Passenger (unreserved)
- Pune–Satara Passenger (unreserved)
