= Bhilawadi railway station =

Railway Station in Maharashtra, India

General information
- Location: Bhilawadi, Sangli, Maharashtra; India
- Coordinates: 17.0081°N 74.5157°E
- Elevation: 573 metres (1,880 ft)
- System: Indian Railways station
- Owner: Indian Railways
- Operator: Pune railway division
- Line: Pune–Miraj–Londa line
- Platforms: 1
- Tracks: 3
- Connections: Auto stand and Bus stand

Construction
- Structure type: Standard (on-ground station)
- Parking: Yes
- Cycle facilities: No

Other information
- Status: Functioning
- Station code: BVQ
- Fare zone: Central Railway
Location
- Location within Maharashtra Location within India

Bhilawadi railway station is a railway station serving Bhilawadi town in Sangli district of Maharashtra State of India. It is under Pune railway division of Central Railway Zone of Indian Railways. Its code is BVQ. The station consists of a single platform. The station is near a large plant of Hindustan Petroleum and India's largest private dairy of Chitale group.

== Trains ==
- Koyna Express
- Maharashtra Express
- Sahyadri Express
- CSMT Kolhapur–Satara Passenger
- CSMT Kolhapur–Pune Passenger
