= Ghorpuri railway station =

Railway Station in Maharashtra, India

General information
- Location: Ghorpuri Down Yard, Pune. India
- Coordinates: 18.5280941°N 73.8918993°E
- Elevation: 558.00 metres (1,830.71 ft)
- System: Indian Railways station
- Owner: Indian Railways
- Lines: Pune–Bangalore; Pune–Miraj–Kolhapur line
- Platforms: 2
- Tracks: 4

Construction
- Parking: No

Other information
- Status: Active
- Station code: GPR
- Fare zone: Central Railway
Location
- Location within India Location within Maharashtra

Ghorpuri railway station is located in Indian city of Pune. It serves Ghorpuri (a suburban area of Pune city). The station code is GPR. It has two platforms.

Very few trains currently halt here. It is about 3.5 km (2.2 mi) from Pune Junction. Currently all passenger trains and some express trains have a scheduled halt at Ghorpuri. Just beside the station is located a diesel locomotive maintenance shed housing more than 200 locomotives for Express trains from Pune and goods trains.

== See also ==
- Pune Suburban Railway
