= Yevat railway station =

Railway station in India

Yevat Railway Station

General information
- Location: Yevat Railway station near old mutha canal, Yevat Tal Daund 412 214, Pune; India
- Coordinates: 18.4892°N 74.2560°E
- Elevation: 539 metres (1,768 ft)
- System: Indian Railways station
- Owner: Indian Railways
- Lines: Dadar–Solapur section Mumbai–Chennai line
- Platforms: 2
- Tracks: 4
- Connections: Auto stand

Construction
- Parking: No
- Cycle facilities: No

Other information
- Status: Active
- Station code: YT
- Fare zone: Central Railway
Location
- Location within India Location within Maharashtra

Yevat railway station is a suburban railway station in Pune district, Maharashtra. Its code is YT. It serves Yevat, a suburban area of the city. The station consists of two platforms. The platforms are connect by a sturdy foot-over-bridge. It has basic facilities, however it is scenic. It serves as the closest railway station to visit the beautiful Hindu temple of Bhuleshwar dedicated to Lord Shiva.

== Trains ==
Trains passing through Yewat:

- Pune–Baramati Passenger
- Pune–Baramati–Daund–Pune Passenger
- Pune–Daund Passenger
- Pune–Daund Passenger
- Pune–Daund Fast Passenger
- Pune–Manmad Passenger
- Pune–Nizamabad Passenger
- Pune–Solapur Passenger
- Pune–Solapur Passenger
