= Karad railway station =

Railway Station in Maharashtra, India

General information
- Location: Karad, Satara district, Maharashtra; India
- Coordinates: 17.309894°N 74.216605°E
- Elevation: 596 m (1,955 ft)
- Operator: Indian Railways; Central Railway Zone; Pune railway division
- Line: Pune–Miraj–Londa line
- Platforms: 3
- Tracks: 3

Other information
- Station code: KRD
- Fare zone: Central Railways

History
- Electrified: Partially
Location
- Location within India Location within Maharashtra

Karad railway station is a railway station serving Karad city, in Satara district of Maharashtra State of India. It is under Pune railway division of Central Railway Zone of Indian Railways.

It is located at 596 m above sea level and has three platforms. As of 2018, a single broad gauge railway line exists and at this station, 39 trains stop. Kolhapur Airport is at distance of 76 kilometers.
