= Lonand =

- City
- Location in Maharashtra, India
- Coordinates: 18.0404°N 74.1872°E
- Country: India
- State: Maharashtra
- District: Satara
- Founder: Shelake patil

Government
  - Body: Municipal Council
- Elevation: 597 m (1,959 ft)

Population
  - Total: 45,494
- Demonym: Lonandkar

Language
  - Official: Marathi
- Time zone: UTC+5:30 (IST)
- PIN: 415521
- Telephone code: +91-02169
- Vehicle registration: MH-11
- Website: www.satara.gov.in/en/public-utility/municipal-council-lonand/

Lonand is a city and municipal council in Satara district, Maharashtra. It is 227km from Mumbai, 81km from Pune, 47km from Wai and Satara, 179km from Sangli and 30km from Phaltan.

The Karad railway station is in Lonand.

== Geography ==
Lonand is located at 18.0404°N 74.1872°E. It has an average elevation of 597 metres (1961 feet). It is situated on the banks of Khemavati river at the border of Pune district and Satara district.
