= Jejuri railway station =

Railway Station in Maharashtra, India

General information
- Location: Jejuri–Baramati Road, Jejuri, Pune; India
- Coordinates: 18.2872°N 74.1717°E
- Elevation: 539.00 metres (1,768.37 ft)
- System: Indian Railways station
- Owner: Indian Railways
- Operator: Indian Railways; Central Railway zone Pune railway division
- Line: Pune–Miraj–Londa line
- Platforms: 2
- Tracks: 5
- Connections: Auto stand, Bus

Construction
- Parking: Yes

Other information
- Station code: JJR
- Fare zone: Central Railway
Location
- Location within India Location within Maharashtra

Jejuri railway station is a station in the Pune district of Maharashtra, India. Its code is JJR. It serves Jejuri, a town known for the main temple of Lord Khandoba.

== Details ==
The station consists of two platforms. This station connects Jejuri with major Indian cities such as Mumbai, Pune, Nagpur, Kolhapur, Goa through express trains. The station lies on the Pune–Miraj line of the Central Railways and is administered by the Pune railway division.

The station has facilities such as water and sanitation.

== Trains serving the station ==
- Chhatrapati Shahu Maharaj Terminus–Gondia Maharashtra Express†
- Chhatrapati Shahu Maharaj Terminus–Chhatrapati Shivaji Terminus Koyna Express
- Chhatrapati Shahu Maharaj Terminus–Chhatrapati Shivaji Terminus Sahyadri Express
- Pune–Satara Passenger
- Chhatrapati Shahu Maharaj Terminus–Pune Passenger

† – Runs with the Kolhapur–Gondia train up to Bhusaval Junction.
