= Kedgaon, Pune district =

Village in India

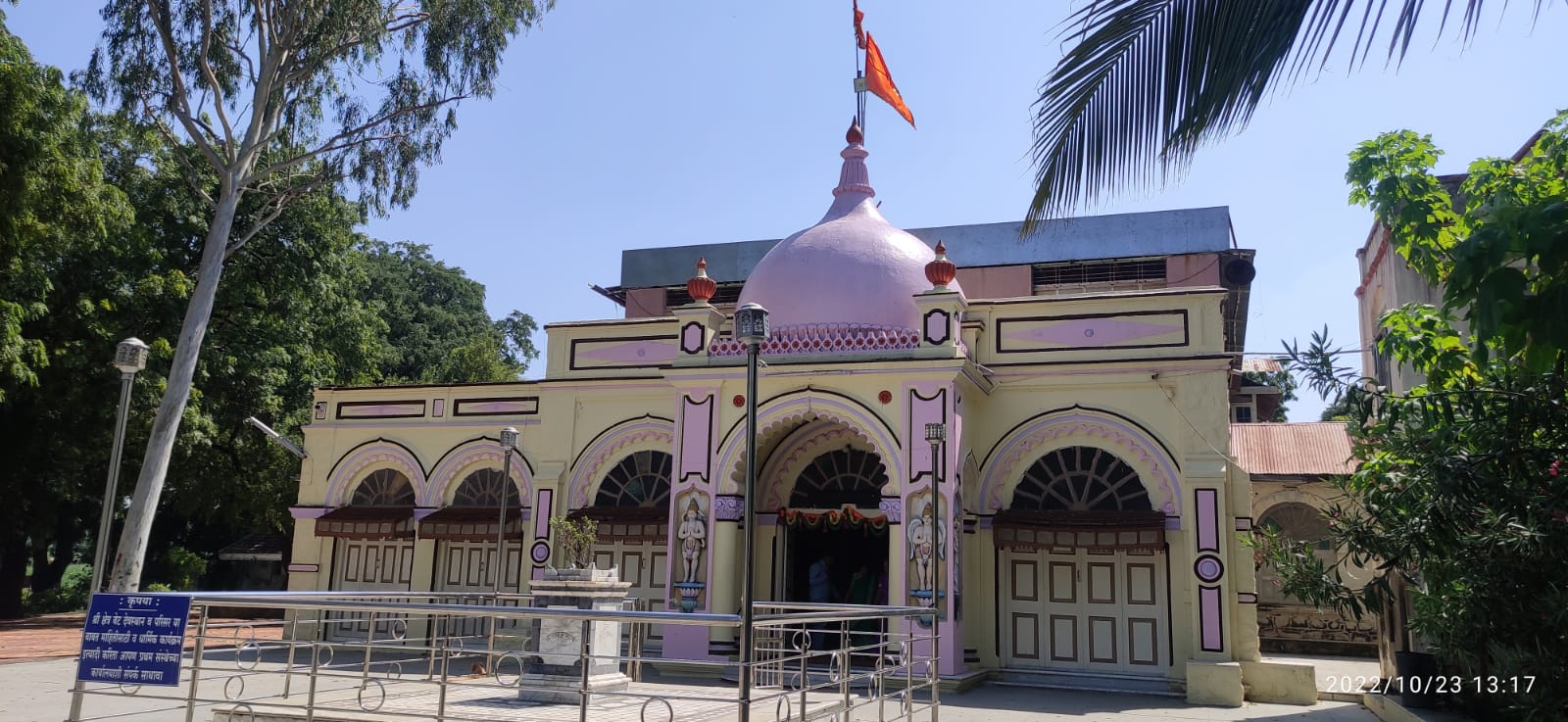
Narayan Maharaj Mandir

Kedgaon is a village in Daund taluka of Pune district thirty miles east of the city of Pune. The village is on the Pune-Daund railway line. Pandita Ramabai Mukti mission, a Christian charity that serves needy women, the disabled, and destitute children is based near the village. Early 20th century Hindu saint Narayan Maharaj also resided in the village. His ashram at Kedgaon bet is a place of pilgrimage for his devotees.
