= Talegaon Dabhade =

- Town
- Location in Maharashtra, India
- Coordinates: 18.72°N 73.68°E
- Country: India
- State: Maharashtra
- District: Pune
- Taluka: Maval (Mawal)

Government
  - Type: Democracy
- Elevation: 670 m (2,200 ft)

Population (2011)
  - Total: 56,435

Language
  - Official Language: Marathi
- Time zone: UTC+5:30 (IST)
- PIN code(s): 410 506 & 410 507
- Area code: +91-2114
- Vehicle registration: MH 14, MH 12
- Vidhan Sabha constituency: Maval (Vidhan Sabha constituency)
- Lok Sabha constituency: Maval

Talegaon is a town on the outskirts of the city of Pune, India.

== Demographics ==
At the 2001 Census of India, Talegaon Dabhade had a population of 42,574. Males constituted 53% of the population and females 47%. The average literacy rate was 79%, higher than the national average of 59.5%: male literacy was 83%, and female literacy was 75%. At that time, 11% of the population was under 6 years of age.

At the 2011 Census of India, the village comprised 13,856 households. The population of 56,435 was split between 29,033 males and 27,402 females.

== Transport ==
Talegaon is served by Talegaon railway station which serves as a terminus for trains running on the Pune Suburban Railway. The station is of two platforms and has four tracks with two footbridges. This serves access to Talegaon Dabhade village and General Motors, Pune plant. PMPML bus services to Alandi, Katraj, Nigadi, Chakan, Vadgaon are available. Private taxies are also available. The major National Highways passing through are NH-4, NH48 AND NH 548 D.

== Weather & Environment ==
Talegaon Dabhade has an altitude of 672 meters from sea level (2200 Ft), and thus enjoys pleasant weather round the year. Situated on the laps of Sahyadri mountain ranges, during monsoon rains, Talegaon Dabhade witnesses heavy rainfall adding to its overall natural beauty. Indrayani River, which originates in Lonavla flows from Talegaon Dabhade. The small city has also 3 lakes, which are full of water round the year, hence the name "Talegaon".

== Notable people ==
This is a list of notable people who were born or have dwelt in Talegaon, India. Only people who are sufficiently notable to have individual entries on Wikipedia have been included in the list.
