= Shivaji Nagar railway station =

Railway station in Pune, India

Shivaji Nagar railway station शिवाजी नगर रेल्वे स्थानक

General information
- Location: Wakdewadi, Shivajinagar, Pune; India
- Coordinates: 18.5326°N 73.8514°E
- Elevation: 550.42 metres (1,805.8 ft)
- System: Pune Suburban Railway station
- Owner: Indian Railways
- Line: Pune Suburban Railway
- Platforms: 3
- Tracks: 5
- Connections: Purple Line Shivaji Nagar

Construction
- Parking: Yes

Other information
- Status: Active
- Station code: SVJR
- Fare zone: Central Railway

Services
Preceding station	Pune Suburban Railway	Following station
Khadki towards Lonavala	Lonavala Line	Pune Junction Terminus
Location

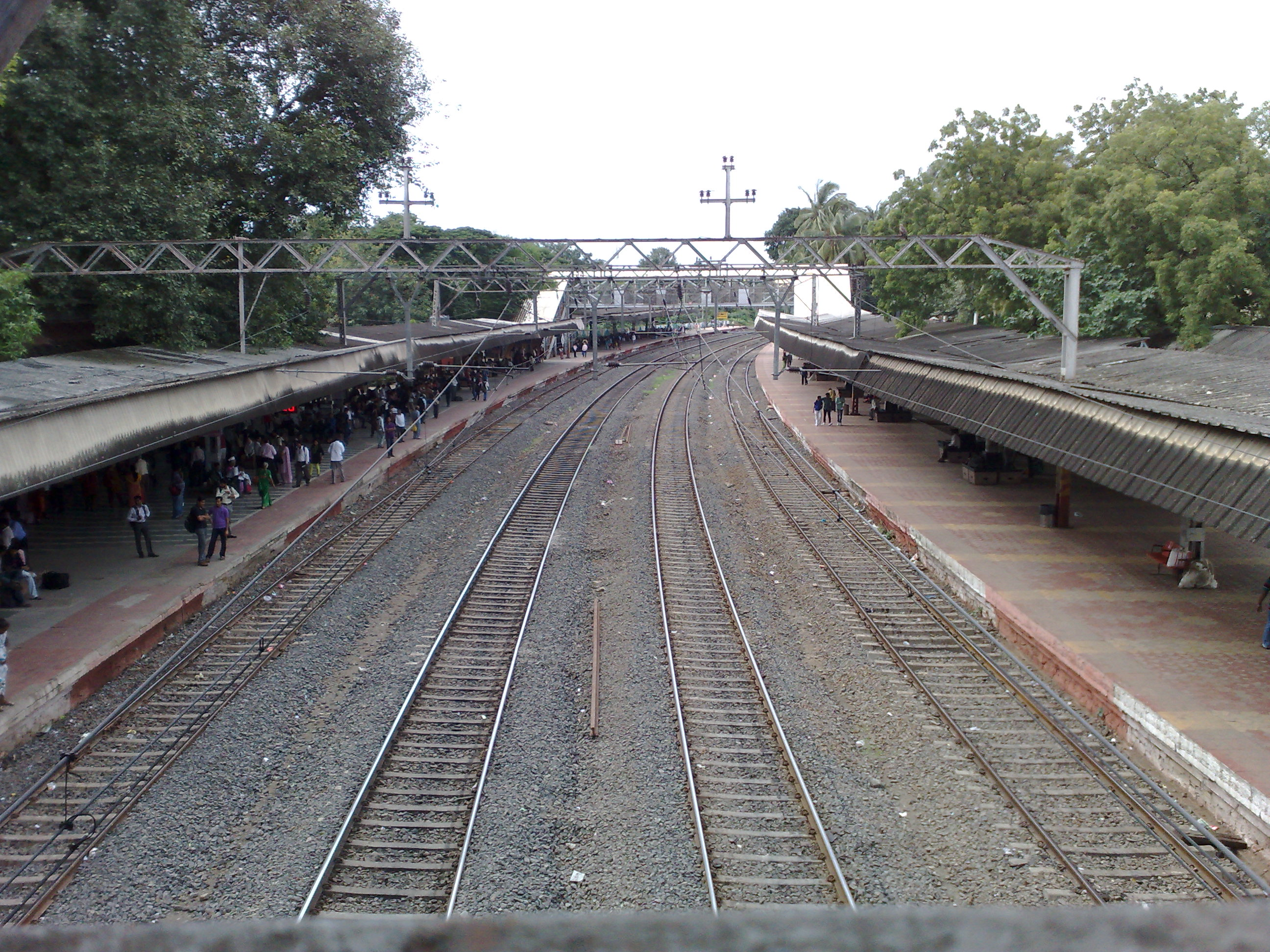
Shivaji Nagar station from overpass

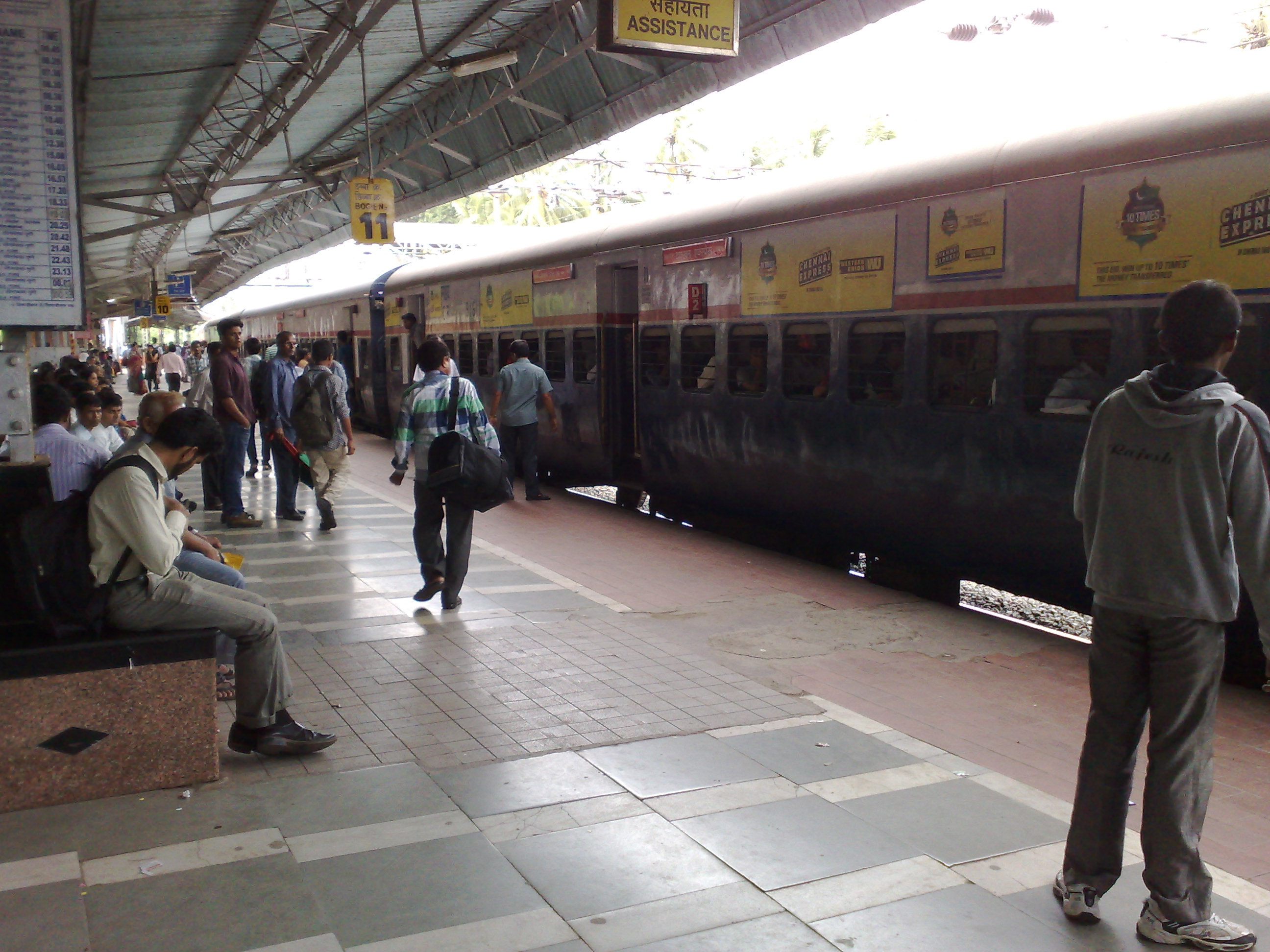
Koyna Express at Shivaji Nagar station

Shivaji Nagar railway station (earlier Bhamburde railway station) is a train station serving Shivajinagar (earlier Bhamburde) suburb of Pune. It has two platforms. This is a halt for suburban trains of Pune. The station is also halt for trains from Mumbai CSMT to Pune Junction. This station is important because this is the nearest railway station to Pune's Session Court and many important building like the College of Engineering, PMC building etc. Trains which halt on this station generally halt for 2 to 3 minutes. The National Highway 48 runs behind the station. This station is just 2 kilometres (1.2 mi) away from Pune Junction.

== Trains ==
=== Express/Mails ===
Train number	Train name	Frequency	Platform
11010	Sinhagad Express (towards Mumbai CSMT)	Daily	1
11089	Bhagat Ki Kothi-Pune Express	Wednesday	2
11091	Bhuj–Pune Express	Thursday	2
11087	Veraval–Pune Express	Sunday	2
22185	Ahimsa Express	Friday	2
11007	Deccan Express (towards Pune JN)	Daily	2
22105	Indrayani Express	Daily	2
12127	Mumbai–Pune Intercity Express	Daily	2
11029	Koyna Express (towards Kolhapur)	Daily	2
11008	Deccan Express (towards Mumbai CSMT)	Daily	1
11030	Koyna Express (towards Mumbai CSMT)	Daily	1
12125	Pragati Express	Daily	2
12123	Deccan Queen Superfast Express	Daily	2
11009	Sinhagad Express (towards Pune JN)	Daily	2

=== Ordinary ===
Train name	Frequency
Karjat–Daund Karjat–Pune Passenger	Daily
Baramati–Karjat Pune–Karjat Passenger	Daily
Mumbai–Bijapur Passenger	Five days
Mumbai–Shirdi Passenger	Daily
Mumbai–Pandharpur Passenger	Two days

=== Train to Navi Mumbai ===
A train service is proposed from this station to Kurla's Lokmanya Tilak Terminus via Navi Mumbai. This train will halt at Lonavala, Karjat, Panvel, Vashi and Belapur stations. The current link from Navi Mumbai is Pragati Express which is run on trial basis between the two cities.

== Suburban trains ==
There are two trains which originate from Shivajinagar for Lonavala and two trains from Lonavala that terminate at Shivajinagar. There are 15 trains which operate between Pune Junction–Lonavala–Pune Junction section and three between Pune Junction–Talegaon Dabhade–Pune Junction section. These trains have their halt at this station.

Platform 1A

A new platform for suburban trains was constructed at this station. This serves as origin & departure of some suburban trains at this stations. This can accommodate 12 coach emu train.

== Expansion ==
A new platform is proposed to be constructed at the station for trains originating and terminating here. This will accommodate the local trains originating and terminating over here. This platform will be constructed near platform no. 1. There are also plans to start long-distance trains from here. Plans are there to construct three multistory buildings dedicated parking lots for vehicles, waiting rooms and commercial outlets at this station. One track will be increased for termination of long-distance trains. Land acquisition will be done on Patil Estate side. This station along with four other stations in Chandigarh, Bijwasan and Anand Vihar Terminal in Delhi and Rani Kamalapati in Bhopal are under development for world-class standard stations.

The existing station will be demolished and new station will be constructed on the site of current station. Roughly 8.5 acres land will be required in addition. The new station will have connectivity to Pune Metro project, National Highway 48 and to neighboring bus stand.

== See also ==
- Pune Junction
- Pune Station Bus Stand
- Swargate bus station
- Shivajinagar, Pune
- Shivajinagar Bus Stand
