= Lonavala railway station =

Railway Station in Maharashtra, India

Lonavala
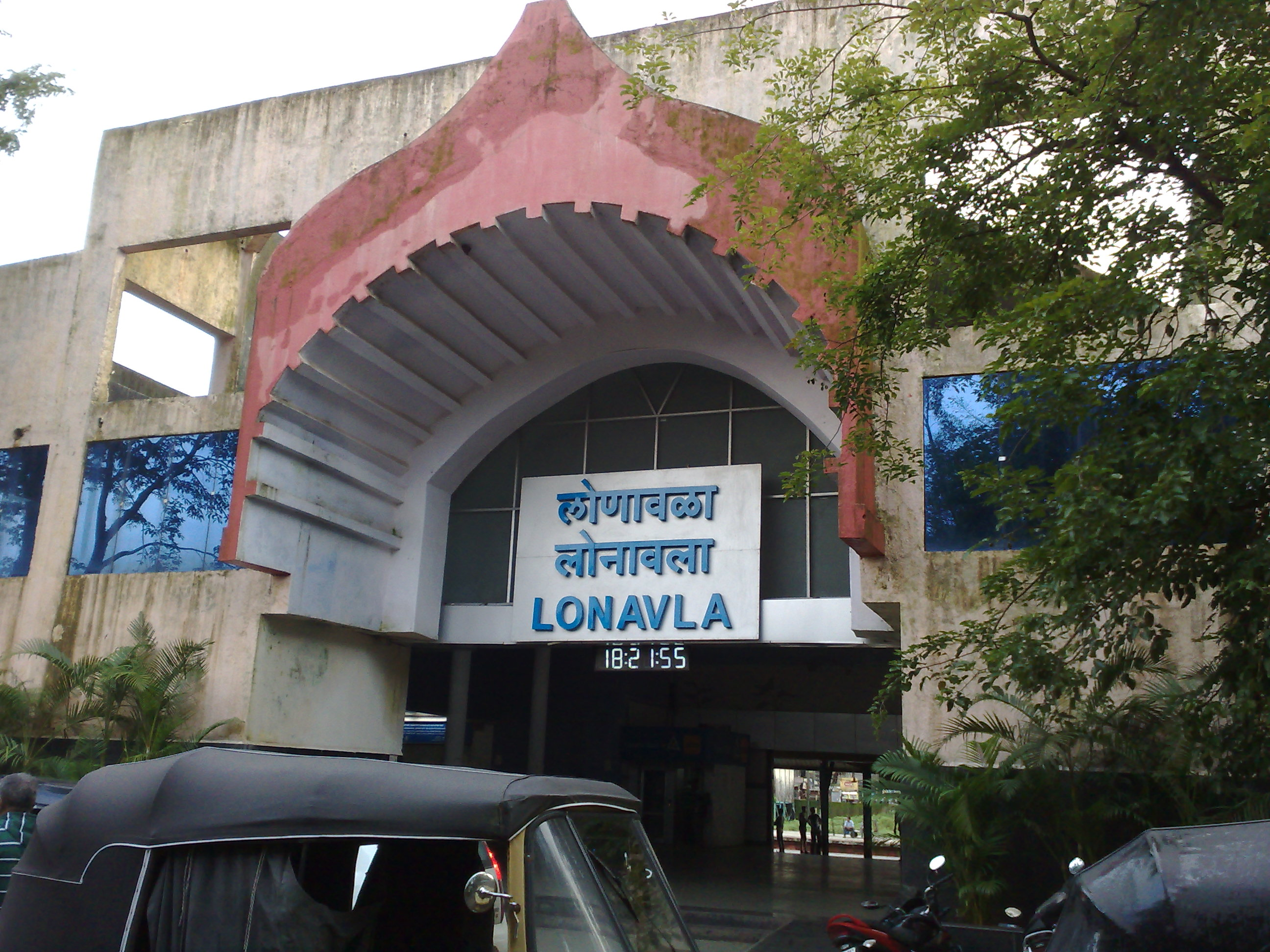

General information
- Location: Lonavala, Tal. Maval, Dist. Pune
- Coordinates: 18°44′57.5″N 73°24′29″E
- Elevation: 622.00 metres (2,040.68 ft)
- System: Pune Suburban Railway station
- Owner: Indian Railways
- Lines: Pune Suburban Railway; Mumbai–Chennai line Mumbai Dadar–Solapur section
- Platforms: 3
- Tracks: 10

Construction
- Parking: Yes

Other information
- Status: Active
- Station code: LNL
- Fare zone: Central Railway

Services
Preceding station	Pune Suburban Railway	Following station
Terminus	Lonavala Line	Malavli towards Pune Junction
Route map
Location
- Location within Maharashtra

Lonavala railway station is a railway station in Lonavala, a hill station in the state of Maharashtra in India. Lonavala station is the origin of Lonavala–Pune Suburban Trains. Seventeen suburban trains operate on the Pune–Lonavala route. Lonavala is also a halt for Mumbai–Pune Express and Mail trains. The Karjat–Pune passenger train also has a halt at Lonavala. Trains traveling on the Kalyan–Pune route also halt at Lonavala. This station leads access to Lonavala town and nearby areas like Karla Caves, Bhaja Caves, Lohagad, Visapur Fort, Bhushi Dam and Bhor Ghat (Khandala Ghat). Khandala hill station is just 8 kilometres (5.0 mi) from Lonavla.

== Infrastructure and Amenities ==
Indian Railways has completely redeveloped and renovated the station, introducing many passenger friendly facilities, such as selfie points, 24*7 cafeteria and lot more amenities. Lonavala Railway Station, serving Lonavala town, is popular for hill station in Maharashtra and falls under Central Railways zone of Indian Railways. Lonavala is also favourite tourist hot spot, hence the need for stronger railway connectivity to serve passengers and tourists. Being one of the attractive destinations for tourists, this railway station has been redeveloped with attractive station infrastructure and advanced passenger-friendly facilities.

Following are some of the salient features of Lonavala Railway station redevelopment project:

1. Around 231 solar panels have been installed at the station for tapping into environment-friendly energy consumption.
2. Two plastic bottle crushing machines have been installed at station premises.
3. One solar water cooler has been installed.
4. Three attractive selfie points have been set up for entertainment purpose.
5. One new pay and park facility has been opened at the station.
6. A rainwater harvesting system has been set up at the station which caters to the eco friendly consumption.
7. Composting plant at the station has been redeveloped for organic decomposition of waste.
8. Concourse area has been renovated by depicting Karla caves and colourful lighting.
9. New 24*7 cafeteria has been opened in platform 2.

== Trains ==
=== Express / Mails ===
1. Ahmedabad–Pune Ahimsa Express
2. Veraval–Pune Express
3. Bhuj–Pune Express
4. Pune–Jodhpur Express
5. Pune–Ernakulam Express (via Panvel)
6. Pune–Jaipur Superfast Express
7. Pune–Bhusaval Express (via Nasik Road)
8. Mumbai CST–Chennai Express
9. Mumbai–Chennai Mail
10. Latur–Mumbai Express
11. Mumbai CST–Solapur Siddheshwar Express
12. Hyderabad–Mumbai Express
13. Mumbai–Hyderabad Hussainsagar Express
14. Dadar–Chennai Egmore Express
15. Mumbai–Bhubaneswar Konark Express
16. Kanyakumari–Mumbai Express
17. Mumbai–Bangalore Udyan Express
18. Dadar Central–Puducherry Chalukya Express
19. Dadar Central–Tirunelveli Chalukya Express
20. Dadar–Mysore Sharavati Express
21. Rajkot–Secunderabad Express
22. Rajkot–Coimbatore Express
23. Lokmanya Tilak Terminus–Coimbatore Express
24. KSR Bengaluru–Jodhpur Express
25. KSR Bangalore–Bhagat Ki Kothi Express (via Guntakal)
26. Gandhidham–Bangalore City Express
27. Lokmanya Tilak Terminus–Madurai Express
28. Mumbai–Nagercoil Express
29. Bhavnagar Terminus–Kakinada Port Express
30. Mahalaxmi Express
31. Mumbai–Machilipatnam Express
32. Ahmedabad–CSMT Kolhapur Express
33. Bhavnagar Terminus–Kakinada Port Express
34. Tiruchirappali-Sri Ganganagar Humsafar Express
35. Ahmedabad-Pune Duronto Express

=== Passengers ===
1. Pune–Karjat Passenger
2. Mumbai CST–Pandharpur Fast Passenger
3. Mumbai CST–Bijapur Fast Passenger
4. Mumbai CST–Sainagar Shirdi Fast Passenger

== Gallery ==
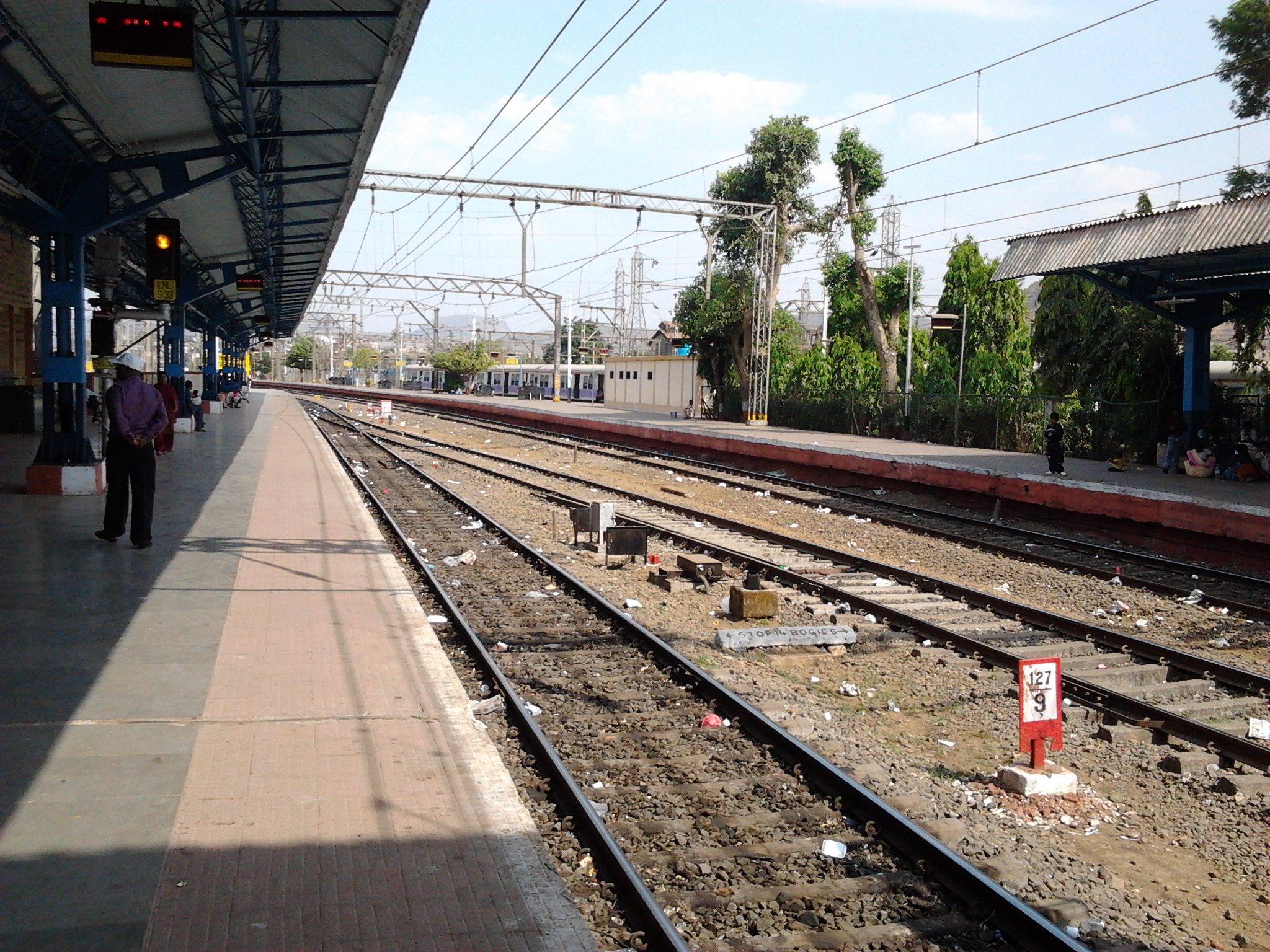
Lonavala station, Platform view

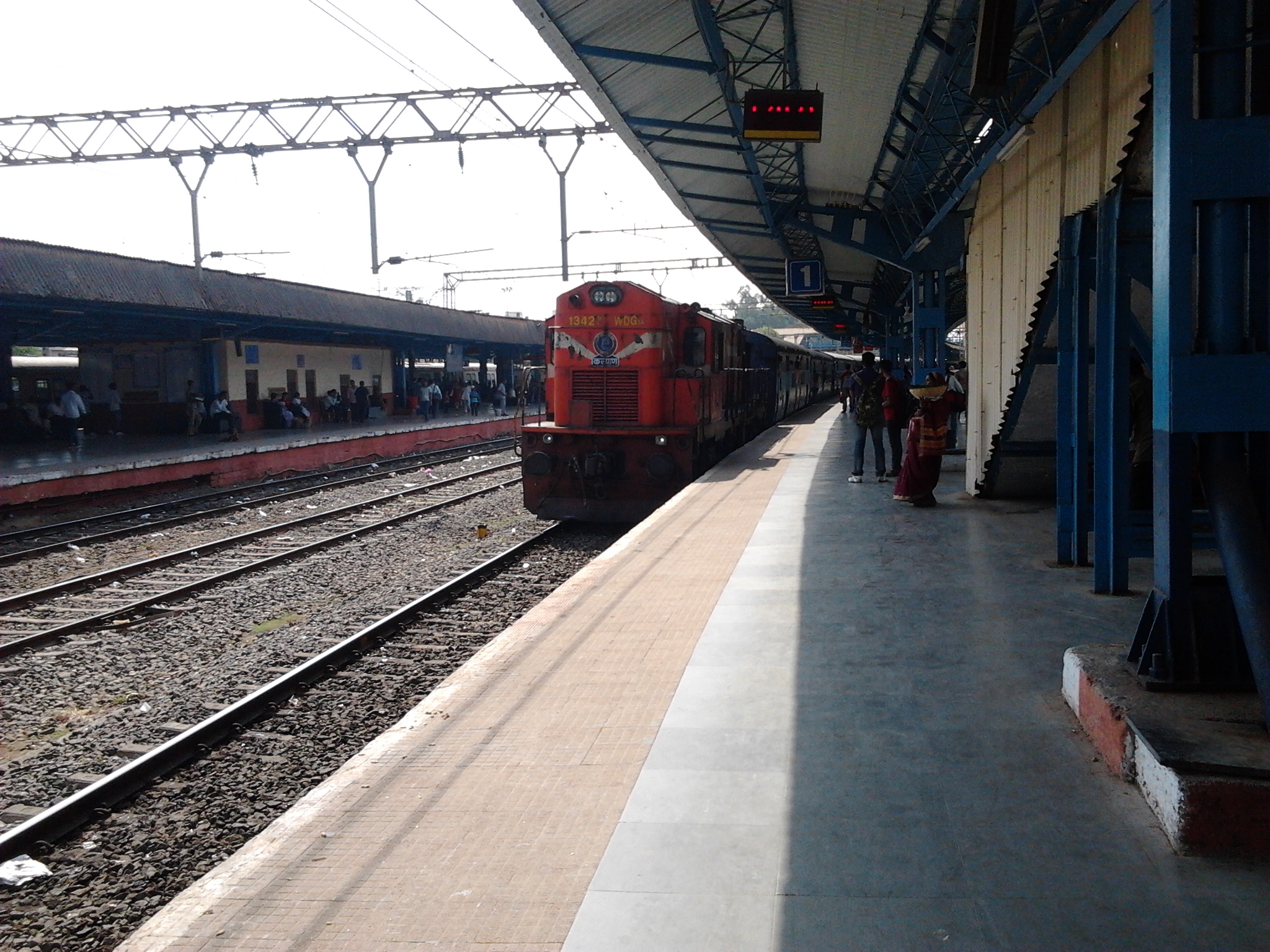
WDG 3A hauled train entering Lonavala station

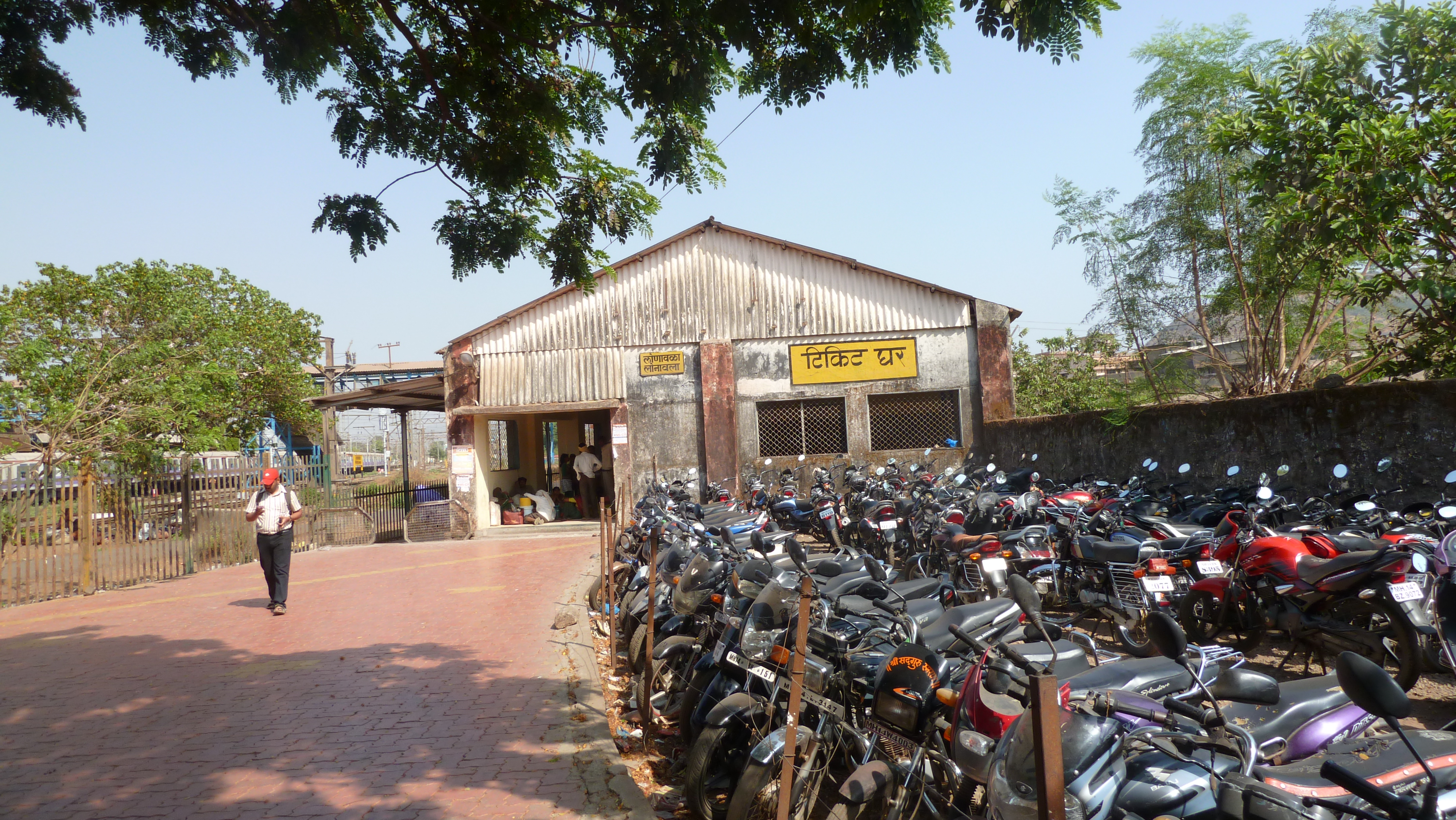
Lonavala station ticket office and parking

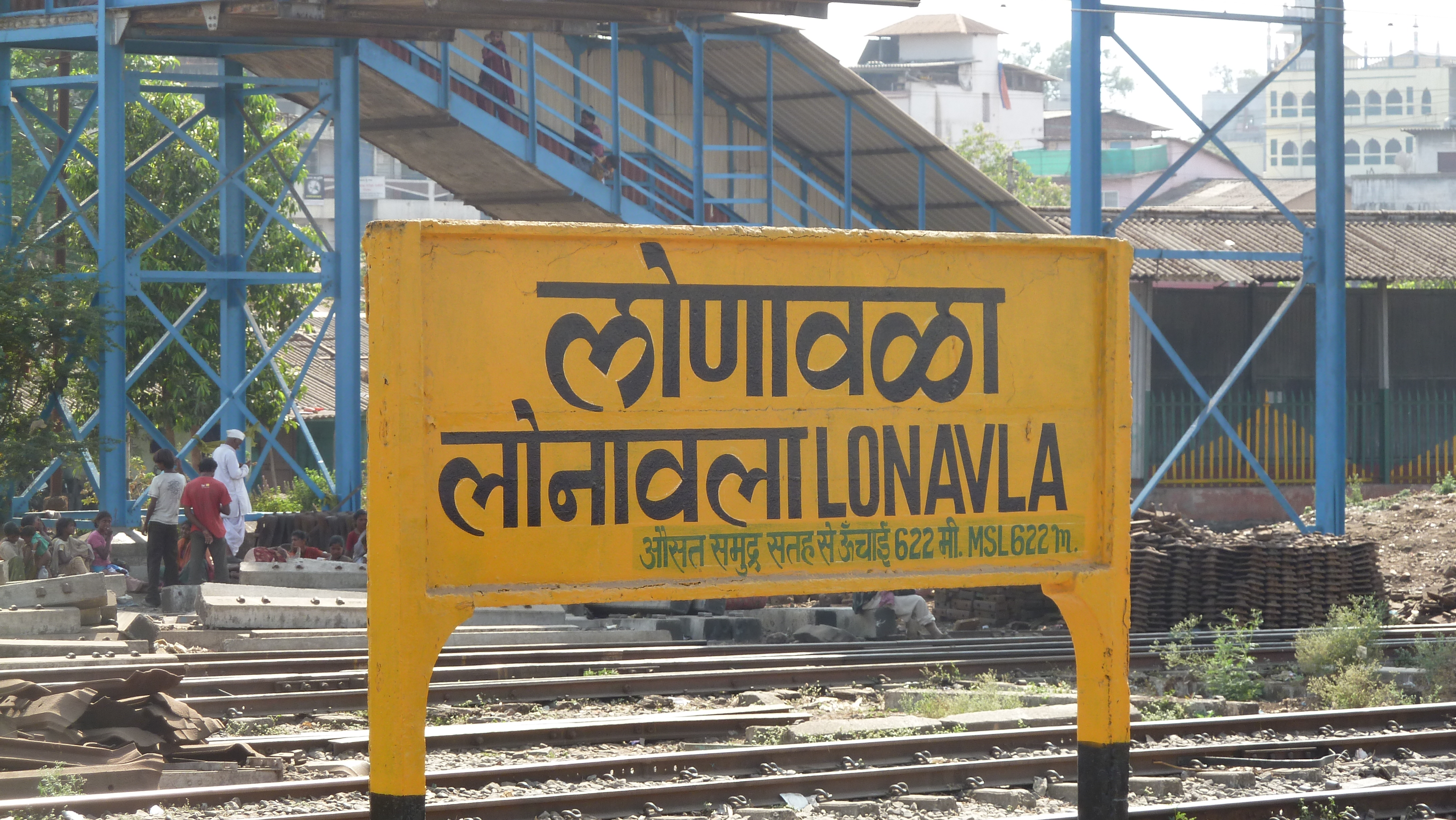
Lonavala station platform board

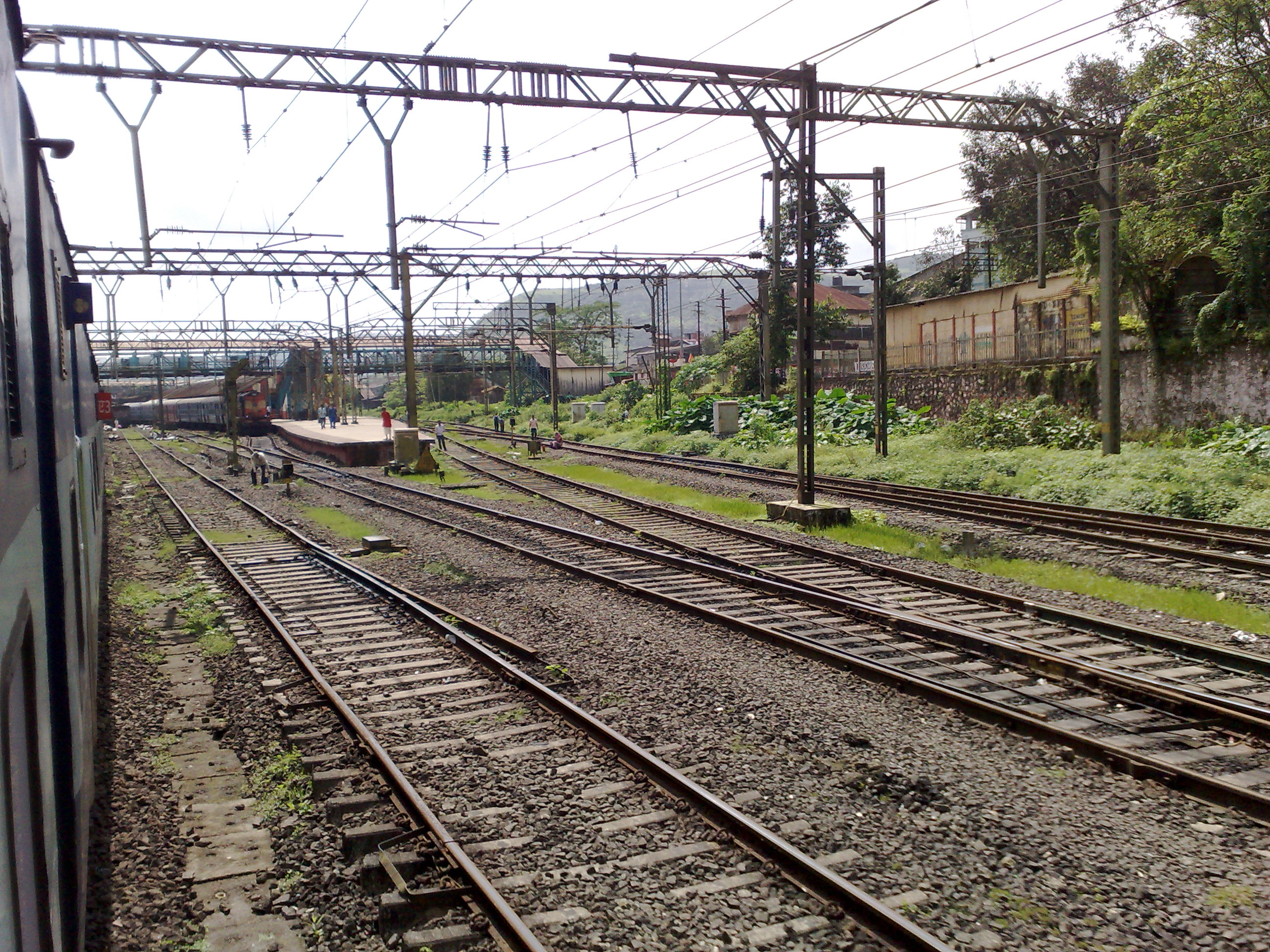
11301 Udyan Express on approach to Lonavala railway station

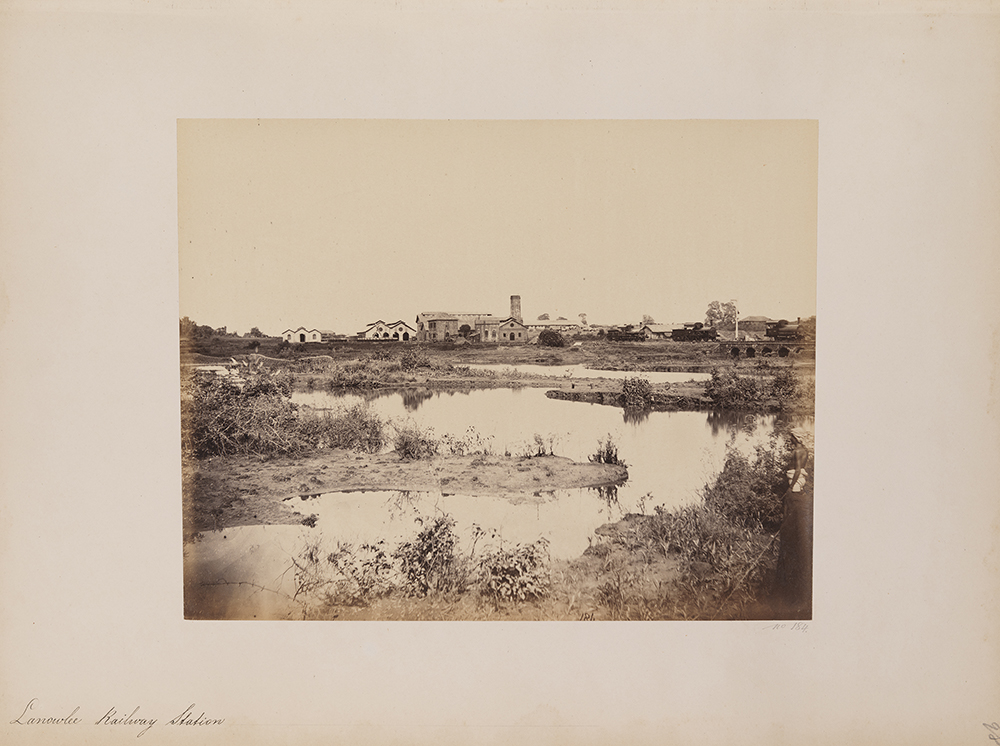
Lanowlee Railway Station, (1855-62)

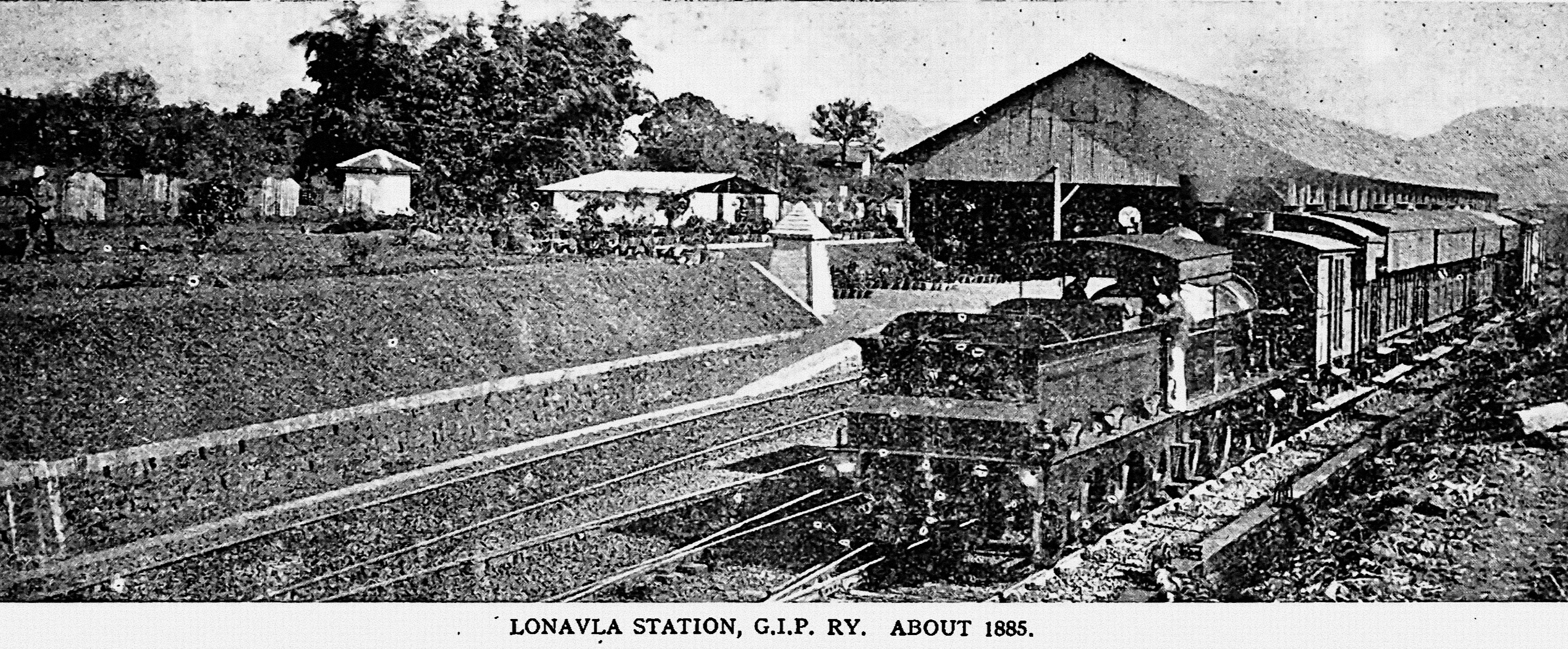
Lonavala station, around 1885

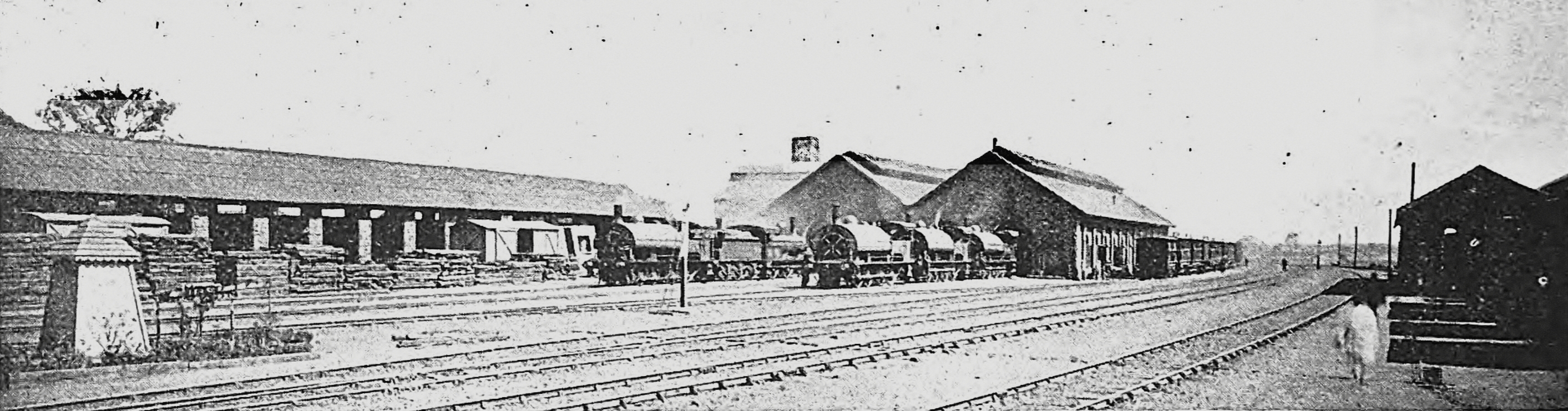
View of the Running Sheds at Lonavala, from Platform, 1885

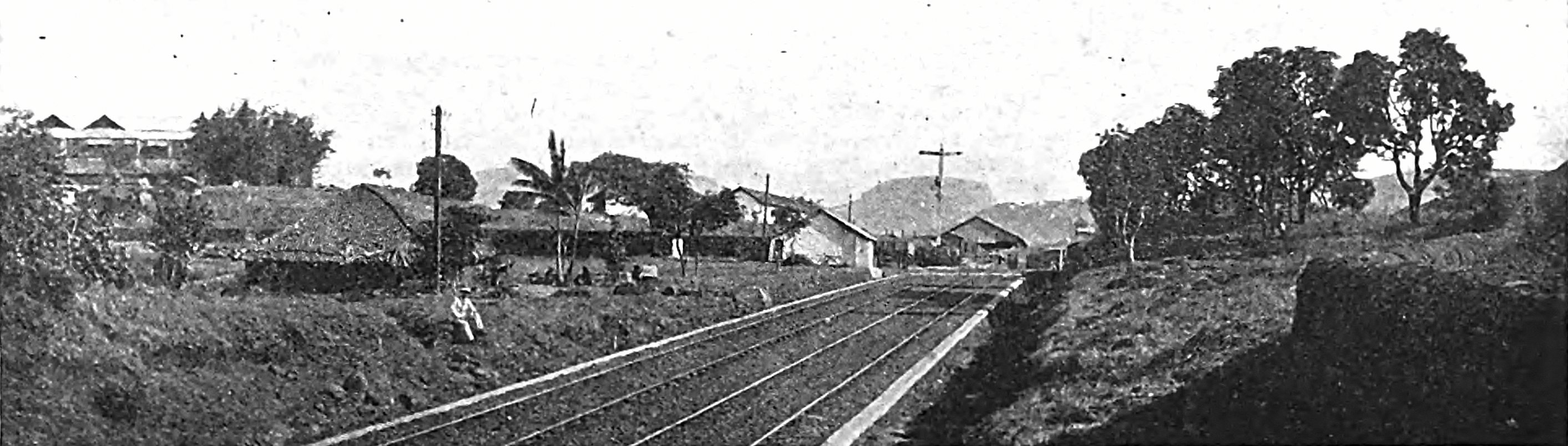
A view of Lonavala railway station from distance
