= Chalukya Express =

Train in India

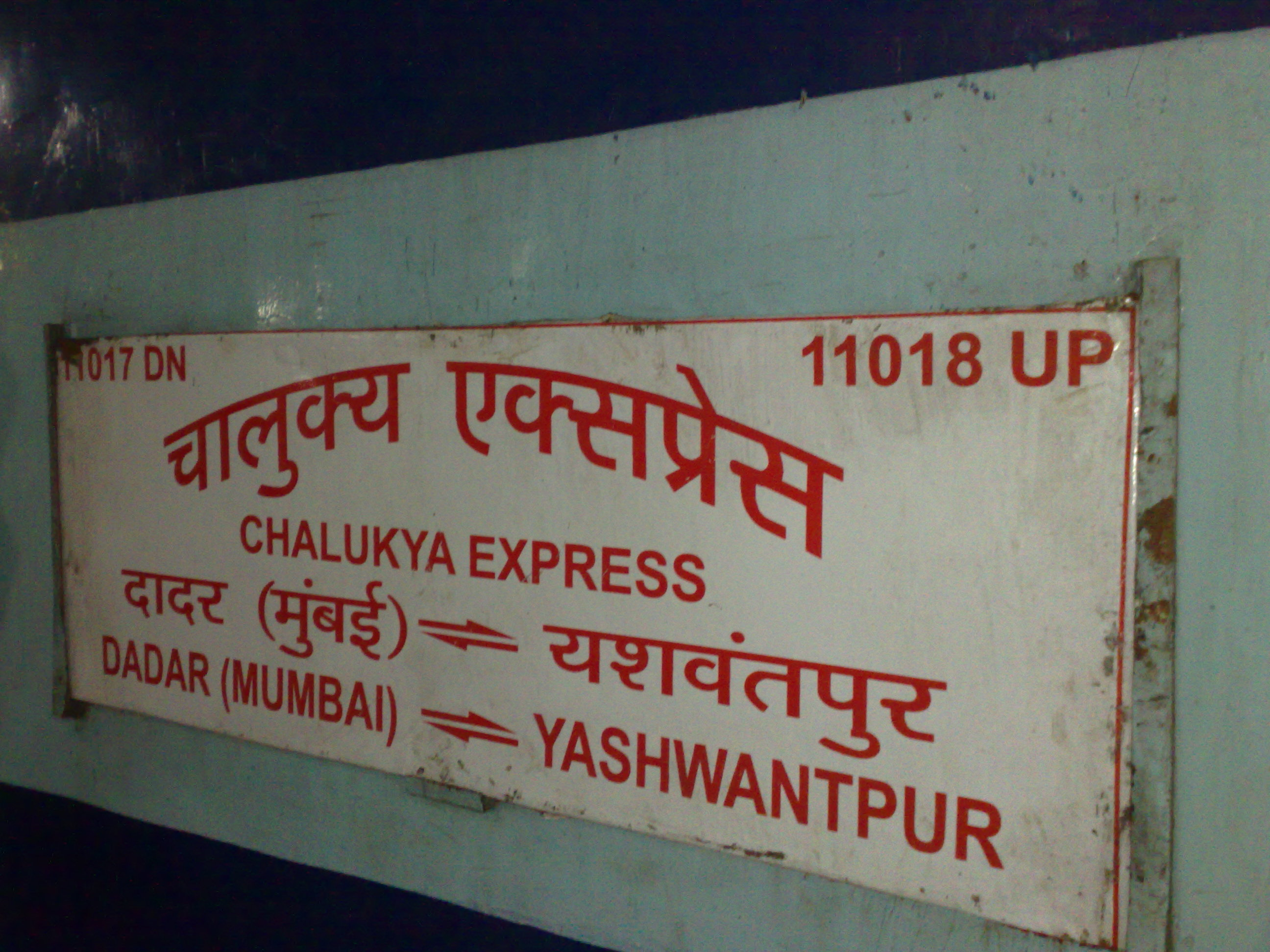
- Train board of Yesvantpur Dadar Chalukya Express

Overview
- Service type: Express
- Locale: Maharashtra, Karnataka & Tamilnadu
- First service: 1996
- Last service: 9 November 2012
- Current operator: Central Railways

Route
- Termini: Dadar (DR); Yesvantpur (YPR)
- Stops: 23
- Distance travelled: 1,207 km (750 mi)
- Average journey time: 23 hours 20 minutes
- Service frequency: Runs six days in a week for every direction
- Train number: 11017 / 11017

On-board services
- Classes: AC 2 tier, AC 3 tier, Sleeper Class, General Unreserved
- Seating arrangements: Yes
- Sleeping arrangements: Yes
- Catering facilities: On-board catering E-catering
- Baggage facilities: Below the seats

Technical
- Rolling stock: ICF coach
- Track gauge: 1,676 mm (5 ft 6 in)
- Operating speed: 52 km/h (32 mph) average including halts

The 11017 / 11018 Dadar–Yesvantpur Chalukya Express was an express train of the Indian Railways connected Yesvantpur Junction in Karnataka and Dadar of Mumbai, Maharashtra. It was operated as 11017/11018 train numbers on six days a week.

== History ==
This train gets its name from the Chalukya dynasty that ruled the Karnataka region. This train ran between Maharashtra and the Karnataka region, following a Arsikere–Hubballi–Belagavi–Miraj route, giving a panoramic view of rural Karnataka.

It operated 6 days per week in each direction. The train covers the distance in 23 hrs 20 minutes. This route is longer and comprises certain ghats. After 15 Oct 2012, it was extended up to Puducherry and Tirunelveli with tri-weekly days each. It shared rake (Coaches) with Sharavati Express and subsequent trains Puducherry and Tirunelveli followed the same

== Route and halts ==
- Dadar (21:30 Down, 5:50 Up)
- Kalyan Junction
- Pune Junction
- Satara
- Sangli
- Miraj Junction

Maharashtra – Karnataka State Border

- Belagavi
- Londa Junction
- SSS Hubballi junction
- Davangere
- Arsikere Junction
- Yesvantpur Junction (20:50 Down, 06:30 Up)

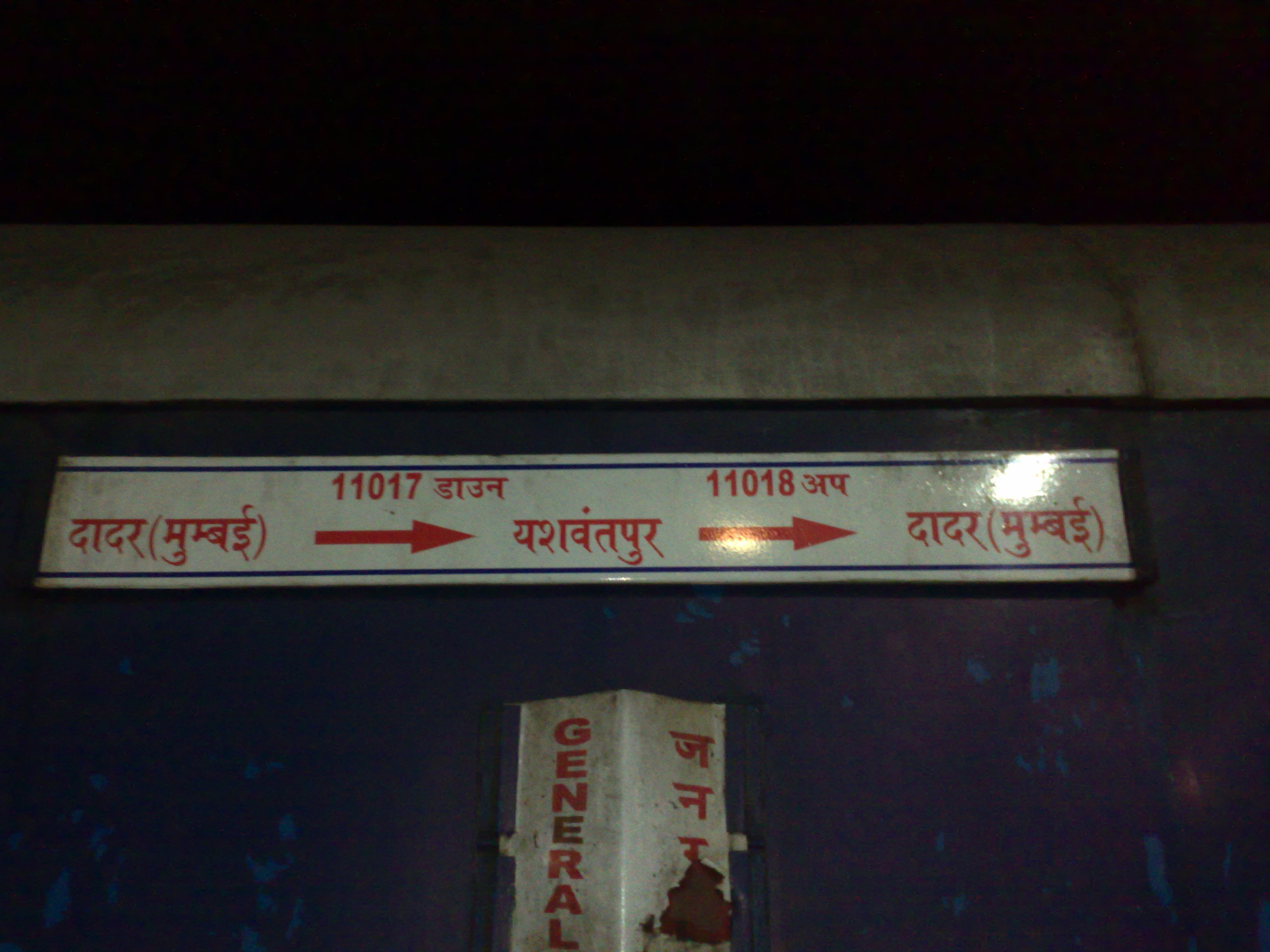
Train board of Yesvantpur Dadar Chalukya Express in Hindi

== Traction ==
it was hauled by WDG-4 or WDP-4 end to end

== See also ==
- Dadar–Puducherry Chalukya Express
- Dadar–Tirunelveli Chalukya Express
