= Sharavati Express =

Train in India

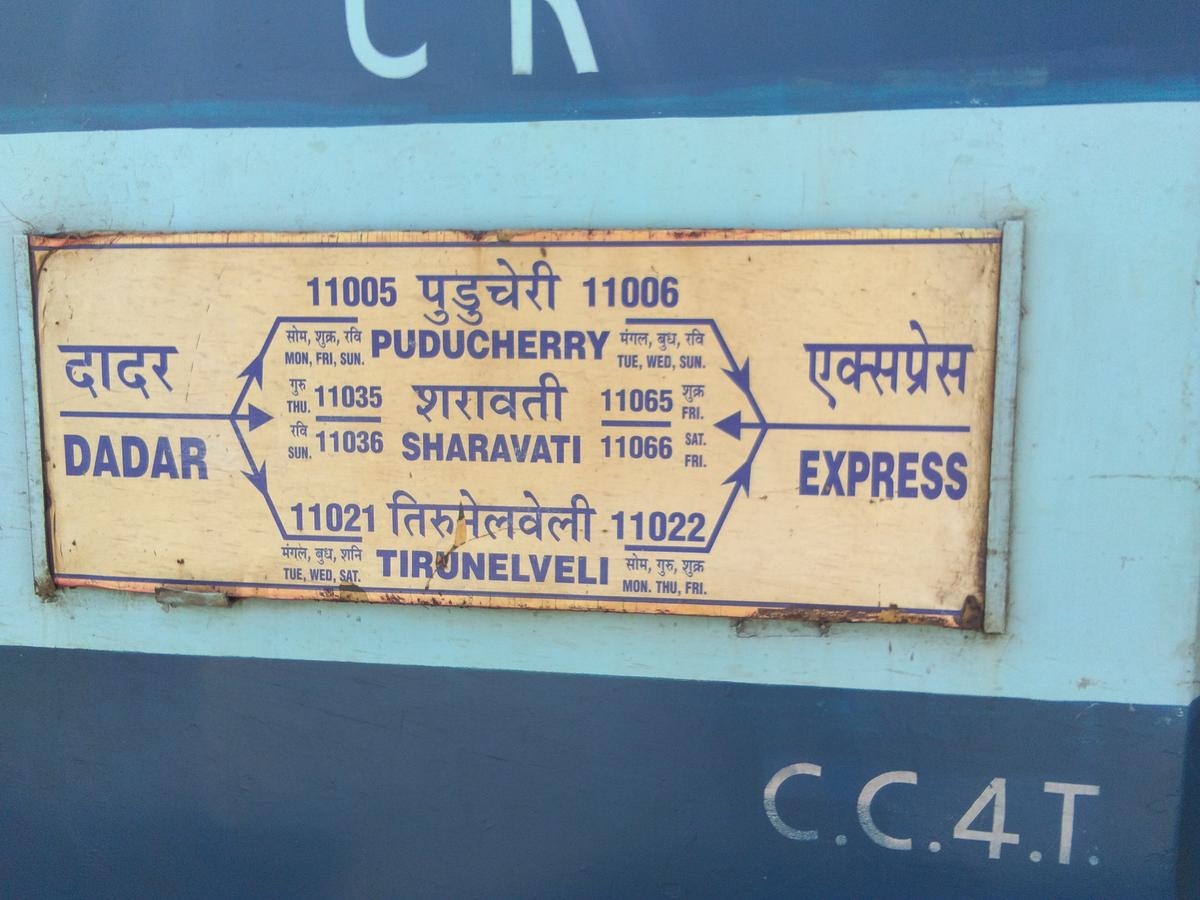
- Sharavati Express train board

Overview
- Service type: Express
- First service: 15 August 1998; 28 years ago
- Current operator: Central Railways

Route
- Termini: Dadar (DR); Mysuru (MYS)
- Stops: 25
- Distance travelled: 1,211 km (752 mi)
- Average journey time: 23 hrs 30 mins
- Service frequency: Weekly
- Train number: 11035 / 11036

On-board services
- Classes: AC 2 Tier, AC 3 Tier, Sleeper Class, General Unreserved
- Seating arrangements: Yes
- Sleeping arrangements: Yes
- Catering facilities: Available but No Pantry car
- Observation facilities: Large windows
- Baggage facilities: Available
- Other facilities: Below the seats

Technical
- Rolling stock: ICF coach
- Track gauge: Broad Gauge
- Operating speed: 52 km/h (32 mph) average including halts.

The 11035 / 11036 Sharavati Express is a weekly express train service of Indian Railways between Mysore and Mumbai. This train follows the same time slot as that of Dadar–Puducherry Chalukya Express and Dadar–Tirunelveli Chalukya Express. This runs via Hassan and joins the Bangalore-Hubli main line at Arsikere. It is named after the Sharavati River of Karnataka.

Sharavati Express operates as train number 11035 from Dadar to Mysore and as train number 11036 in the reverse direction.

== Route and halts ==
- Dadar
- Kalyan
- Karjat Junction
- Pune Junction
- Satara
- Sangli
- Miraj Junction
- Belagavi
- Londa Junction
- Hubballi Junction
- Davangere
- Birur Junction
- Arsikere Junction
- Mysore

== Traction ==
Both trains are hauled by a Bhusawal Loco Shed-based WAP-4 electric locomotive from Mysuru to Dadar and vice versa.

== Gallery ==
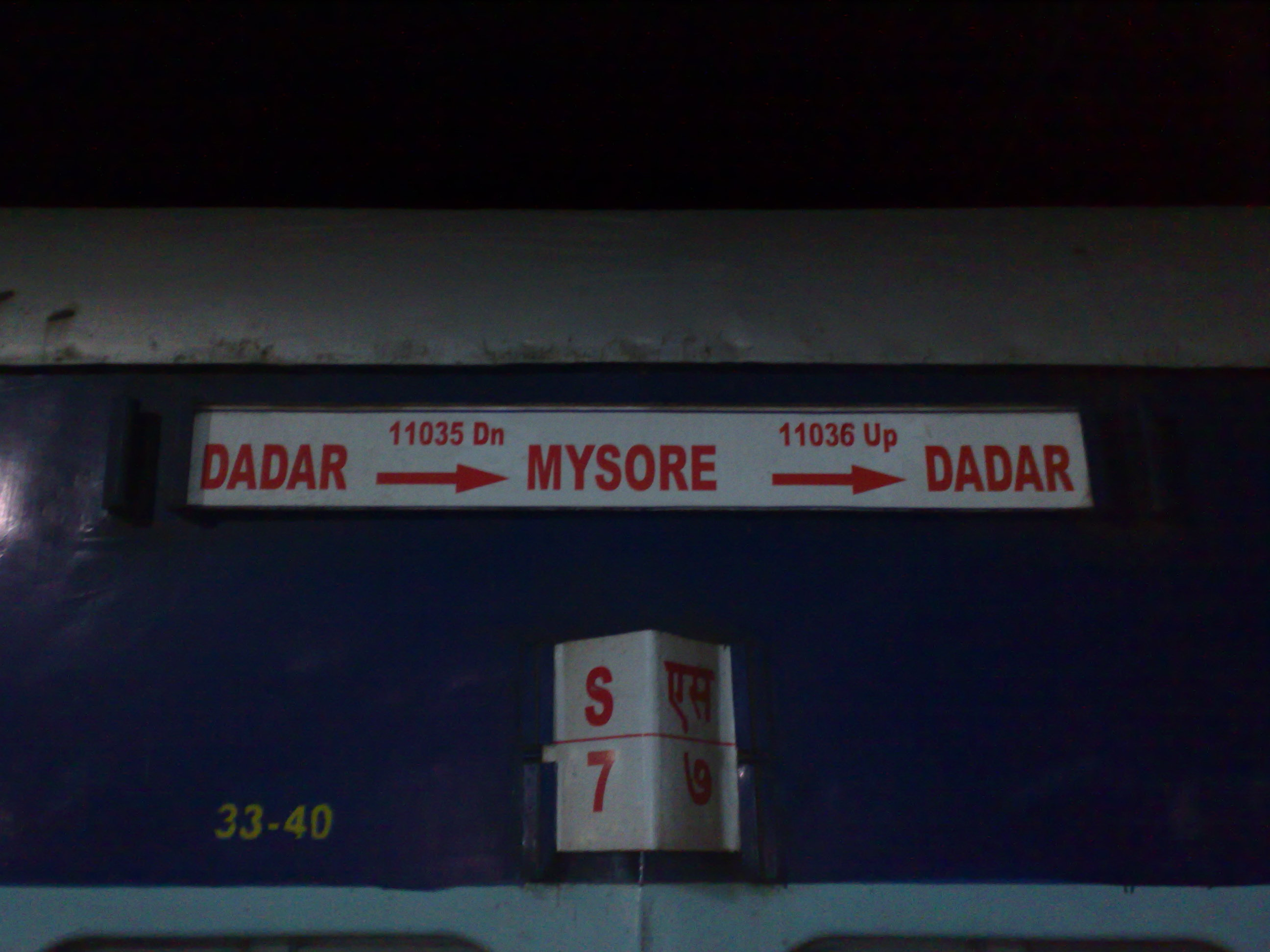

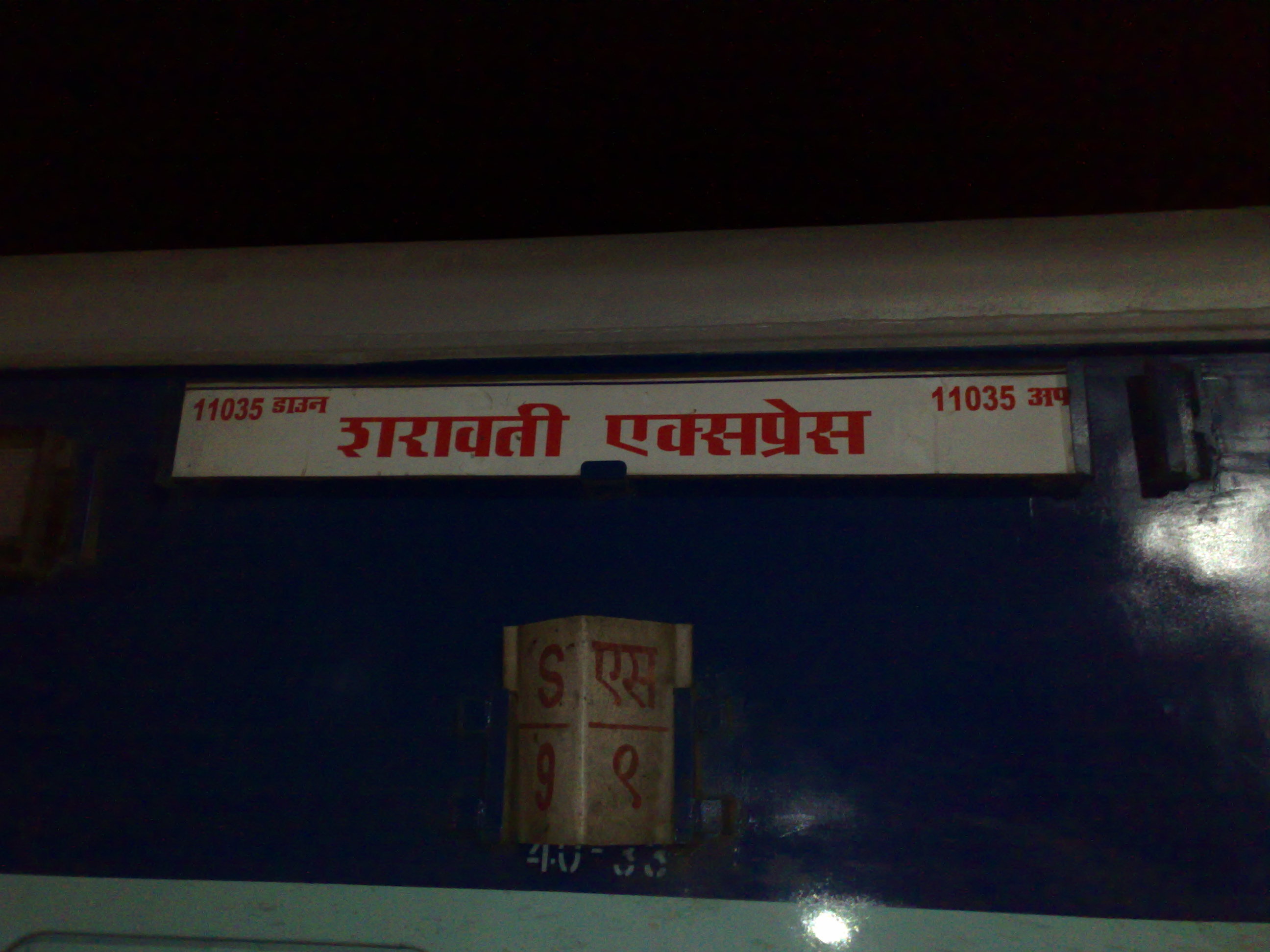

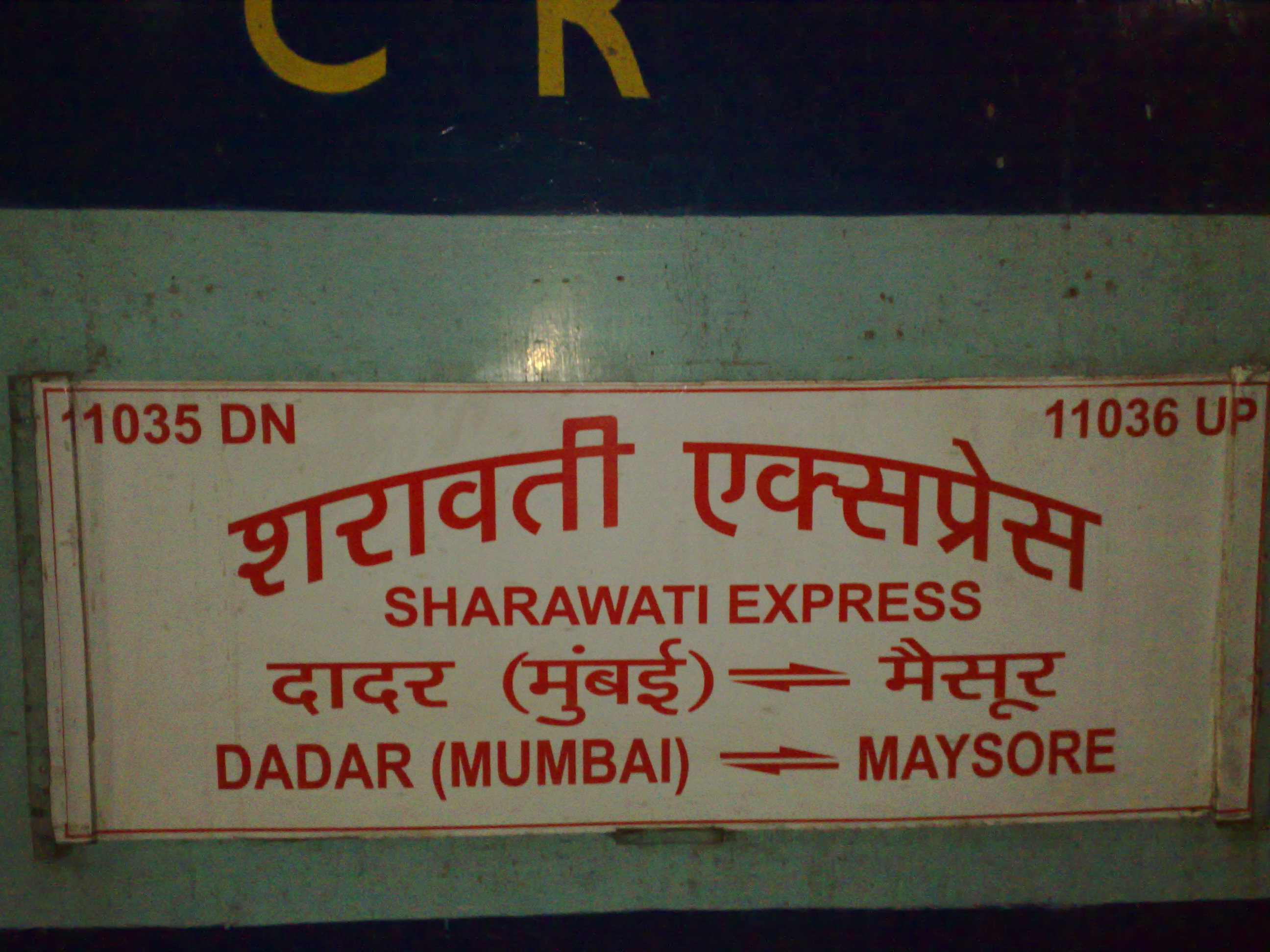
