= Miraj Junction - Castlerock Express =

Miraj - Castlerock Express
Overview
- Service type: Express trains in India
- Current operator: South Western Railway zone

Route
- Termini: Miraj (MRJ); Castlerock (CLR)
- Stops: 21
- Distance travelled: 137 km (85 mi)
- Average journey time: 2h 29m
- Service frequency: Daily (Note: Runs seven days in a week for every direction.)
- Train number: 17333/17334

On-board services
- Class: General Unreserved
- Seating arrangements: Yes
- Sleeping arrangements: No
- Catering facilities: No
- Observation facilities: ICF coach
- Entertainment facilities: No
- Baggage facilities: No
- Other facilities: Below the seats

Technical
- Rolling stock: 2
- Track gauge: 1,676 mm (5 ft 6 in)
- Operating speed: 55 km/h (34 mph), including halts

The Miraj - Castlerock Express is an important train belonging to South western Railway zone that runs between Miraj Junction of Maharashtra and Castlerock Karnataka in India. It is currently being operated with 17333/17334 train numbers on a daily basis.

Castlerock is a beautiful station bordering Karnataka & Goa and falls in the Brigganza Ghatt section.

== Service ==
The 22145/Pandharpur–Miraj Superfast Express has an average speed of 55 km/h and covers 137 km in 2h 29m. The 22146/Miraj–Pandharpur Superfast Express has an average speed of 55 km/h and covers 137 km in 2h 29m.

== Route and halts ==
The important halts of the train are:

- Miraj Junction
- Kudachi
- Raybag
- chikkodi
- Ghataprabha
- Gokak
- Belgaum
- Londa Junction

== Coach composition ==
The train has standard ICF rakes with max speed of 110 kmph. The train consists of 11 coaches:

- 9 General Unreserved
- 2 Seating cum Luggage Rake

== Traction ==
Both trains are hauled by a Pune Loco Shed-based WDM-3A diesel locomotive from Castlerock to Miraj and vice versa.

== Rake share and direction reversal ==
The train shares its rake with 17331/17332 Miraj–Hubballi Express. Loco reversal is done at Londa Junction in up & down direction.

== See also ==
- Pandharpur railway station
- Miraj Junction railway station
- Miraj–Hubballi Express
