= SSS Hubballi–Pune Vande Bharat Express =

Mini Vande Bharat Express train route in India

SSS Hubballi Junction – Pune Junction Vande Bharat Express
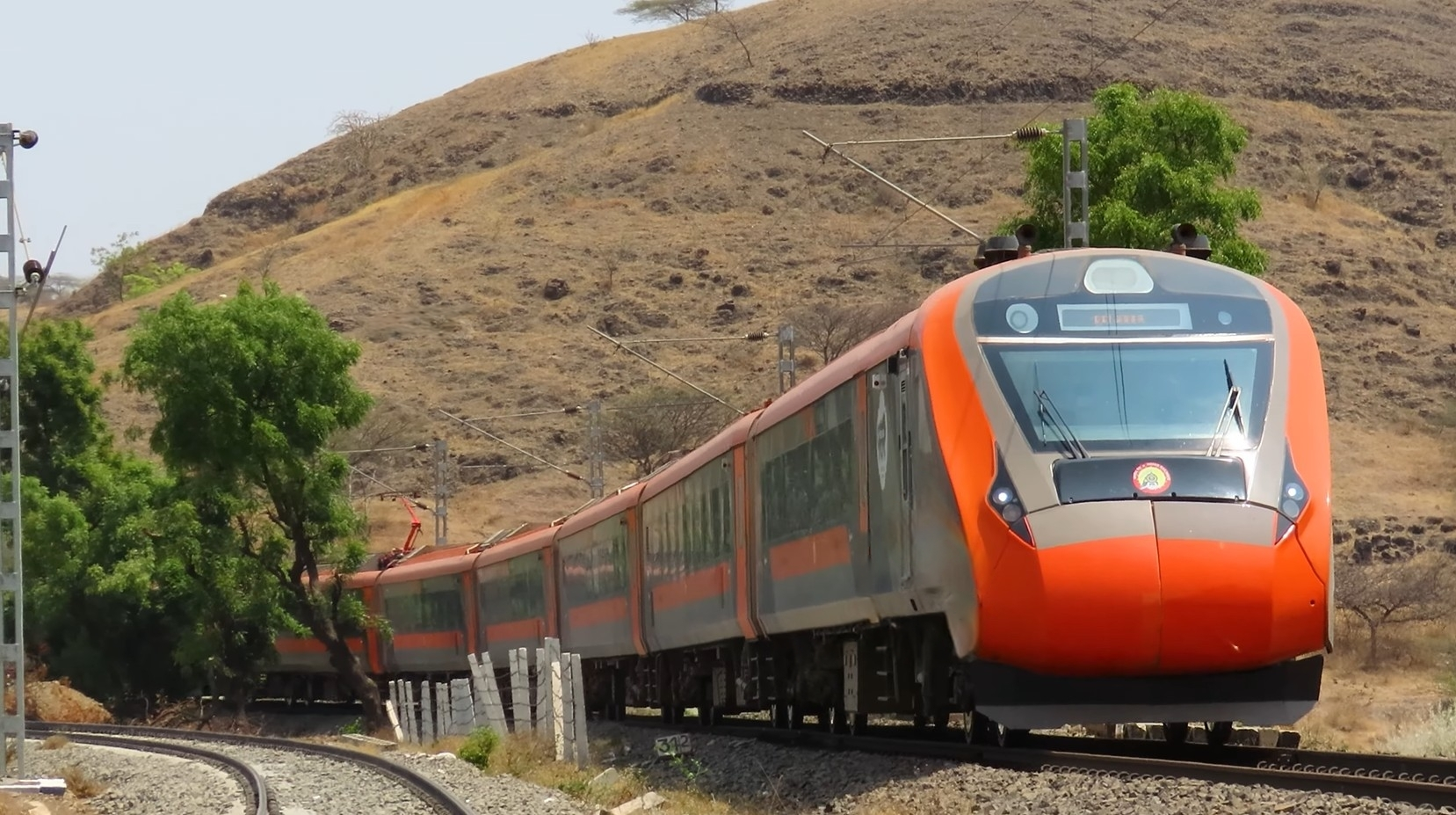
- This Mini Vande Bharat Express heading towards Pune Junction railway station

Overview
- Service type: Vande Bharat Express
- Locale: Karnataka and Maharashtra
- First service: 16 September 2024 (inaugural); 18 September 2024; 2 years ago (commercial)
- Current operator: South Western Railways (SWR)

Route
- Termini: SSS Hubballi Junction (UBL); Pune Junction (PUNE)
- Stops: 07
- Distance travelled: 558 km (347 mi)
- Average journey time: 08 hrs 30 mins
- Service frequency: Three days a week (Note: Except Mondays, Tuesdays, Thursdays & Saturdays)
- Train number: 20669 / 20670
- Lines used: Guntakal–Vasco da Gama line (till Londa Jn); Londa–Miraj–Pune line

On-board services
- Classes: AC Chair Car, AC Executive Chair Car
- Seating arrangements: Airline style; rotatable seats
- Sleeping arrangements: No
- Catering facilities: On-board catering
- Observation facilities: Large windows in all coaches
- Entertainment facilities: On-board WiFi; infotainment system; electric outlets; reading lights; seat pockets; bottle holders; tray tables
- Baggage facilities: Overhead racks
- Other facilities: Kavach

Technical
- Rolling stock: Mini Vande Bharat 2.0
- Track gauge: Indian gauge
- Electrification: 25 kV 50 Hz AC overhead line
- Operating speed: 66 km/h (41 mph) (avg.)
- Average length: 192 metres (630 ft) (8 coaches)
- Track owner: Indian Railways
- Rake maintenance: SSS Hubballi Jn (UBL)
- Rake sharing: 20673/20674 SCSMT Kolhapur ⇔ Pune Vande Bharat Express

The 20669/20670 SSS Hubballi–Pune Vande Bharat Express is India's 62nd Vande Bharat Express train, connecting the city of Hubli in Karnataka with the Deccan Plateau city of Pune in Maharashtra.

This express train was inaugurated on September 16, 2024 (instead of September 15, 2024) by Prime Minister Narendra Modi via video conferencing from the largest metropolitan city of Ahmedabad in the western state of Gujarat.

== Overview ==
This train is currently operated by Indian Railways, connecting SSS Hubballi Jn, Dharwad, Belagavi, Ghataprabha, Miraj Junction, Sangli, Kirloskarvadi, Satara and Pune Junction. It currently operates with train numbers 20669/20670 on a three-day a week basis.

== Rakes ==
It is the fifty-ninth second generation and forty-second Mini Vande Bharat 2.0 Express train which was designed and manufactured by the Integral Coach Factory at Perambur, Chennai under the Make in India initiative.

== Service ==
The 20669/20670 SSS Hubballi–Pune Vande Bharat Express currently operates three days a week, covering a distance of 558 km (347 mi) in a travel time of 08hrs 30mins with an average speed of 66 km/h (41 mph). The maximum permissible speed (MPS) will be confirmed after a commercial run.

== See also ==
- Vande Bharat Express
- Tejas Express
- Gatiman Express
- Hubballi Junction railway station
- Pune Junction railway station
