= Chalukya (disambiguation) =

Several dynasties named "Chalukya" ruled in present-day India at various times. The oldest of these were the Chalukya dynasty, Chalukyas of Vatapi or Badami (c. 6th-8th century CE). Other Chalukya dynasties include:

- Chalukyas of Navasarika (c. 7th-8th century CE), vassals of the Vatapi Chalukyas; also known as the early Chalukyas of Gujarat
- Chalukyas of Vemulavada (c. 7th-10th century CE), vassals of the Rashtrakutas
- Chalukyas of Vengi (c. 7th-12th century CE), also known as the Eastern Chalukyas
- Chalukyas of Saurashtra (c. 8th-10th century) dynasty ruled in Saurashtra region of Gujarat
- Chalukyas of Kalyani (c. 10th-12th century CE), also known as the Western Chalukyas
  - Chalukya–Chola wars
- Chalukyas of Lata (c. 10th-11th century CE); ruled southern Gujarat as vassals of other dynasties, including the Kalyani Chalukyas

== Other uses ==
- Chalukya Shiva Temple, Hindu temple in Karnataka, India; built by the Chalukyas of Vatapi
- Chalukya Express, a defunct passenger train in India superseded by Dadar Central–Tirunelveli Chalukya Express and Dadar–Puducherry Chalukya Express
- Dadar Central–Tirunelveli Chalukya Express, passenger train in India
- Dadar–Puducherry Chalukya Express, passenger train in India
