= Dadar–Puducherry Chalukya Express =

Indian express train

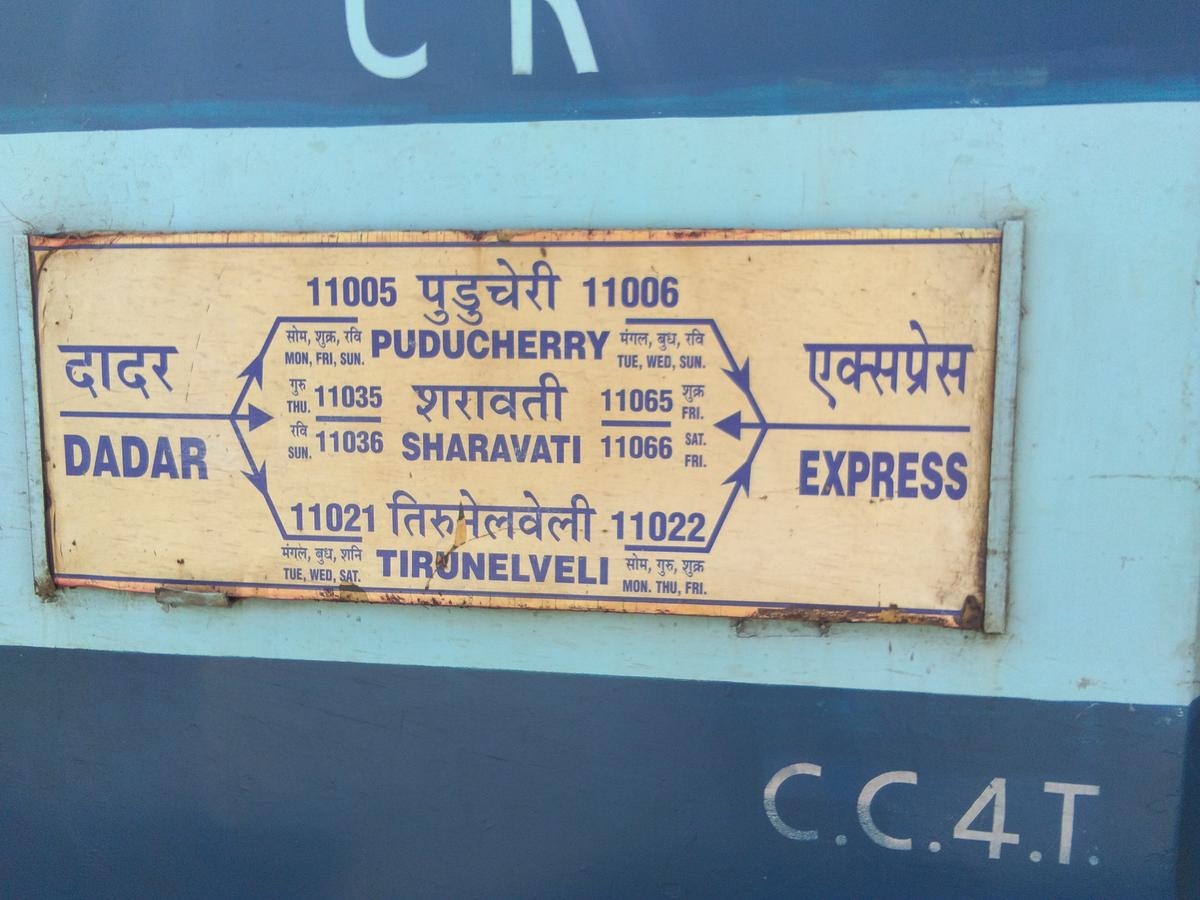
- Chalukya Express train board

Overview
- Service type: Express
- Locale: Maharashtra, Karnataka, Tamilnadu & Puducherry
- First service: 9 November 2012
- Current operator: Central Railways

Route
- Termini: Dadar (DR); Puducherry (PDY)
- Stops: 39
- Distance travelled: 1,639 km (1,018 mi)
- Average journey time: 33 hours 45 minutes
- Service frequency: Tri-weekly (Note: Runs three days in a week for every direction.)
- Train number: 11005 / 11006

On-board services
- Classes: AC 2 tier, AC 3 tier, Sleeper Class, General Unreserved
- Seating arrangements: Yes
- Sleeping arrangements: Yes
- Catering facilities: On-board catering E-catering
- Baggage facilities: Below the seats

Technical
- Rolling stock: ICF coach
- Track gauge: 1,676 mm (5 ft 6 in)
- Operating speed: 49 km/h (30 mph) average including halts
Route map
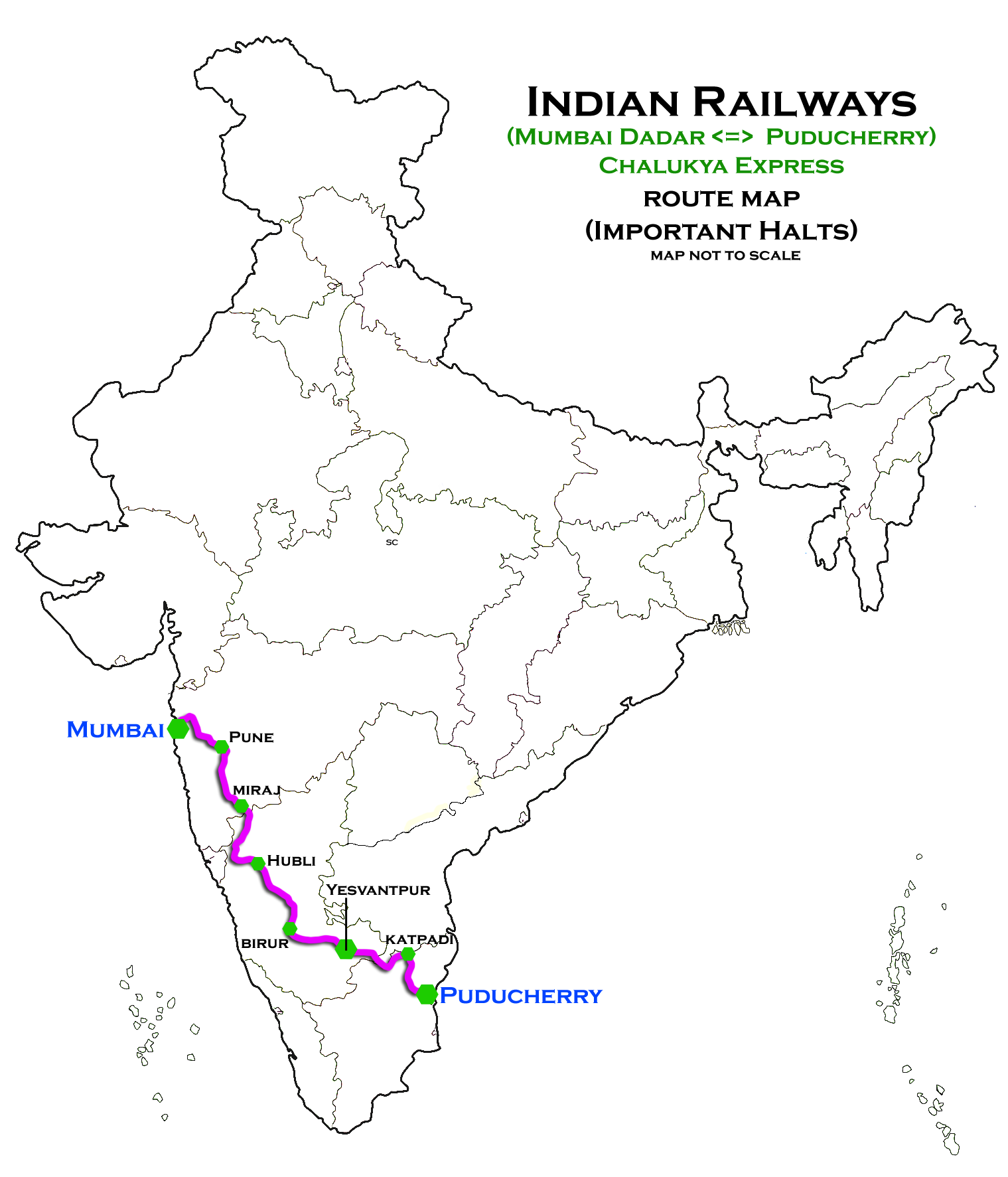

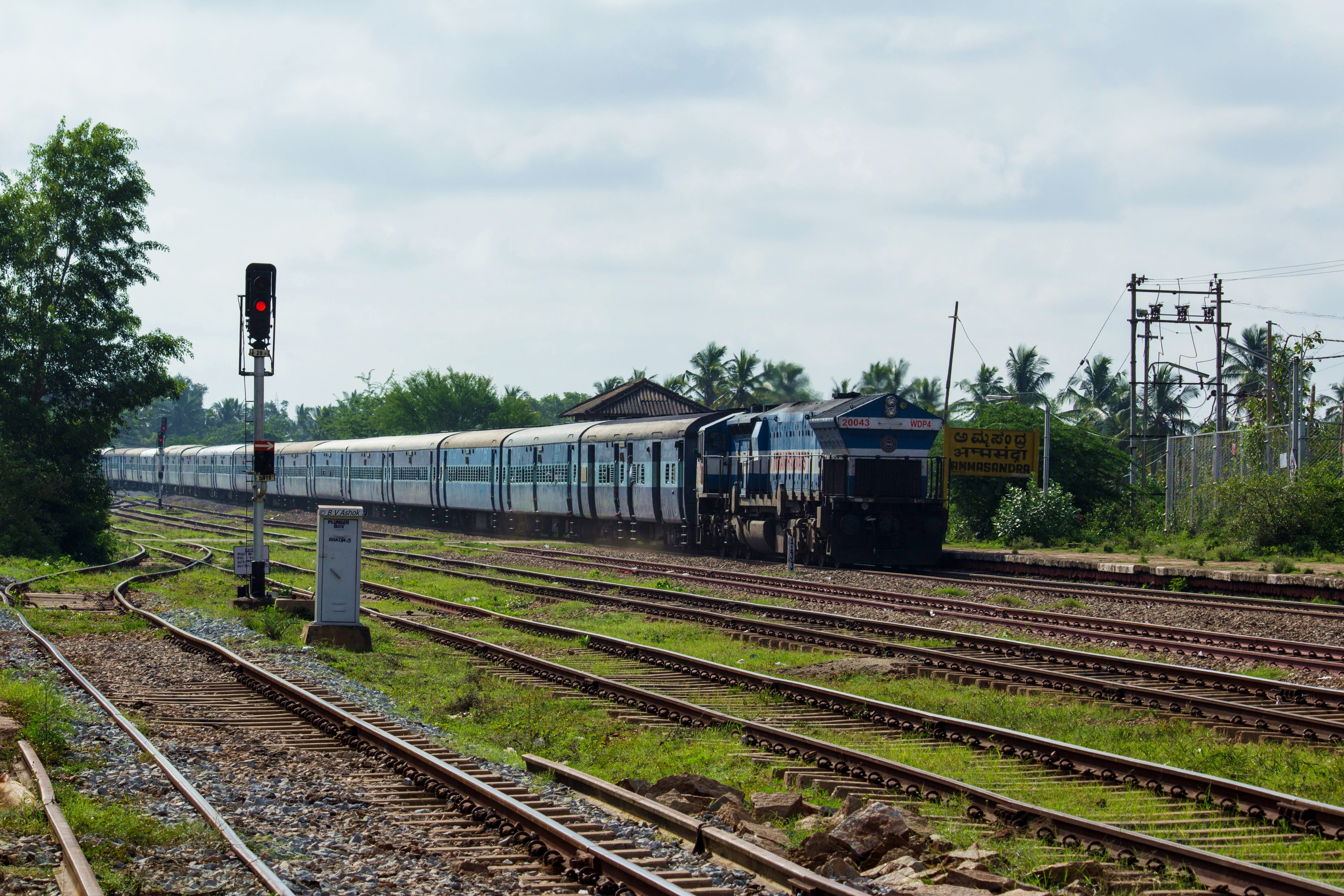
Puducherry Dadar Chalukya Express kicks up dust to pass through Ammasandra

The 11005 / 11006 Dadar–Puducherry Chalukya Express is an express train of the Indian Railways connecting Puducherry in Puducherry and Dadar of Mumbai, Maharashtra. It is currently being operated with 11005 / 11006 train numbers on daily basis.

== History ==
This train gets its name from the Chalukya dynasty that ruled the Karnataka region. Earlier, this train used to runs up to Yesvantpur Junction in Bengaluru with six days with the No. 11017/11018. It Was Extended up to Puducherry and Tirunelveli Junction with tri weekly days to each. Remaining 3 days, it runs as train, Dadar–Tirunelveli Chalukya Express with train no. 11021/11022.

== Route and halts ==
- Dadar
- Kalyan Junction
- Pune Junction
- Satara
- Karad
- Sangli
- Miraj Junction

Maharashtra - Karnataka State Border

- Kudachi
- Belagavi
- Londa Junction
- Hubli
- Davangere
- Arsikere Junction
- Chikkabanavara Junction
- SMVT Bengaluru
- Bangarapet Junction

Karnataka - Tamil Nadu State Border

- Katpadi Junction
- Tiruvannamalai
- Viluppuram Junction

Tamil Nadu State - Puducherry UT Border

- Puducherry

== Traction ==
The train is hauled by a Royapuram-based WAP-7 or Bhusawal based WAP-4 end to end

== Direction reversal ==
The train reverses its direction 1 time:

- Katpadi Junction

== Timing ==
11005 – Leaves Dadar, (Mumbai) at 21:30 Hrs IST on Sunday, Monday, Friday and reaches Puducherry on Tuesday, Wednesday, Sunday at morning 7:15 AM IST.

11006 – Leaves Puducherry every Tuesday, Wednesday, Sunday at 21:30 Hrs and reaches Dadar on Thursday, Friday, Tuesday at 5:45 AM IST.

== Coach composition ==
- 1 AC II Tier
- 3 AC III Tier
- 9 Sleeper Coaches
- 3 General

Loco	1	2	3	4	5	6	7	8	9	10	11	12	13	14	15	16	17
	GRD	GEN	GEN	B2	B1	A1	S9	S8	S7	S6	S5	S4	S3	S2	S1	GEN	GRD

== See also ==
- Dadar–Tirunelveli Chalukya Express
- Lokmanya Tilak Terminus–Ernakulam Duronto Express
- Mumbai–Nagercoil Express
