= CSMT Kolhapur–Hazrat Nizamuddin Superfast Express =

Train in India

Shri Chhatrapati Shahu Maharaj Terminus Kolhapur - Hazrat Nizamuddin Superfast Express
Overview
- Service type: Superfast Express
- Current operator: Central Railway zone

Route
- Termini: Shri Chhatrapati Shahu Maharaj Terminus (KOP); Hazrat Nizamuddin (NZM)
- Stops: 15
- Distance travelled: 1,592 km (989 mi)
- Average journey time: 25h
- Service frequency: Weekly
- Train number: 12147/12148

On-board services
- Classes: 2A, 3A, SL
- Seating arrangements: YES
- Sleeping arrangements: Yes
- Catering facilities: No
- Entertainment facilities: No

Technical
- Rolling stock: 2
- Track gauge: 1,676 mm (5 ft 6 in)
- Operating speed: 64 km/h (40 mph)

Shri Chhatrapati Shahu Maharaj Terminus Kolhapur - Hazrat Nizamuddin Superfast Express is a Superfast express train of the Indian Railways connecting Shri Chhatrapati Shahu Maharaj Terminus in Maharashtra and Hazrat Nizamuddin in Delhi. It is currently being operated with 12147/12148 train numbers on once in week basis.

== Route and halts ==
The important halts of the train are:

- Chhatrapati Shahu Maharaj Terminus
- Miraj Junction
- Sangli
- Satara
- Pune Junction
- Daund Chord Line
- Manmad Junction
- Bhusaval Junction
- Khandwa Junction
- Itarsi Junction
- Bhopal Junction
- Bina Junction
- Jhansi Junction
- Gwalior Junction
- Agra Cantonment
- Raja Ki Mandi
- Mathura Junction
- Hazrat Nizamuddin

== Traction ==
As the route is yet to be fully electrified, it is hauled by a Pune Diesel Loco Shed based WDP4D or WDM3A/3D from Kolhapur up to Pune handing over to a Bhusaval Electric Loco Shed based WAP-4 locomotive for the remainder of the journey until Hazrat Nizamuddin.

== Direction reversal ==
Train Reverses its direction 1 time

- Pune Junction

== Rake maintenance ==
The train is maintained by the Kolhapur Coaching Depot. The same rake is used for Ahmedabad Junction - Shri Chhatrapati Shahu Maharaj Terminus Kolhapur Express for one way which is altered by the second rake on the other way.

== See also ==
- Shri Chhatrapati Shahu Maharaj Terminus railway station
- Hazrat Nizamuddin railway station
- Ahmedabad Junction - Shri Chhatrapati Shahu Maharaj Terminus Kolhapur Express

== Bibliography ==
- 12147/SCSMT Kolhapur - Hazrat Nizamuddin SF Express)
- 12148/Hazrat Nizamuddin - SCSMT Kolhapur SF Express
