= Miraj Junction–Hazrat Nizamuddin Darshan Superfast Express =

Train in India

Miraj Junction – Hazrat Nizamuddin AC Darshan Superfast Express
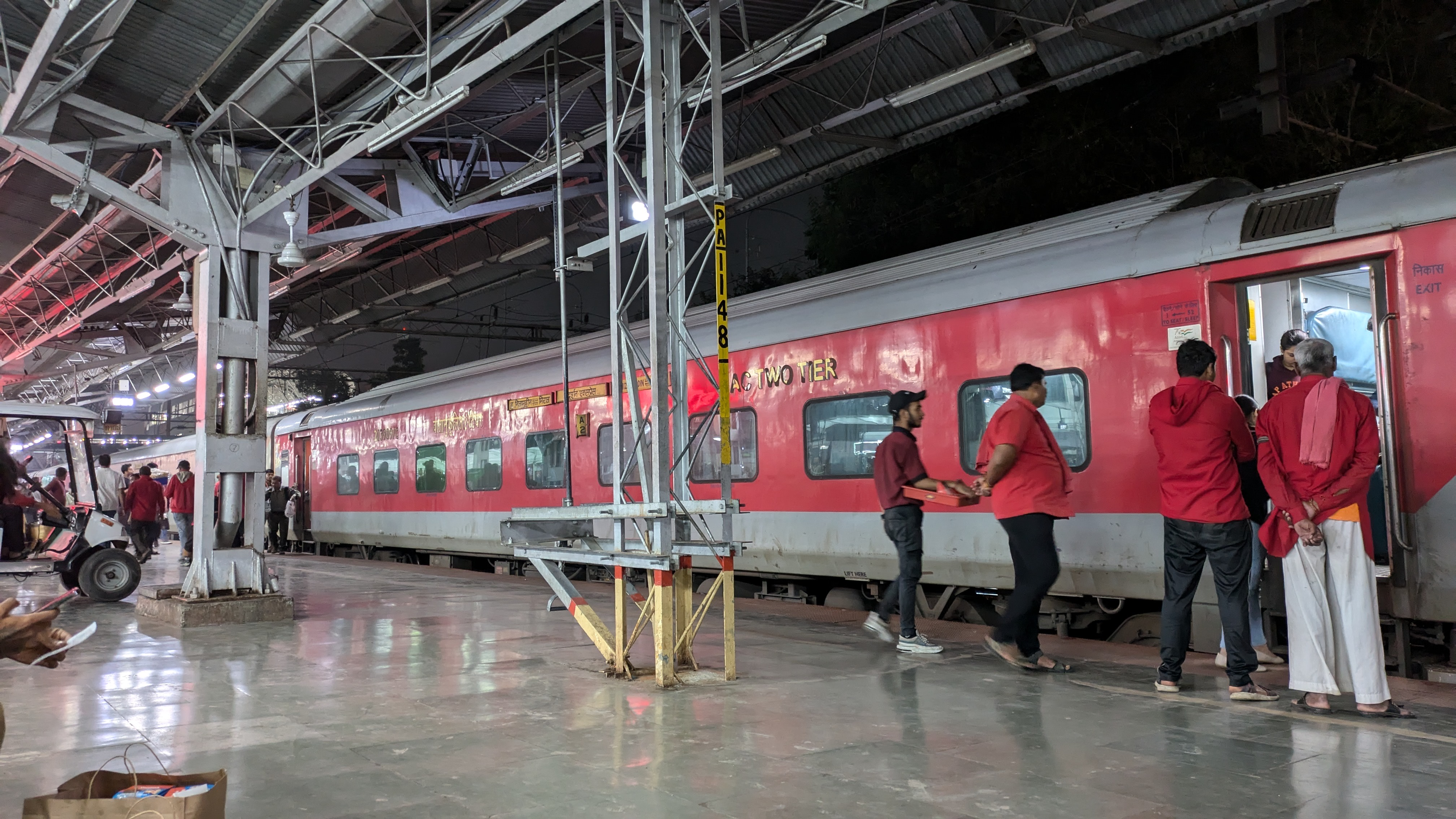
- Miraj-Hazrat Nizamuddin Darshan Superfast Express standing at Pune Junction.

Overview
- Service type: Express
- First service: 24 May 2016; 9 years ago (Inaugural); 4 August 2023; 2 years ago (extended upto Miraj Junction)
- Current operator: Northern Railway

Route
- Termini: Miraj Junction (MRJ); Hazrat Nizamuddin (NZM)
- Stops: 13
- Distance travelled: 1,790 km (1,112 mi)
- Average journey time: 25 hours 55 minutes
- Service frequency: Weekly.
- Train number: 12493 / 12494

On-board services
- Classes: AC First Class, AC 2 Tier, AC 3 Tier, Sleeper Class, General Unreserved
- Seating arrangements: Yes
- Sleeping arrangements: Yes
- Catering facilities: Available
- Observation facilities: Large windows
- Baggage facilities: Available
- Other facilities: Below the seats

Technical
- Rolling stock: LHB coach
- Track gauge: 1,676 mm (5 ft 6 in)
- Electrification: Yes
- Operating speed: 130 km/h (81 mph) maximum, 77 km/h (48 mph) average including halts.

The 12493 / 12494 Miraj–Hazrat Nizamuddin Darshan Superfast Express is a Superfast Express train belonging to Indian Railways – Northern Railway zone that runs between Miraj Junction and Hazrat Nizamuddin in India.

It operates as train number 12493 from Miraj Junction to Hazrat Nizamuddin and as train number 12494 in the reverse direction, serving the states of Maharashtra, Gujarat, Madhya Pradesh, Rajasthan, Uttar Pradesh, Haryana & Delhi.

== Coaches ==
12493/12494 Miraj–Hazrat Nizamuddin Darshan Express has 2 Sleeper, 10 AC 3 tier, 6 AC 2 Tier, 1 AC First Class & 2 End on Generator Coaches. It carries a pantry car.

An additional benefit of Extension to Miraj aided two additional Sleeper class Coaches and 4 general coaches permanently augmented in the trainset to overcome increased occupancy post extension.

As is customary with most train services in India, coach composition may be amended at the discretion of Indian Railways depending on demand.

The train used to run with Rajdhani coaches of ICF. Now the train runs with the new and Modern LHB coach coaches.

| Loco | 1 | 2 | 3 | 4 | 5 | 6 | 7 | 8 | 9 | 10 | 11 | 12 | 13 | 14 | 15 | 16 | 17 | 18 | 19 | 20 | 21 | 22 | 23 | 24 |
|---|---|---|---|---|---|---|---|---|---|---|---|---|---|---|---|---|---|---|---|---|---|---|---|---|
| | EOG | Gen | Gen | S2 | S1 | B9 | B8 | B7 | B6 | B5 | B4 | B3 | B2 | B1 | PC | A5 | A4 | A3 | A2 | A1 | H1 | Gen | Gen | EOG |

- EOG consists of luggage and generator coach
- S consists of sleeper coaches.
- B consists of AC 3 Tier coach
- PC consists of pantry car coach
- A consists of AC 2 Tier coach
- H consists of first-class AC coach
- Gen consists of general coaches

== Service ==
12493 Miraj Junction–Hazrat Nizamuddin Darshan Express covers the distance of 1,790 km (1,112 mi) in 25 hours 55 minutes (77.00 km/h) and in 24 hours 45 mins as 12494 Hazrat Nizamuddin–Miraj Junction Darshan Express (73.00 km/h).

As the average speed of the train is above 55 km/h (34 mph), as per Indian Railways rules, its fare includes a Superfast surcharge. The train has maximum speed of 130 kmph.

- During Miraj - Goa Meter gauge line. Goa Express use to run from Vasco to Miraj on daily basis. And a linking train Miraj - Hazrat Nizamuddin Express well known as 'Super' was operational with Primary Maintenance at Miraj.
- Post Gauge Conversion of Vasco Miraj line, both the trains were cancelled & Goa SF Exp to Hazrat Nizamuddin was introduced with revised timings.
- The train created a joint connectivity between the three stations but there was still a demand to revive Miraj - Hazrat Nizamuddin dedicated train to meet the unwavering demand of passengers from the Station.
- Darshan Express was initially made operational between Pune & Hz Nizamuddin citing single line constrains of Pune Miraj Section.
- Post Doubling & Electrification of Pune Miraj Line. As planned Darshan express was extended to Miraj for its first run on 21st of August 2023.
- Currently the train halts at Jejuri, Satara, Karad & Sangli on its route to Miraj.

The train is primarily maintained at Delhi.

== Routing ==
The 12493/12494 Miraj–Hazrat Nizamuddin DarshanExpress runs from Miraj Junction via Sangli, Satara, Pune Junction, Lonavala, Kalyan Junction, Vasai Road, Vapi, Surat, Vadodara Junction, Ratlam Junction, Kota Junction to Hazrat Nizamuddin.

== Traction ==
As the route is fully electrified, a Vadodara Loco Shed or Ghaziabad Loco Shed-based WAP-5 or WAP-7 electric locomotive powers the train up to its destination.

== Operation ==
- 12493 Miraj–Hazrat Nizamuddin Darshan Express leaves Miraj Junction every Sunday & arriving Hazrat Nizamuddin the next day.
- 12494 Hazrat Nizamuddin–Miraj Darshan Express leaves Hazrat Nizamuddin every Friday & arriving Miraj the next day.
