= DVG =

DVG may refer to:

- De Vrije Gedachte ("The Free Thought"), a Dutch freethinkers association established in 1856 as De Dageraad ("The Dawn")
- D. V. Gundappa, Devanahalli Venkataramanaiah Gundappa, popularly known as DVG, a Kannada writer and philosopher
- Davangere railway station, Railway station code of Davangere, a City in Karnataka, an Indian state
- Miscellaneous left (French: divers gauche), a term referring to left-wing candidates not associated with a major party
