= Dadar–Tirunelveli Chalukya Express =

Train in India

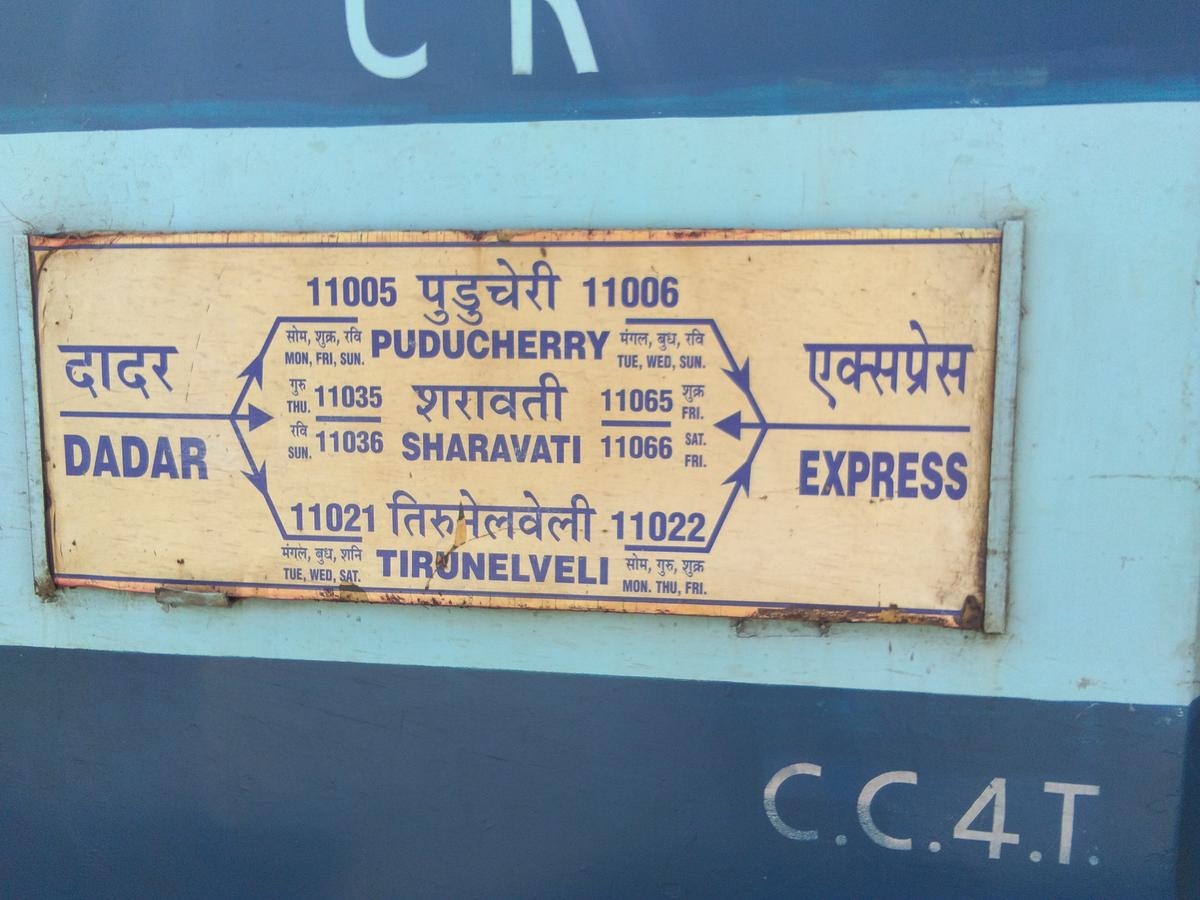
- Chalukya Express train board

Overview
- Service type: Express
- Locale: Maharashtra, Karnataka & Tamilnadu
- First service: 10 November 2012
- Current operator: Central Railways

Route
- Termini: Dadar (DR); Tirunelveli (TEN)
- Stops: 38
- Distance travelled: 1,848 km (1,148 mi)
- Average journey time: 38 hours 15 minutes
- Service frequency: Tri-weekly (Note: Runs three days in a week for every direction.)
- Train number: 11021 / 11022

On-board services
- Classes: AC 2 tier, AC 3 tier, Sleeper Class, General Unreserved
- Seating arrangements: Yes
- Sleeping arrangements: Yes
- Catering facilities: On-board catering E-catering
- Baggage facilities: Below the seats

Technical
- Rolling stock: ICF coach
- Track gauge: 1,676 mm (5 ft 6 in)
- Operating speed: 47 km/h (29 mph) average including halts
Route map
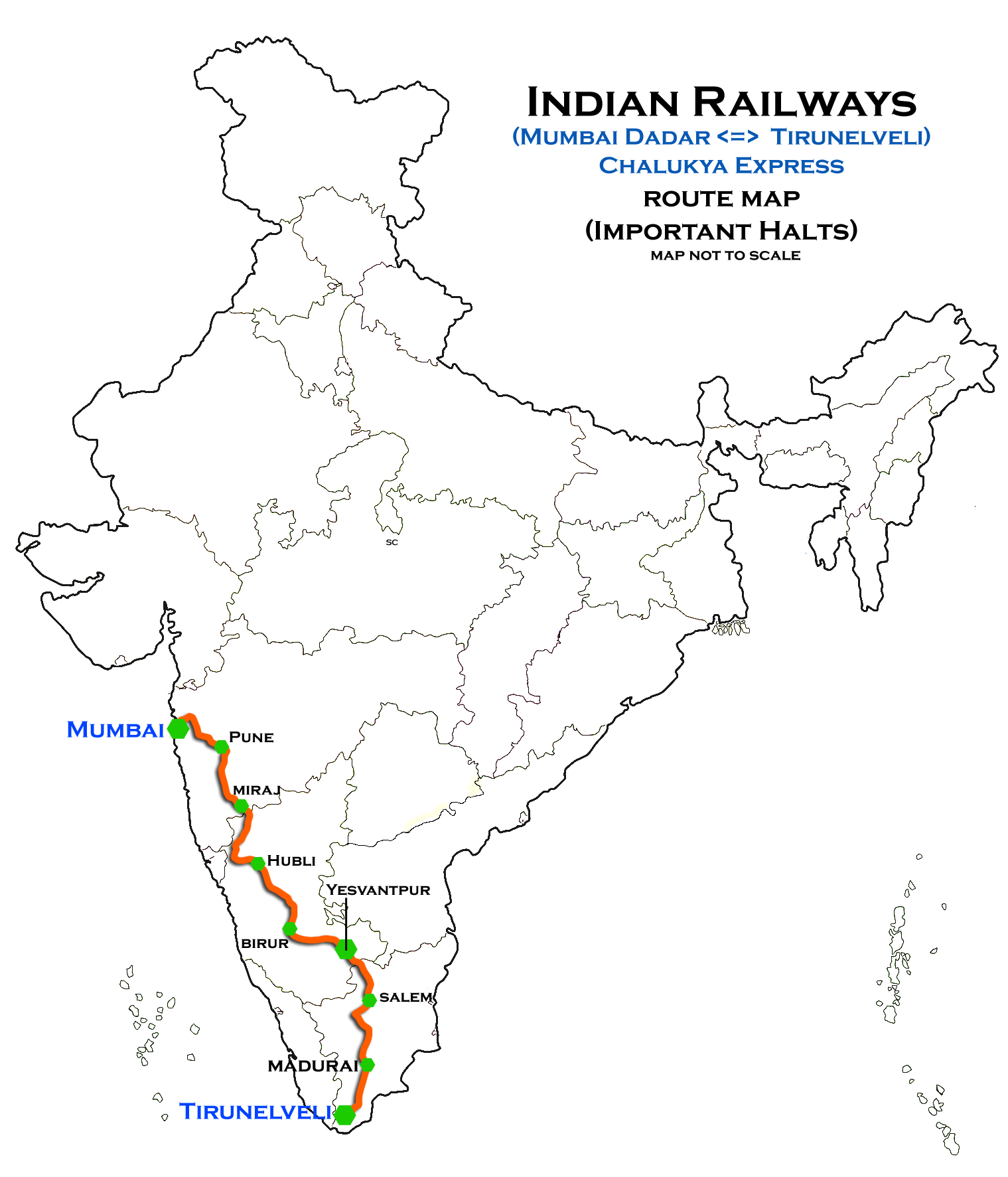

The 11021 / 11022 Dadar–Tirunelveli Chalukya Express is an express train of the Indian Railways connecting Tirunelveli Junction in Tamil Nadu and Dadar of Mumbai, Maharashtra. It is currently being operated as 11021/11022 train numbers on tri-weekly basis.

== History ==
This train gets its name from the Chalukya dynasty that ruled the Karnataka region. This train runs via the Karnataka region, following a Yeswanthpur–Hubli–Belgaum–Miraj route, giving a panoramic view of rural Karnataka.

It operates 6 days per week in each direction – 3 days to Puducherry and 3 days to Tirunelveli Junction. The train covers the distance in 30 hrs 5 minutes. This route is longer and comprises certain ghats.

Earlier, this train runs up to Yesvantpur Junction in Bengaluru with six days with the No. 11017/11018. After 15 Oct 2012, it was extended up to Puducherry and Tirunelveli with tri-weekly days.

== Route and halts ==
- Dadar
- Kalyan Junction
- Pune Junction
- Satara
- Karad
- Sangli
- Miraj Junction

Maharashtra – Karnataka State Border

- Kudachi
- Ghataprabha
- Belagavi
- Londa Junction
- Alnavar Junction
- Dharwad
- SSS Hubballi Junction
- SMM Haveri
- Ranibennur
- Chikjajur Junction
- Harihar
- Davangere
- Birur Junction
- Kadur Junction
- Arsikere Junction
- Tiptur
- Tumakuru
- Chikka Banavara Junction
- SMVT Bengaluru

Karnataka – Tamil Nadu State Border

- Hosur
- Dharmapuri
- Salem Junction
- Namakkal
- Karur Junction
- Dindigul Junction
- Madurai Junction
- Virudhunagar Junction
- Satur
- Kovilpatti
- Tirunelveli Junction

== Gallery ==
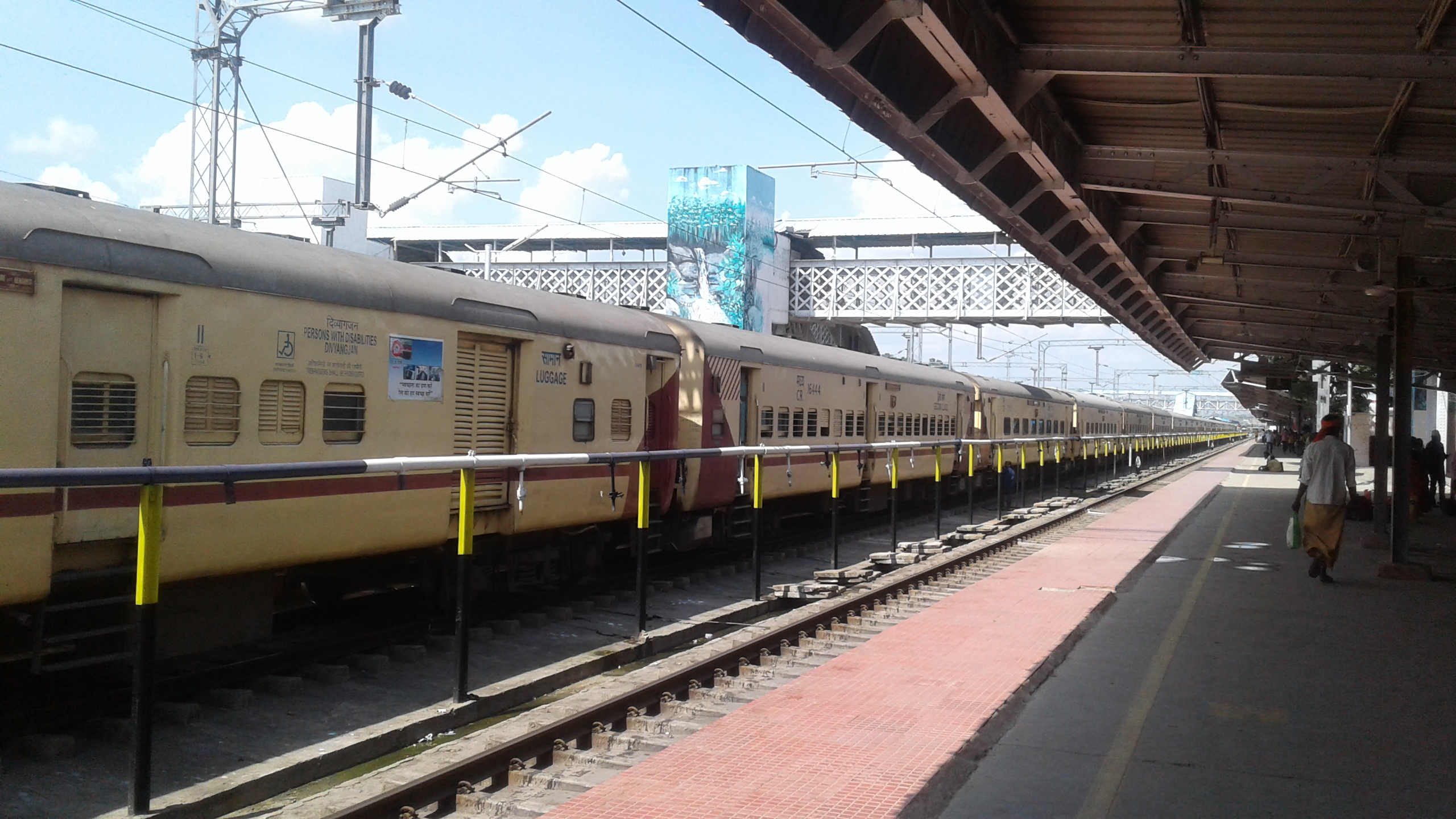

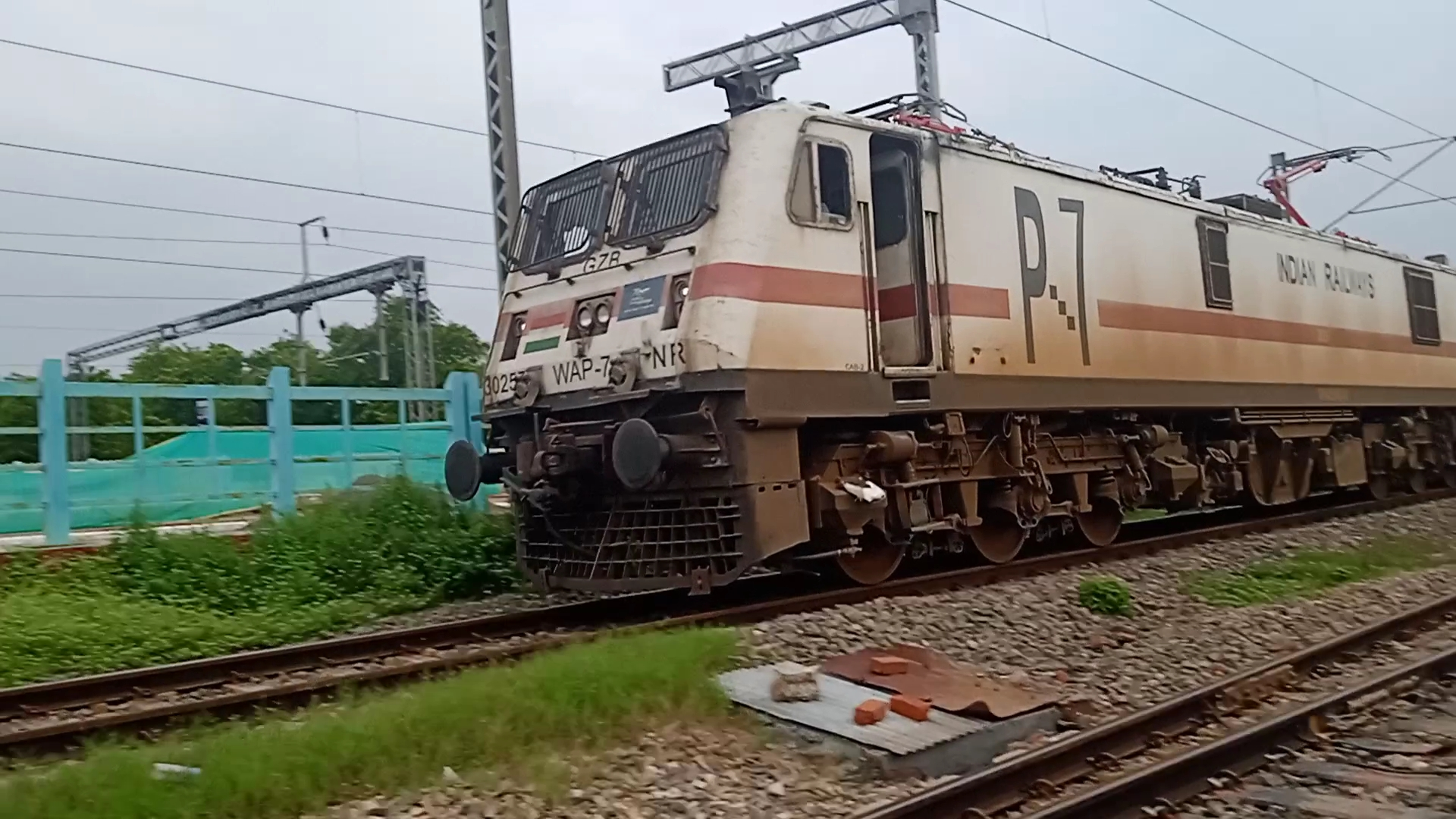

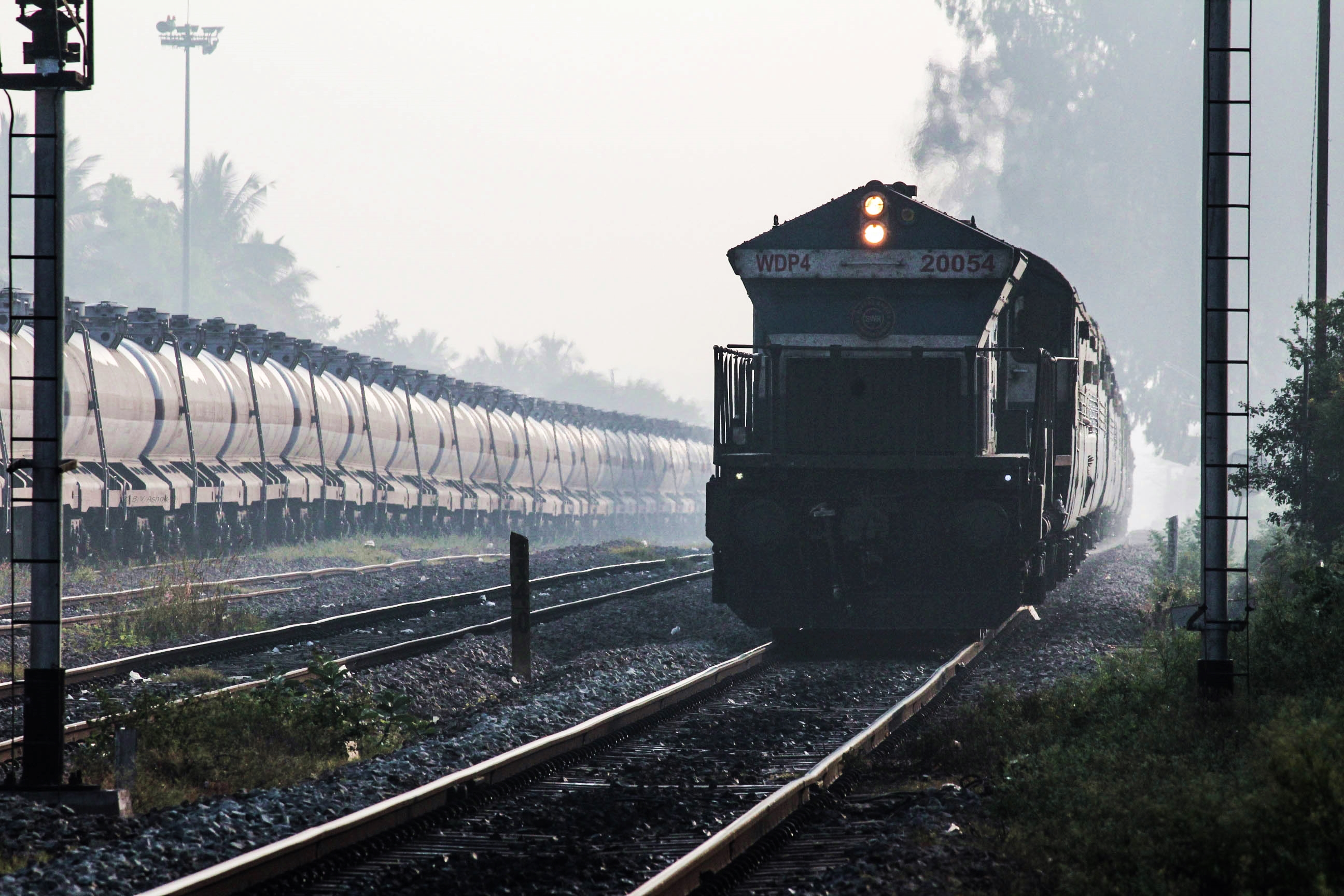

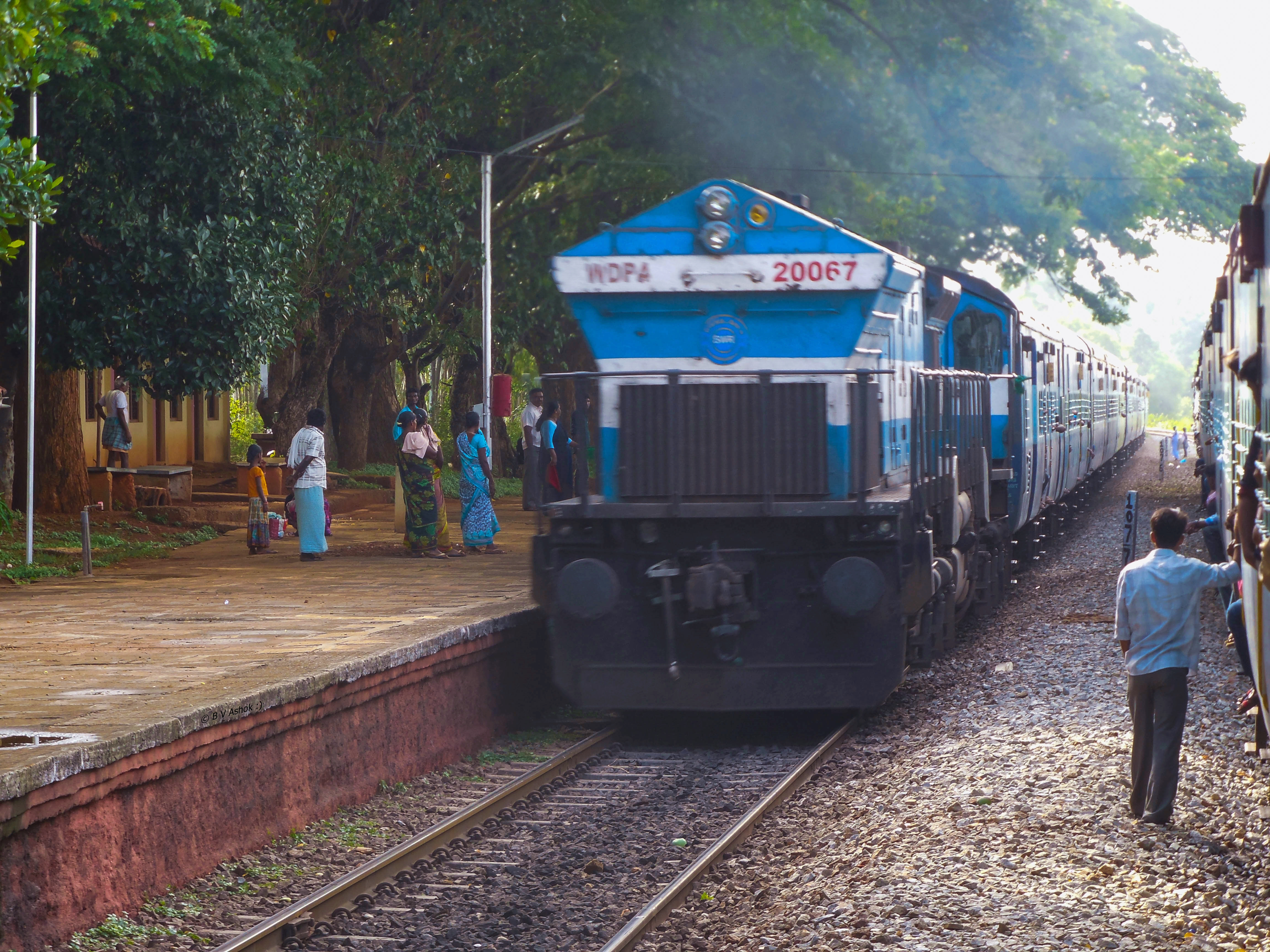

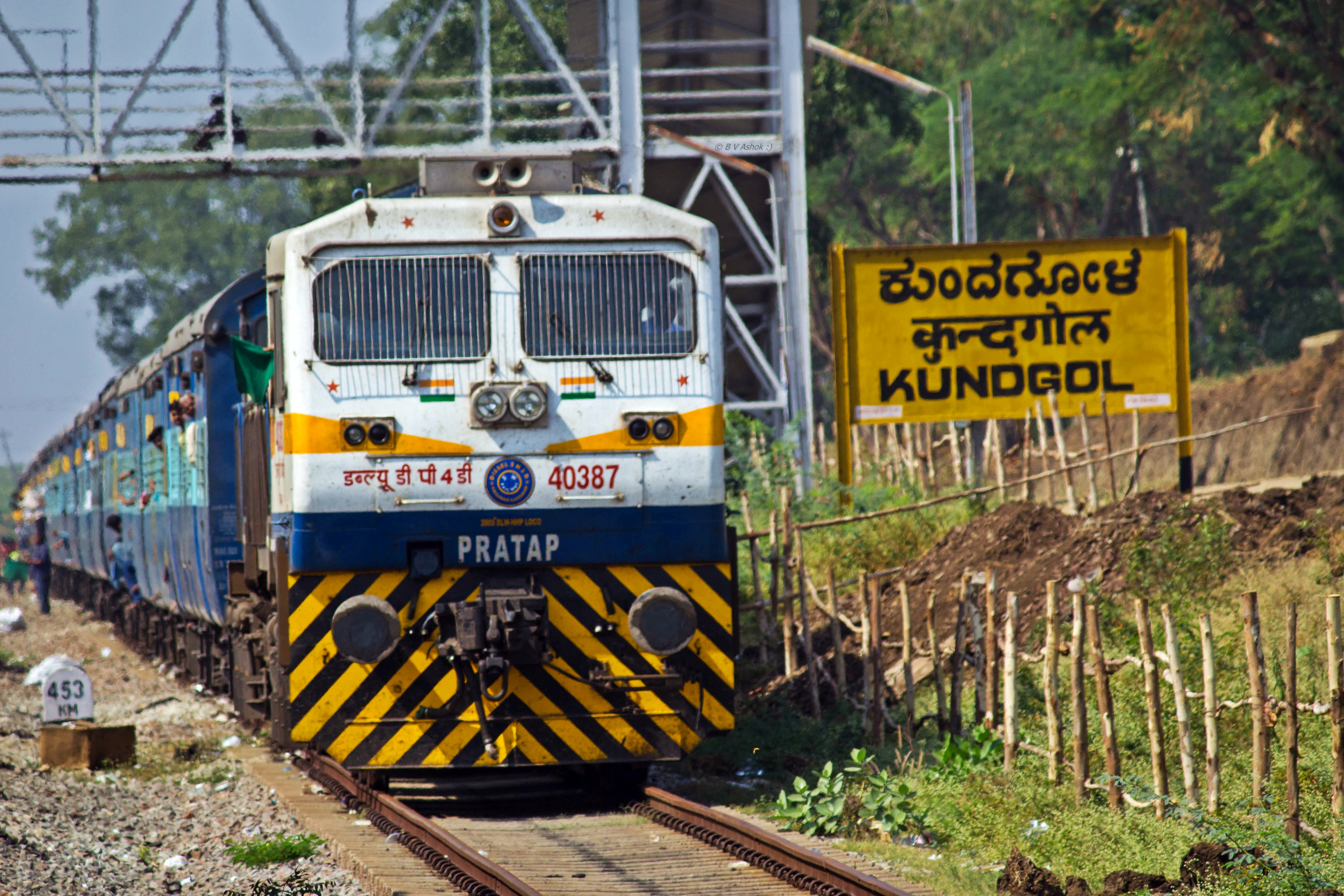

== See also ==
- Dadar–Puducherry Chalukya Express
- Lokmanya Tilak Terminus–Ernakulam Duronto Express
- Mumbai–Nagercoil Express
