= Chaluka =

Chaluka may refer to:

- Chaluka Site, a prehistoric archaeological site in Alaska
- An alternative spelling of halukka, a process of collection and distribution of charity funds for early Zionism
- An older name of Chalukya (disambiguation), multiple Indian rulers

== See also ==
- Chala
