= SCSMT Kolhapur–Pune Vande Bharat Express =

Mini Vande Bharat Express train route in India

SCSMT Kolhapur – Pune Junction Vande Bharat Express
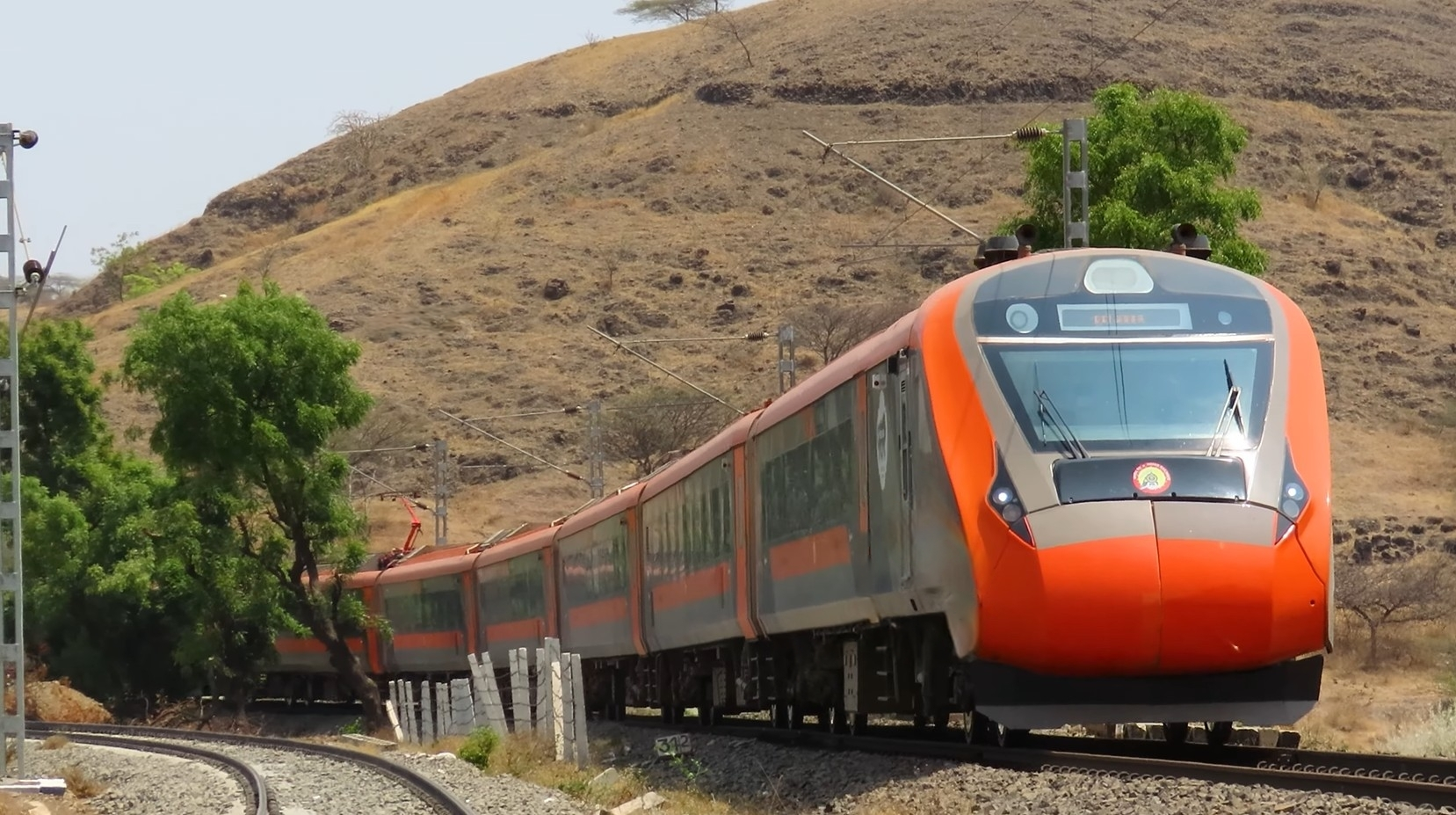
- This Mini Vande Bharat Express heading towards Pune Junction railway station

Overview
- Service type: Vande Bharat Express
- Locale: Maharashtra
- First service: 16 September 2024 (Inaugural); 19 September 2024; 2 years ago (Commercial)
- Current operator: South Western Railways (SWR)

Route
- Termini: SCSMT Kolhapur (KOP); Pune Junction (PUNE)
- Stops: 05
- Distance travelled: 326 km (203 mi)
- Average journey time: 05 hrs 15 mins
- Service frequency: Three days a week (Note: Mondays, Thursdays & Saturdays)
- Train number: 20673 / 20674
- Lines used: Kolhapur–Miraj line; Londa–Miraj–Pune line

On-board services
- Classes: AC Chair Car, AC Executive Chair Car
- Seating arrangements: Airline style; Rotatable seats
- Sleeping arrangements: No
- Catering facilities: On board Catering
- Observation facilities: Large windows in all coaches
- Entertainment facilities: On-board WiFi; Infotainment System; Electric outlets; Reading light; Seat Pockets; Bottle Holder; Tray Table
- Baggage facilities: Overhead racks
- Other facilities: Kavach

Technical
- Rolling stock: Mini Vande Bharat 2.0
- Track gauge: Indian gauge 1,676 mm (5 ft 6 in) broad gauge
- Electrification: 25 kV 50 Hz AC Overhead line
- Operating speed: 62 km/h (39 mph) (Avg.)
- Average length: 192 metres (630 ft) (08 coaches)
- Track owner: Indian Railways
- Rake maintenance: SSS Hubballi Jn (UBL)
- Rake sharing: 20669/20670 SSS Hubballi ⇔ Pune Vande Bharat Express

The 20673/20674 SCSMT Kolhapur - Pune Vande Bharat Express is India's 63rd Vande Bharat Express train, connecting the bank city of Kolhapur with the Deccan Plateau city of Pune in Maharashtra.

This express train was inaugurated on September 16, 2024 by Prime Minister Narendra Modi via video conferencing from Ahmedabad, Gujarat.

== Overview ==
This train is currently operated by Indian Railways, connecting SCSMT Kolhapur, Miraj Jn, Sangli, Kirloskarvadi, Karad, Satara and Pune Jn. It currently operates with train numbers 20673/20674 on 3 days a week basis.

== Rakes ==
It is the same fifty-ninth 2nd Generation and forty-second Mini Vande Bharat 2.0 Express train which was designed and manufactured by the Integral Coach Factory at Perambur, Chennai under the Make in India Initiative.

== Service ==
The 20673/20674 SCSMT Kolhapur - Pune Vande Bharat Express currently operates 3 days a week, covering a distance of 326 km (203 mi) in a travel time of 05 hrs 15 mins with average speed of 62 km/h (39 mph). The Maximum Permissible Speed (MPS) will be confirmed after commercial run.

== See also ==
- Vande Bharat Express
- Tejas Express
- Gatiman Express
- Chhatrapati Shahu Maharaj Terminus
- Pune Junction railway station
