= Rani Chennamma Express =

Train in India

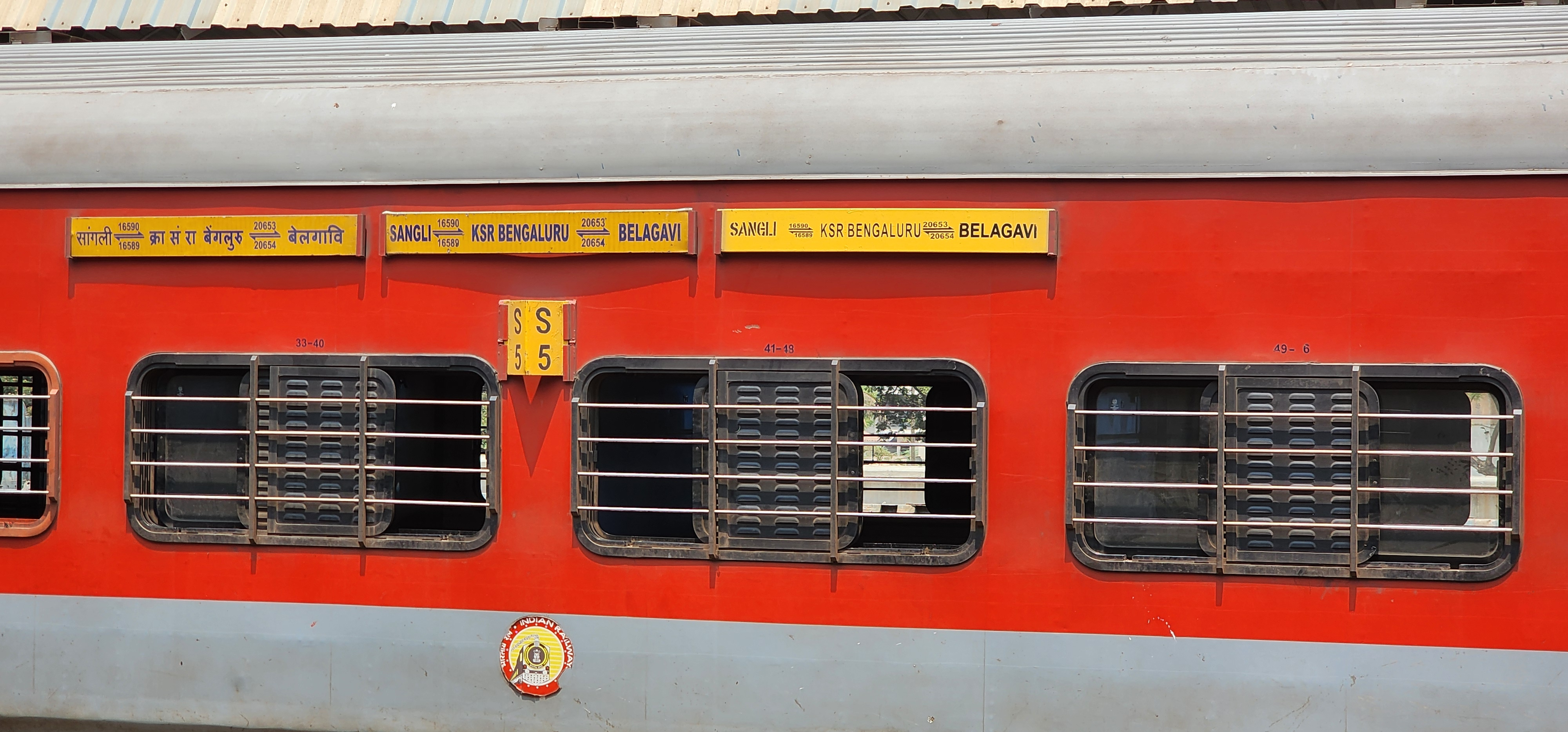
- Sleeper coach of Rani Chennamma Express.

Overview
- Service type: India
- First service: 1 April 1966; 60 years ago
- Current operator: South Western Railway

Route
- Termini: KSR Bengaluru (SBC); Sangli (SLI)
- Stops: 25
- Distance travelled: 756 km (470 mi)
- Average journey time: 15 hrs 15 mins
- Service frequency: Daily
- Train number: 16589 / 16590

On-board services
- Classes: AC First Class, AC 2 Tier, AC 3 Tier, Sleeper Class, General Unreserved
- Seating arrangements: Yes
- Sleeping arrangements: Yes
- Catering facilities: On-board catering, E-catering
- Observation facilities: Large windows
- Baggage facilities: No
- Other facilities: Below the seats

Technical
- Rolling stock: LHB coach
- Track gauge: Broad Gauge
- Operating speed: 51 km/h (32 mph) average including halts.
Route map
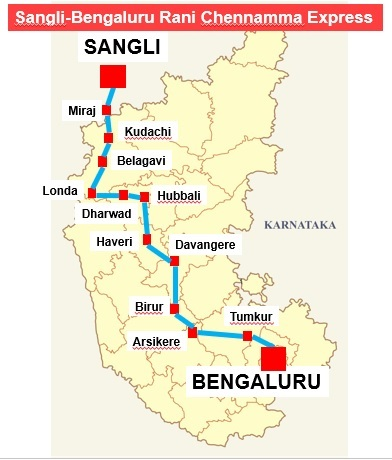

The 16589 / 16590 Rani Chennamma Express is a most prestigious and popular train connecting Bengaluru, Capital of Karnataka,IT hub and Sangli, the Turmeric city and agriculture and industrial hub in southern Maharashtra, India.

Rani Chennamma Express is a daily train maintained by South Western Railway, Bangalore division which covers a distance of 756 kilometres (470 miles) between Bengaluru(SBC) and Sangli(SLI). Before 13 March 2024,This train ran between Bengaluru and Miraj since meter gauge era as Kittur Express. The train is well known as the Queen of the South Western Railways . Rani Chennamma Express Was started long time ago in 1964 as Miraj - Bangalore Meter Gauge Express.After gauge conversion in 1996,This train restarted its service between Miraj and Bangalore as Rani Chennamma Express.In 2002 railway budget, this train was Extended up to Kolhapur.but after Corona pandemic, Railway board implemented Zero base time table and decided to short termination of Rani Chennamma Express at Miraj

== Route ==
Train 16590 Sangli-Bengaluru Rani Chennamma express train leaves Sangli at 15:00 pm, and reaches Bengaluru at 06:15 am the following day. Enroute the Rani Chennamma Express travels overnight to Hubballi-Dharwad, Gokak, and Belagavi from KSR Bengaluru, the capital city of Karnataka. Rani Chennamma Express is the fastest overnight train between Bangalore & Hubballi-Dharwad.

Train 16589 Bengaluru-Sangli Rani Chennamma express train leaves Bengaluru city station at 23 hours at night and reaches Sangli at 12:50 pm the next day. It reaches Hubballi by 6:00 am and Belagavi by 8:50 in morning.

It is the best train for people travelling from Sangli to Belagavi, Dharwad, Hubli, Bengaluru.

In addition to connecting the major cities of Maharashtra and Karnataka with Sangli, Miraj, Hubballi, Dharwad, Belagavi, Ranebennur, Haveri, Davangere, Kadur, Tiptur, and Tumkuru with Bengaluru.

The train serves the smaller towns of Alnavar, Khanapur, Gokak, Ghatprabha, Chinchli, Kudchi,Ugar Khurd and Raybag to Medical City, Miraj Jn.

Rani Chennamma Express is South India's second-busiest train, after the Tambaram–Mangaluru Central Express.

== Traction ==
As the entire route is fully electrified it is hauled by a Krishnarajapuram-based WAP-7 on its entire journey.

== Name and origin ==
The train is named after Rani (Queen) Chennamma who ruled Northern Karnataka during the early 19th century and is known for her freedom struggle to free her province from British rule.

Rani Chennamma's capital was at Kittur in Belagavi district.

Rani Chennamma express Express starts its journey from Sangli railway station which is globally famous as Turmeric City as it is one of the largest Turmeric Powder Trade Center. Sangli has several large Sugar factories and is referred as Sugar Belt. Sangli is also one of the largest market for grapes, raisins and jaggery in Western India. Due to this reason, people from major parts of Karnataka and Maharashtra visit Sangli.
