= Miraj–Hubballi Express =

Miraj - Hubballi Intercity Express
Overview
- Service type: Express
- Current operator(s): South Western Railway zone

Route
- Termini: Miraj Junction (MRJ); Hubli Junction (UBL)
- Stops: 10
- Distance travelled: 279 km (173 mi)
- Average journey time: 6 hours 45 minutes
- Service frequency: Daily

On-board services
- Class(es): Second Class sitting, Unreserved
- Seating arrangements: Yes
- Sleeping arrangements: No
- Catering facilities: No
- Entertainment facilities: No
- Baggage facilities: Yes

Technical
- Rolling stock: 2
- Track gauge: 1,676 mm (5 ft 6 in)
- Operating speed: 45 km/h (28 mph)

Miraj - Hubballi Intercity Express is an intercity train of the Indian Railways connecting Miraj Junction in Maharashtra and Hubballi Junction of Karnataka. It is operated with 17331/17332 train numbers on a daily basis.
