= Miraj Junction railway station =

Indian railway station

Miraj Junction
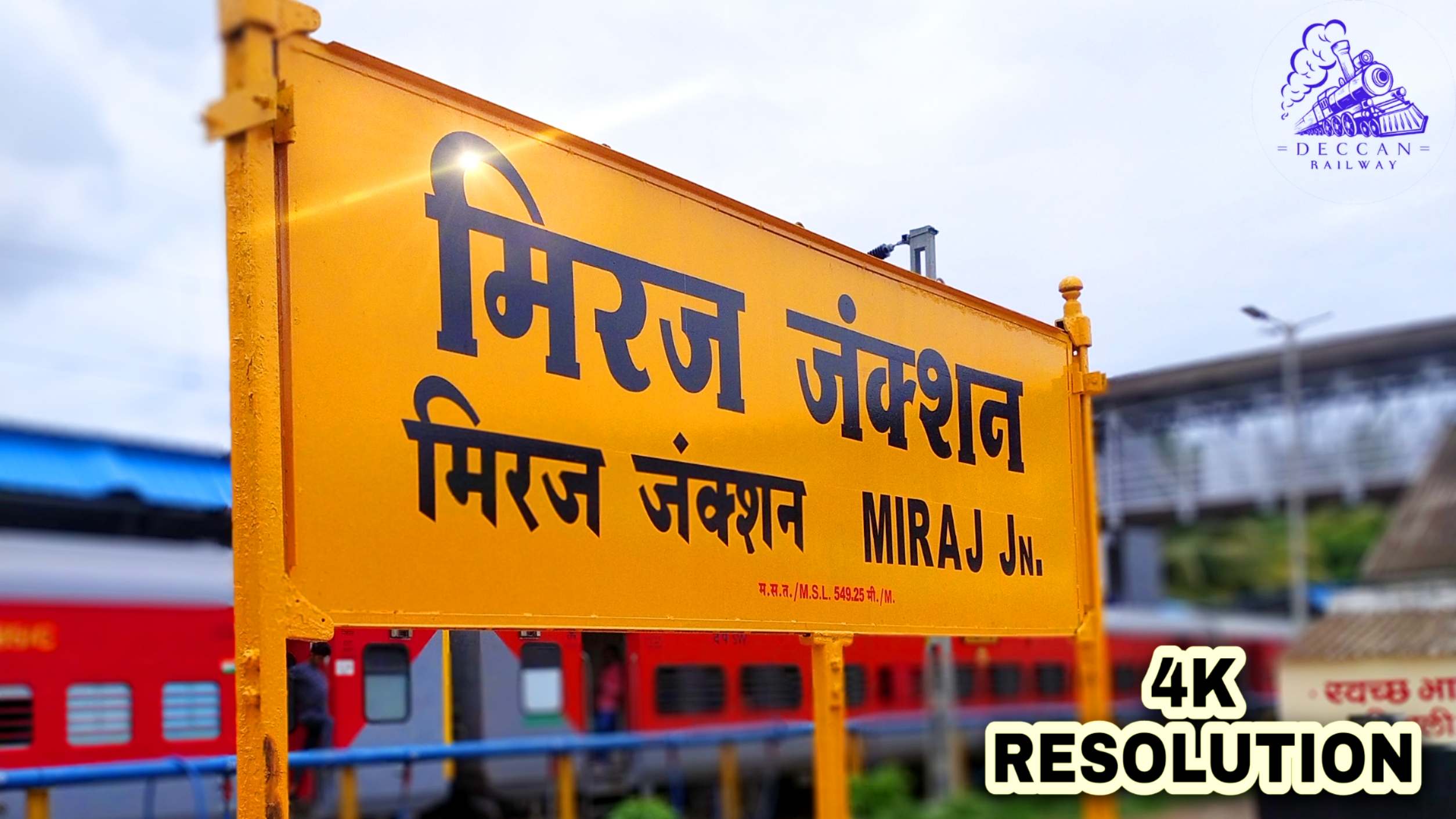
- Miraj Junction Railway station

General information
- Location: Miraj, Maharashtra; India
- Coordinates: 16°49′11″N 74°38′20″E
- Elevation: 554 metres (1,818 ft)
- System: Indian Railways
- Owner: Indian Railways
- Operator: Central Railway
- Transit authority: Indian Railways
- Lines: Pune–Miraj–Londa line Miraj–Kolhapur; Miraj-Latur section
- Platforms: 6
- Tracks: 14
- Bus routes: Miraj, Solapur, Haydrabad, Gulbarga, Raichur, Bellari, Hodspete, Bengluru, Belguam, Hubali, Dharwad, Mysuru, Mandya, Karwar, Madgaon, Panaji, Pandharpur, Kolhapur, Ratnagiri, Chiplun, Mahad, Pune, Nashik, Aurangabad, Latur, Bidar, Bijapur, Badami, Bagalkot, Hasan, Shimoga, Sagar, Bhatkal, Dawangere etc.
- Bus stands: Miraj bus station

Construction
- Structure type: Standard at ground
- Parking: Available (Paid)
- Accessible: Disabled access

Other information
- Status: Functional
- Station code: MRJ
- Zone(s): Central Railway
- Division(s): Pune
- Fare zone: Central Railway

History
- Opened: 1886; 140 years ago

Services
Food stall on Platform 1,3,4, Elevator Constructed on Platform no,1&3, Veg, Non veg food refreshment on platform no.1, Book stall, Amul parlour
Location
- Location within India Location within Maharashtra

Miraj Junction railway station (station code:- MRJ) is an important railway station in the city of Miraj, Maharashtra. The Pune – Yeshwantpur railway line passes through Miraj where it meets the Miraj – Kolhapur branch line. The Miraj - Nagpur section starts at Miraj and passes through towns such as Pandharpur, Kurduvadi, Barshi, Latur, Parli Vaijnath and Dharashiv. It is also a major Junction on Mumbai - Miraj - Bangalore line and Miraj - Nagpur line (via Kurduvadi, Dharashiv, Purna and Nanded.

The number of platforms is 6. The number of trains that halt there is 58. The number of trains that originate there is 9.

The number of trains which terminate there is 9.

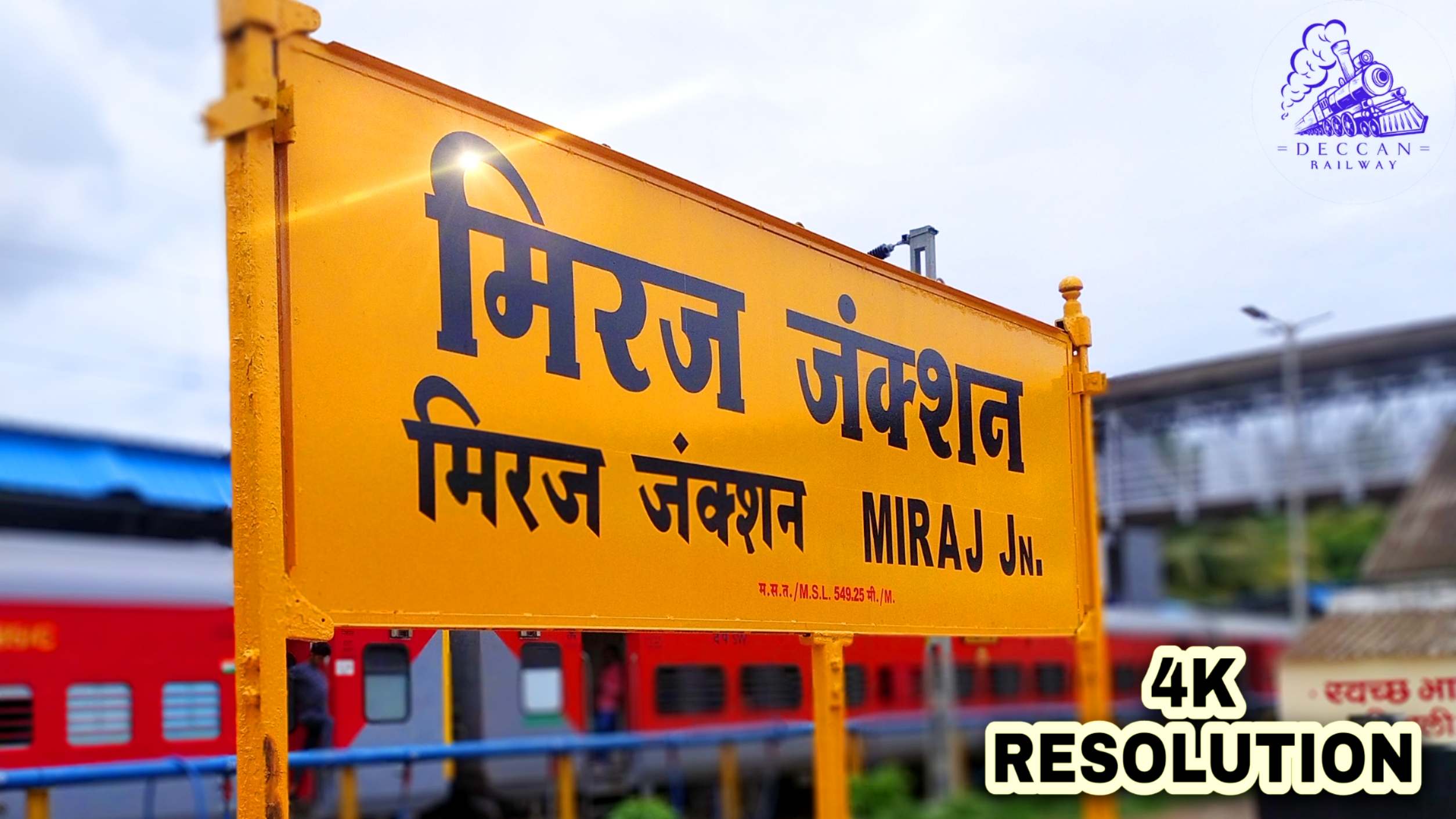
Miraj Junction

The total number of trains is 80.

Rani Chennamma Express

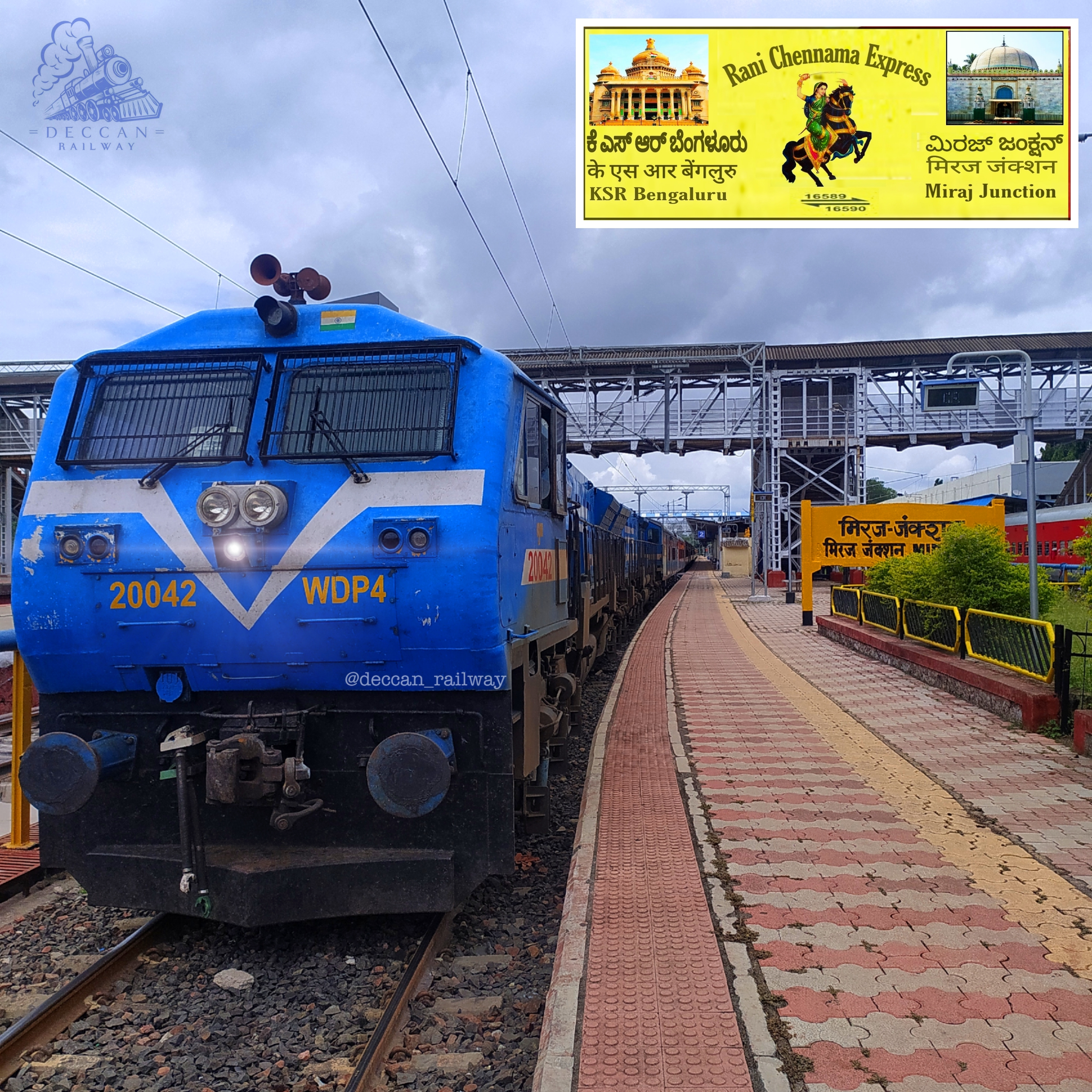
Rani Chennamma Exp

The Rani Chennamma express runs from Miraj junction railway station to Bangalore City railway station and is one of the most prestigious trains of the South Western Railway. The train covers an average distance of 749 km, operating on a daily basis. The train also ran from Bengaluru to Miraj Junction as Kittur Express during the Meter gauge Era.

The Rani Chennamma Express is commonly referred to as the "Queen of South Western Railways" with train number 16589/90. Due to congestion at Miraj, this train's route was extended to Sangli Railway Station recently.

Miraj - Hazrat Nizamuddin Darshan SF Express.

The Darshan Express (Miraj Jn - Hazrat Nizamuddin) was initially started between Pune & Delhi due to Single line constraints between Pune & Miraj. Then, post-doubling, electrification & demands, the train was extended to Miraj Junction with halts at Jejuri, Satara, Karad & Sangli on a weekly basis.

Miraj - Bikaner weekly superfast express Miraj - Bikaner weekly superfast express is a superfast express train connecting Miraj to Bikaner. The train starts its journey from Miraj every Tuesday at 14.25 PM and reaches Bikaner on Wednesday at 20.40 PM. En route, it stops at Sangli, Kirloskarwadi, Karad, Satara, Lonand, Pune, Lonavala, Kalyan, Vasai road, etc.

== History ==
The Miraj station, which is run by the Central Railway, has been established in the history of the Southern Maratha Railway Company. Railway lines were constructed between Koregaon and Miraj in June 1887 by the Southern Maratha Railway Company. Soon after the success of the railway on this route, the Miraj to Belgaum railway was constructed in December 1887. As the importance of the Miraj station in the Sangli district came to the attention of the South Maratha Railway Company, the company decided to rapidly expand the Miraj station and the trains running through this route.

The Southern Maratha Railway was merged with the Madras Railway Company. Indian Railways took over the railway system from Madras Railway in 1944, but the Government of India had to wait until 1949 to take over the system in Miraj because during that time the Miraj-Kolhapur railway line was being run by Rajarshi Shahu Maharaj of Kolhapur, and the Miraj-Sangli railway line was being run by Patwardhan Sarkar of Sangli. After the merging of the institutions, both railway stations were taken over by the Government of India. In 1952, a start was made for the reorganization of the railways. After that, various departments of railways were established to expand the railways. Accordingly, both Miraj and Kolhapur stations were given to the then South-Central Railway. At the same time, the Pune-Bangalore, Miraj-Sangli, and Miraj-Kolhapur meter gauge railway lines were given to the South Central Railway, and the Miraj-Latur narrow gauge railway line was given to the Central Railway. After that, the development of the expansion of the railway in Miraj has slowed down. The Miraj to Koregaon rail line was completed in June 1887, and the Koregaon to Pune line in November 1890.

The Londa to Belgaum railway was started in 1887 and the Belgaum Miraj railway was started in December 1887. As the number of passengers on the railway increased gradually, the trains were also expanded.

The task of creating an identity for Miraj railway station was done by the then South Central and now South Western Railways. The Miraj railway station was included in the Central Railway to further the mainstreaming of the Miraj station on the Maharashtra border.

Miraj has been known for its Geographical location feasibility and excellent connectivity through Rail and Roadways centrally located in many Districts of Maharashtra & Karnataka.

A new railway line from Kudachi to Bagalkote is under construction to further develop railway connectivity from Miraj to important cities of Karnataka like Vijayapura/Bijapur, Bagalkote, Jamkhandi, Athani, Gadag due to huge footfall of Passengers to Miraj for Medical Treatments.

== Major trains ==
The train which originates from Miraj Junction are :

● Miraj Junction–Hazrat Nizamuddin Darshan Superfast Express (12493/12494)

● Miraj–Hubballi Express (17331/17332)

== Background ==
Before 1994, Miraj had a unique combination of three different gauges:

- Miraj-Pune and Miraj-Kolhapur, both with broad gauge lines,
- Miraj-Bangalore meter gauge line,
- Miraj-Pandharpur-Latur narrow gauge line.

By 2008, the entire Latur–Miraj section was converted from narrow gauge to broad gauge, linking Miraj with Solapur and beyond. After the gauge conversion was completed, Miraj only had broad gauge lines.

Miraj had a Steam loco shed in the past near the current Miraj- Bangalore line. Locomotives of the Miraj loco shed ran up to Dharmawaram. After the steam Locomotives were discontinued from service in the '90s, the Miraj loco shed was permanently closed. Trains like Bangalore Mail, Poona Mail, Kittur Express, Mandovi MG Express, Gomantak MG Express, Goa Express, and Koyna Express originated From Miraj Junction.

Currently, the Rani Chennamma Express still originates from Miraj Junction railway station. Miraj junction has facilities for coach maintenance and locomotive maintenance. All DEMU trains of Miraj-Kolhapur, Miraj-Pune, Miraj-Parali, Miraj-Satara, and Miraj-Kurduwadi routs are maintained here.

== Jaldoot water train ==
Due to the drought the Latur city faced for three consecutive years, the summer of 2016 presented itself with extreme scarcity of water. To overcome this issue, a joint project was then requested by Railway Minister Suresh Prabhu and Maharashtra Chief Minister Devendra Fadnavis. After further research, and many changes in plan, Miraj was chosen to transport water to Latur from 342 km. The "Jaldoot" train made its first experimental run on 11 April 2016, carrying 10 tanker wagons, each filled with 50,000 liters of water.

== Trains Haltings at Miraj Jn. ==
| Train No. | Name | Arrival Time | Arrival Day | Category |
|---|---|---|---|---|
| 20669 | SSS Hubbali - Pune Vande Bharat | 09:05 | Su, W, F | VB |
| 20673 | SCSMT Kolhapur - Pune Vande Bharat | 09:05 | M, T, S | VB |
| 20670 | Pune - SSS Hubbali Vande Bharat | 18:40 | M, T, S | VB |
| 20674 | Pune - SCSMT Kolhapur Vande Bharat | 18:40 | Su, W, F | VB |
| 22497 | Shri Ganganagar - Tiruchchirappalli Humsafar Express | 00:45 | W | Hms |
| 22498 | Tiruchchirappalli - Shri Ganganagar Humsafar Express | 02:35 | S | Hms |
| 19668 | Palace Queen Humsafar Express MYF - UDZ | 02:35 | F | Hms |
| 19667 | Palace Queen Humsafar Express UDZ - MYF | 23:35 | T | Hms |
| 12629 | Karnataka Sampark Kranti Express (Via Pune) | 03:25 | W, F | SKR |
| 12630 | Karnataka Sampark Kranti Express (Via Pune) | 16:30 | T, S | SKR |
| 22685 | Yesvantpur - Chandigarh Karnataka Sampark Kranti Express | 03:25 | Su, T | SKR |
| 22686 | Chandigarh - Yesvantpur Karnataka Sampark Kranti Express | 16:30 | Su, W | SKR |
| 12779 | Goa Express | 10:40 | All Days | SF |
| 12780 | Goa Express | 10:40 | All Days | SF |
| 12147 | SCSMT Kolhapur - Hazrat Nizamuddin SF Express | 10:15 | T | SF |
| 12148 | Hazrat Nizamuddin - SCSMT Kolhapur SF Express | 12:00 | F | SF |
| 22156 | SCSMT Kolhapur - Kalaburagi SF Express | 16:30 | All Days | SF |
| 22155 | Kalaburagi - SCSMT Kolhapur SF Express | 12:40 | All Days | SF |
| 12781 | Mysuru - Hazrat Nizamuddin Swarna Jayanti SF Express | 10:15 | S | SF |
| 12782 | Hazrat Nizamuddin - Mysuru Swarna Jayanti SF Express | 12:15 | T | SF |
| 11049 | Ahmedabad - SCSMT Kolhapur Superfast Express | 13:05 | M | Exp |
| 11050 | SCSMT Kolhapur - Ahmedabad Express | 14:35 | S | Exp |
| 16589 | Rani Chennamma Express SBC-SLI | 12:30 | All Days | Exp |
| 16590 | Rani Chennamma Express SLI - SBC | 15:20 | All days | Exp |
| 11097 | Pune - Ernakulam Jn Poorna Express | 04:05 | Su | Exp |
| 11098 | Ernakulam Jn - Pune Poorna Express | 17:30 | T | Exp |
| 16542 | Pandharpur - Yesvantpur Weekly Express | 16:15 | F | Exp |
| 16541 | Yesvantpur -Pandharpur Weekly Express | 08:40 | F | Exp |
| 11045 | SCSMT Kolhapur - Dhanbad Weekly Express | 05:40 | F | Exp |
| 11046 | Dhanbad - SCSMT Kolhapur Weekly Express | 11:25 | W | Exp |
| 11403 | Nagpur - SCSMT Kolhapur Express | 11:55 | Su, W | Exp |
| 11404 | SCSMT Kolhapur - Nagpur Express | 13:50 | M, F | Exp |
| 17411 | CSMT - SCSMT Mahalaxmi Express | 05:35 | All Days | Exp |
| 17412 | SCSMT - CSMT Mahalaxmi Express | 21:50 | All days | Exp |
| 17317 | SSS Hubballi - Dadar Central Express | 21:55 | All days | Exp |
| 17318 | Dadar Central - SSS Hubballi Express | 05:35 | All days | Exp |
| 11029 | SCSMT - CSMT Koyna Express | 18:52 | All days | Exp |
| 11030 | CSMT - SCSMT Koyna Express | 09:22 | All days | Exp |
| 11022 | Tirunelveli - Dadar Central Chalukya Express (Via Yesvantpur) | 20:40 | T, F, S | Exp |
| 11021 | Dadar Central - Tirunelveli Chalukya Express (Via Yesvantpur) | 06:45 | Su, W, T | Exp |
| 17415 | TPTY - SCSMT Haripriya Express | 15:00 | All days | Exp |
| 17416 | SCSMT - TPTY Haripriya Express | 13:10 | All days | Exp |
| 11036 | MYS - DR Sharavati Express | 20:40 | Su | Exp |
| 11035 | DR - MYS Sharavati Express | 06:45 | F | Exp |
| 16505 | Gandhidham - KSR Bengaluru Express | 07:40 | W | Exp |
| 16506 | KSR Bengaluru - Gandhidham Express | 12:40 | Su | Exp |
| 16210 | Mysuru - Ajmer Express | 12:40 | F | Exp |
| 16209 | Ajmer - Mysuru Express | 07:40 | M, S | Exp |
| 16532 | KSR Bengaluru - Ajmer Garib Nawaz Express | 12:40 | S | Exp |
| 16531 | Ajmer - KSR Bengaluru Garib Nawaz Express | 07:40 | T | Exp |
| 11040 | Gondia - SCSMT Maharashtra Express | 09:45 | All Days | Exp |
| 11039 | SCSMT - Gondia Maharashtra Express | 15:45 | All Days | Exp |
| 16533 | Bhagat ki Kothi - KSR Bengaluru Express (Via Guntakal) | 07:40 | T | Exp |
| 16534 | KSR Bengaluru - Bhagat ki Kothi Express (Via Guntakal) | 12:40 | M | Exp |
| 11006 | Puducherry - Dadar Central Express | 20:40 | M, W, T | Exp |
| 11005 | Dadar Central - Puducherry Express | 06:45 | M, T, S | Exp |
| 01024 | SCSMT Kolhapur Special Fare Special - Pune Jn. | 00:37 | All Days | Exp |
| 01023 | Pune Jn. - SCSMT Kolhapur Special Fare Special | 03:17 | All Days | Exp |
| 11027 | Dadar Central - Satara Express | 11:05 | M, T, S | Exp |
| 11028 | Satara - Dadar Central Express Via Kurduwadi | 18:25 | M, T, S | Exp |
| 11426 | SCSMT Kolhapur - Pune DEMU Express | 06:10 | All Days | DEMU |
| 11425 | Pune - SCSMT DEMU Express | 18:00 | All Days | DEMU |
| 71423 | Satara - SCSMT Kolhapur DEMU Special | 18:08 | All Days | DEMU |
| 71424 | SCSMT Kolhapur - Satara DEMU Special | 18:05 | All Days | DEMU |
| 71430 | SCSMT Kolhapur - Sangli DEMU Special | 19:48 | All Days | DEMU |

== Connecting Major Cities ==
- Mumbai, Pune, Nagpur, Ahemdabad, Bangalore,Delhi, Hubballi, Chandigarh, Ernakulam, Ajmer, Jodhpur,Puducherry, Dhanbad, Vasco, Mangalore,Udaipur, Mysuru, Tirupati And More
- As of 2023, Miraj is the Highest revenue-generating Railway station under the A1 category of Pune Division after Pune & Falls.

After completing the doubling and electrification of the entire Pune-Miraj-Bangaluru line, many new trains will start from Miraj towards Chennai, Nanded, Howrah, Mangalore, etc.

== Station Expectation/lack of Facility ==
Miraj railway station is always neglected by the railways. No new trains have started from the Miraj railway station in the last several years. In addition, no new trains have been extended to Miraj.

Hubbli Division is desperate due to the indifference of Pune Division

A large number of passengers travel from Miraj railway station on all four routes namely Pune, Solapur, Belgaum, and Kolhapur. Passengers are facing inconvenience as railway trains are not available. Because of this, the expansion of railway trains along with the introduction of new railway trains has been the demand of railway passenger organizations including the Miraj Railway Action Committee for the last several years.

Miraj junction will be developed as a Model station under the Amrut Bharat Station Scheme. RLDA is looking this project.
