= Davangere railway station =

Railway Station in Karnataka, India

Davanagere Davangere

General information
- Location: State Highway 76, Davangere, Karnataka; India
- Coordinates: 14.4666°N 75.4292°E
- Elevation: 598 metres (1,962 ft)
- Owner: Indian Railways
- Operator: South Western Railway zone
- Line: Bangalore–Arsikere–Hubli line
- Platforms: 2
- Tracks: 4

Construction
- Parking: Yes
- Cycle facilities: Yes
- Accessible: Disabled access

Other information
- Status: Active
- Station code: DVG
- Zone(s): South Western Railway zone
- Division(s): Mysore
- Fare zone: South Western Railway
Location
- Location within Karnataka

Davanagere railway station, formerly Davangere railway station (station code: DVG) is a railway station in Davanagere, state of Karnataka, India. It is one of the major railway stations in the South Western Railway zone of Indian Railways. The station is situated on P.B. road in Davanagere, exactly opposite to the city municipal corporation. It was created during the British rule and was renovated recently.. Amenities inside station include free Google Wifi, filtered water facility, refreshment stalls and retiring rooms.

== Statistics ==
- Station Name: Davanagere
- Indian Railway Station Code: DVG
- Number of platforms: 2
