= Belagavi railway station =

Railway station in Karnataka

Belagavi Beḷagāvi

General information
- Other names: Belgaum
- Location: Belgaum, Karnataka
- Coordinates: 15°50′56″N 74°30′32″E
- Elevation: 752 m (2,467 ft)
- System: Indian Railways station
- Owner: Indian Railways
- Line: Pune–Miraj–Londa line
- Platforms: 4

Construction
- Structure type: Standard (on ground station)
- Parking: Available

Other information
- Status: Functional
- Station code: BGM
- Fare zone: South Western Railway zone
Location
- Location within Karnataka

Belagavi railway station, formerly Belgaum railway station (Station code: BGM) is a railway station under South Western Railways and it is the primary railway station serving Belagavi in Kittur Karnataka. It is a "A" Category station.

== History ==
In 1881, the Bombay Eastern Deccan Railway was under construction with William Michell the Engineer-in-Charge. This line immediately upon opening became the Bijapur branch of the Southern Mahratta Railway.

The Southern Mahratta Railway (SMR) was founded in 1882 to construct a metre-gauge (MG) railway between Hotgi and Gadag (opened to traffic in 1884), one of the "famine lines" set up with a guarantee. In the same year (1882), it was contracted by the Indian state of Mysore to work the several metre-gauge lines that the Mysore State had built or was in the course of construction.

In 1888, a line was extended from Londa towards the Portuguese colony of Goa where it connected with the Marmagao line at Castle Rock. (From 1902 this line was leased as the West of India Portuguese Railway.) By 1890, this line extended from Londa eastwards via Guntakal to Bezwada, and northwards to Poona, via Belgavi & Miraj turning the SMR from an assortment of branches to a real railway network. In 1908, the SMR merged with the Madras Railway (MR) to form the Madras and Southern Mahratta Railway (M&SMR)

== Development ==
Preliminary Engg-cum Traffic Survey for a new line between Belagavi–Sawantwadi (114.6 km [71.2 mi]). Physical Survey completed and Report is under preparation PET Survey for new line between Belagavi–Hubballi via Kitturu (91.00 km [56.54 mi]). Physical Survey completed and Report is under preparation
