= Satara railway station =

Railway Station in Maharashta, India

Satara Railway Station
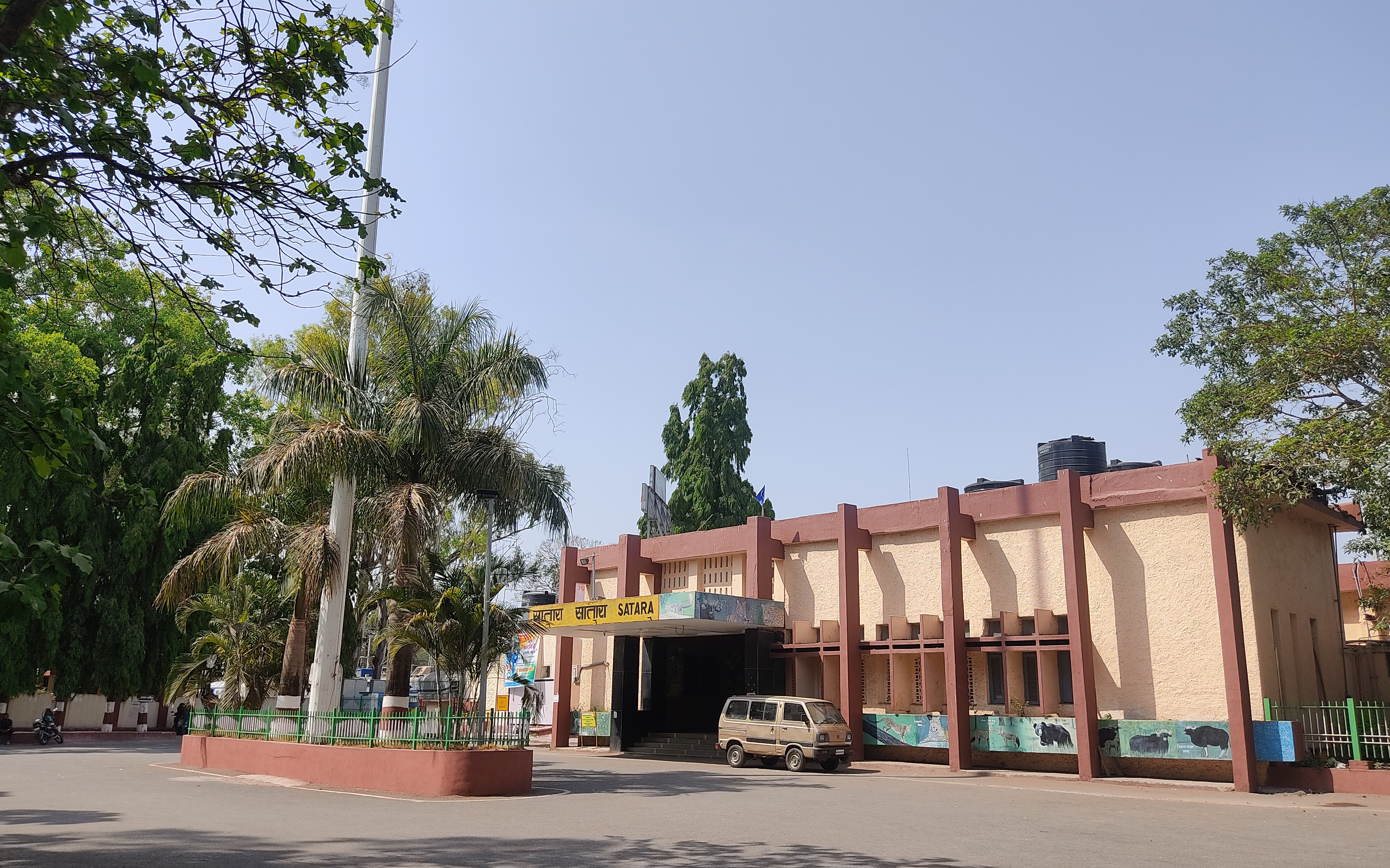

General information
- Location: Satara; India
- Coordinates: 17.6884°N 74.0633°E
- Elevation: 637 metres (2,090 ft)
- Owner: Indian Railways
- Line: Pune–Miraj line
- Platforms: 3
- Tracks: 5
- Connections: Auto stand

Construction
- Parking: yes
- Cycle facilities: yes

Other information
- Status: Functioning
- Station code: STR
- Fare zone: Central Railway
Location
- Location within India Location within Maharashtra

Satara railway station is the main railway station in the Satara district, in the city of Satara, Maharashtra. Its code is STR. The station lies on the Pune–Miraj line of the Central Railways and is administered by the Pune Railway Division.

== Design ==
The station consists of four platforms out of which all four platforms are in fully functioning condition. While renovation of the station the main entrance is designed as a big dome considering a historical background of Satara City.

== Connection ==
This railway station connects Satara with major Indian cities such as Mumbai, Pune, Bengaluru, Nagpur, Miraj, Sangli, Kolhapur, Ahmedabad, Jaipur, Delhi, Goa through express trains.

== Passenger trains ==
- Satara–Kolhapur
- Satara–Pune
- Pune–Kolhapur
- Kolhapur–Pune
- Proposed Satara Solapur railway line

== Express trains ==
- Sri Ganganagar–Tiruchirappalli Humsafar Express
- Sahyadri Express
- Koyna Express
- Mahalaxmi Express
- Maharashtra Express
- Goa Express
- Satara-Dadar Express
- SCSMT Kolhapur–Pune Vande Bharat Express
