= Sangli railway station =

Railway Station in Maharashtra, India

Sangli

General information
- Location: Market Yard, Sangli; India
- System: Indian railway station
- Owner: Indian Railways
- Operator: Indian Railways
- Line: Pune–Sangli–Hubli-Bangalore line
- Platforms: 5
- Tracks: 12
- Train operators: Indian Railways

Construction
- Structure type: RCC
- Parking: Yes, Paid
- Cycle facilities: Yes
- Accessible: Yes

Other information
- Status: Active
- Station code: SLI
- Fare zone: Pune Central Railway

Other services
Waiting Rooms, VIP Lounge, Bank ATM, ATVM Machine, Infant Feeding Room, Amul food parlour, Paper stall, Canteen, Computerized reservation office, Free Wheel Chair Service, Free WIFI Internet service
Location
- Location within India Location within Maharashtra

Sangli railway station is a major railway station serving the city of Sangli in Maharashtra, India. It is classified as a Class A station within the Pune Railway Division of the Central Railway Zone under Indian Railways.

== Location and infrastructure ==
The station is situated at an elevation of 558 metres above sea level. The station has five platforms and operates on a double electric broad-gauge railway line as of 2020. The station facilitates the stoppage of 64 trains, with 3 trains originating and 3 terminating at the station. Among these services are 4 Vande Bharat high-speed trains. Additionally, Pune Airport is located approximately 200 kilometres from Sangli.

== Recent developments ==
The General Manager of Central Railway has granted in-principle approval for the construction of a PIT line at Sangli Railway Station. This development will enable the origination and termination of long-distance trains at Sangli, enhancing connectivity to other cities. The new PIT line will also facilitate the introduction of local trains, such as the Sangli–Pandharpur, Sangli–Solapur, Sangli–Kurduvadi, Sangli–Belgaum, Sangli–Londa, and Sangli–Vasco services.

Before 1971, Sangli was the terminus of the narrow-gauge Miraj–Sangli railway line. Following gauge conversion in 1971, the branch line was closed, and Sangli was incorporated into the Miraj–Pune main line. The old station, located in the heart of Sangli city, was demolished in 2003. Several upgrades have been made at the station, including the installation of coach display units and paved platform surfaces.

== Demand for train extensions ==
There is a strong demand from passengers in both Belgaum and Sangli districts for the extension of the Mysuru–Dharwar Express up to Sangli. In response, the Railway Minister of State, Mr. Suresh Angadi, approved the extension. Furthermore, with the completion of electrification and doubling of the Pune–Sangli–Miraj–Bangalore line, Sangli has become a pivotal station along this route. Ongoing efforts from the local Railway Action Committee and Member of Parliament, Mr. Sanjaykaka Patil, have resulted in the Railway Board's approval of the extension of the Rani Chennamma Express and Parli Vaijnath DEMU Express to Sangli.

== Train services originating at Sangli railway station ==
=== 16589/90 Sangli–KSR Bengaluru City Rani Chennamma Express ===
- Departure from Sangli: 15:00 (daily)
- Arrival at KSR Bengaluru: 06:15 (next day)
- En route stops: Miraj, Ugar, Kudachi, Raybag, Chikodi Road, Ghatprabha, Gokak Road, Belagavi, Londa Junction, Alnavar Junction, Dharwad, SSS Hubli Junction, Davangere, MS Haveri, Ranibennur, Arsikere Junction, Tiptur, Tumkur, and Yeshvantpur Junction.

=== 11411/12 Sangli–Parli Vaijnath DEMU Express ===
- Departure from Sangli: 20:35 (daily)
- Arrival at Parli Vaijnath: 06:15 (next day)
- En route stops: Miraj Junction, Arag, Salgare, Kavathe Mahankal, Dhalgaon, Jath Road, Sangola, Pandharpur, Kurduwadi Junction, Barshi, Dhrashiv, Latur, and Latur Road Junction.

=== 01550 Kolhapur–Sangli DEMU ===
- Departure from Kolhapur: 18:30 (daily)
- Arrival at Sangli: 20:00 (daily)
- En route stops: Valivade, Hatkanangale, Nimshirgaon Tamdalge, Jaysingpur, Miraj Junction, and Vishrambag.

=== 01549 Sangli–Miraj DEMU ===
- Departure from Sangli: 19:05 (daily)
- Arrival at Miraj: 19:20 (daily)
- En route stop: Vishrambag.

=== Vande Bharat High-Speed Trains Stopping at Sangli ===
1. Hubli–Pune Vande Bharat
  - Departure from Sangli: 09:15
2. Pune–Hubli Vande Bharat
  - Departure from Sangli: 18:10
3. Kolhapur–Pune Vande Bharat
  - Departure from Sangli: 09:15
4. Pune–Kolhapur Vande Bharat
  - Departure from Sangli: 18:10

== Other major train services from Sangli railway station ==
Sangli Railway Station serves as a key hub for train services connecting to various cities across India, including Bangalore, Pandharpur, Mysore, Belagavi, Hubli, Goa, Madgaon, Pondicherry, Tirunelveli, Mangalore, Cochin, Madurai, Salem, Erode, Davangere, Kozhikode, and Kolhapur. Some notable train services include:

- 16590 Sangli–Bengaluru Rani Chennamma Express – Departs at 15:00 daily.
- 12494 Darshan Superfast Express – Departs at 21:40 on Saturdays.
- 12147 Kolhapur–Delhi Nizamuddin Express – Departs at 10:32 on Tuesdays.
- 12781 Mysore–Delhi Nizamuddin Swarna Jayanti Express – Departs at 10:32 on Saturdays.

== Connections to major Indian cities ==
Sangli station also connects to major urban centres, such as Pune, Mumbai, Surat, Vadodara, Ahmedabad, Udaipur, Jodhpur, Ajmer, Bikaner, Delhi, Bhopal, Agra, Nagpur, Gandhidham, and Ratlam.
