= Hatkanangale railway station =

Railway Station in Maharashtra, India

General information
- Location: Hatkanangale, Maharashtra; India
- Coordinates: 16.4457°N 74.2515°E
- Elevation: 591 metres (1,939 ft)
- System: Indian Railways station
- Owner: Indian Railways
- Operator: Central Railway
- Platforms: 2
- Tracks: Single diesel line
- Connections: Auto stand

Construction
- Structure type: Standard (on-ground station)
- Parking: No
- Cycle facilities: No

Other information
- Status: Functioning
- Station code: HTK
- Zone(s): Central Railway
- Division(s): Pune
Location
- Location within India Location within Maharashtra

Hatkanangale railway station is a major railway station in Kolhapur district, Maharashtra. Its code is HTK. It serves Hatkanangale city and is also the nearest railway station for the city of Ichalkaranji, 7 km away. The station consists of two platforms. The platforms are not well sheltered. It lacks many facilities including water and sanitation.

== Trains ==
Some of the trains that run through the station are:

- Haripriya Express
- Koyna Express
- Mahalaxmi Express
- Maharashtra Express
- Rani Chennamma Express
- Sahyadri Express
- CSMT Kolhapur–Gorakhpur Link Express
- Hyderabad–CSMT Kolhapur Express
