= Latvade =

Village in Maharashtra

- Village
- Location in Mahashtra, India Latvade (India)
- Coordinates: 16°50′2.13″N 74°18′54.68″E
- Country: India
- State: Maharashtra
- Division: Pune Division
- District: Kolhapur District

Languages
  - Official: Maithili, Hindi
- Time zone: UTC+5:30 (IST)
- Website: www.pethvadgaon.com

Latvade is a village, located 3 km from Peth Vadgaon. Taluka is Hatkanangale in Kolhapur district in the Indian state of Maharashtra.

== Demographics ==
According to provisional results of 2011 census, the population of Latvade is 5,555, with 2,867 males and 2,688 females. There are 1,081 households.

== Temples ==
Narsinha temple is a very old temple. The biggest celebratory function is on Narsinha Jayanti. Lotleshwar temple is another local temple. This temple is a very old construction.
