= Manuguru–CSMT Kolhapur Express =

Shri Chhatrapati Shahu Maharaj Terminus Kolhapur - Manuguru Express
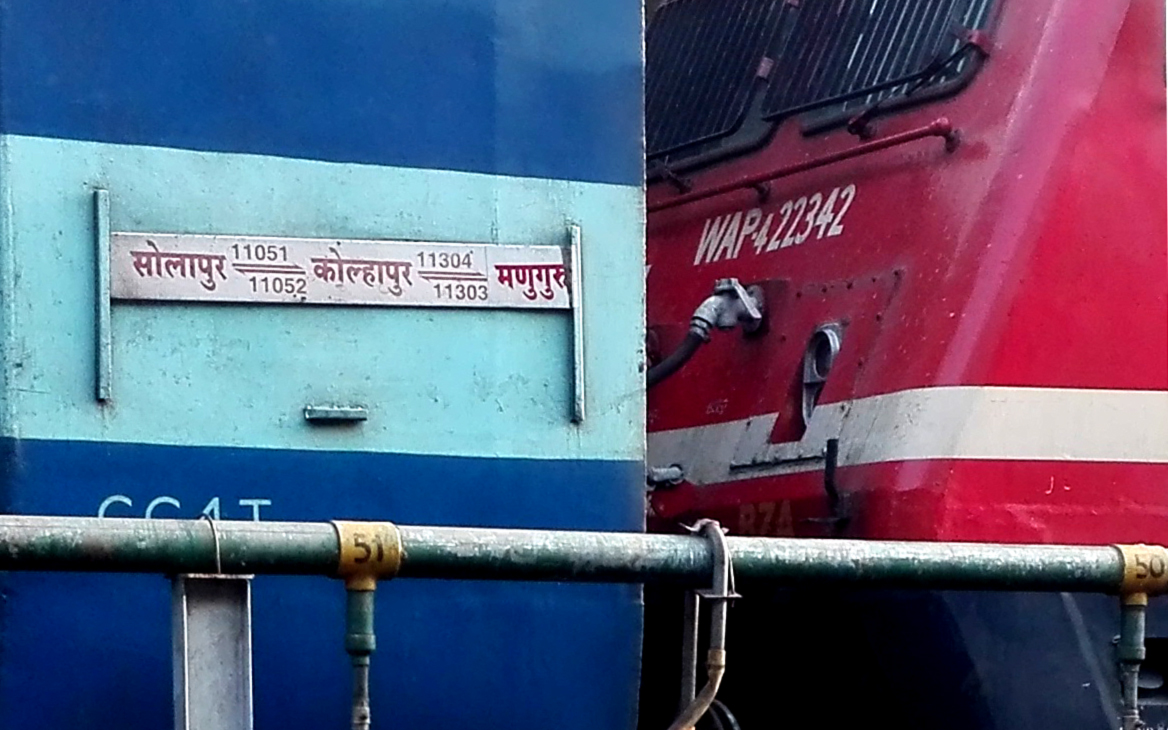

Overview
- Service type: Express
- First service: 14 March 2018; 8 years ago
- Last service: 20 November 2021; 4 years ago
- Successor: 17071/72 Hyderabad-Belagavi Express, 17073/74 Secunderabad-Belagavi Express, 17075/76 Charlapalli-Belagavi Express from 2026
- Current operator: Central Railway zone

Route
- Termini: Manuguru (MUGR); Shri Chhatrapati Shahu Maharaj Terminus (KOP)
- Stops: 33
- Distance travelled: 997 km (620 mi)
- Average journey time: 23 hours 50 minutes
- Service frequency: Daily (Note: Runs seven days in a week for every direction.)
- Train number: 11303/11304

On-board services
- Classes: AC 2 Tier, AC 3 Tier, Sleeper 3 Tier, Unreserved
- Seating arrangements: No
- Sleeping arrangements: Yes
- Catering facilities: No
- Entertainment facilities: No

Technical
- Rolling stock: 2
- Track gauge: 1,676 mm (5 ft 6 in)
- Operating speed: 47 km/h (29 mph)
Route map
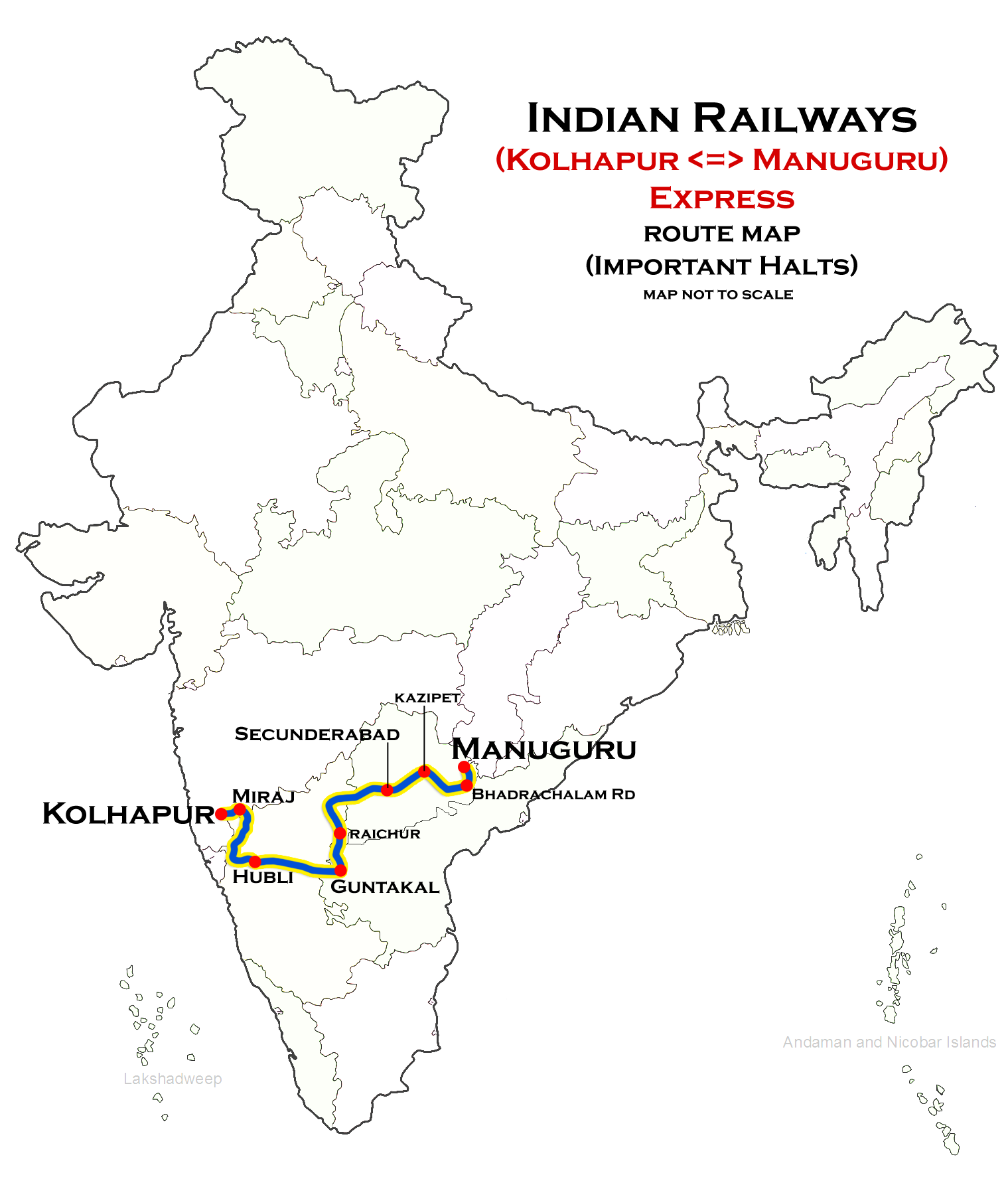

Manuguru - Shri Chhatrapati Shahu Maharaj Terminus Kolhapur Express was an express train of the Indian Railways connecting Shri Chhatrapati Shahu Maharaj Terminus in Maharashtra and Manuguru of Telangana. It was permanently cancelled now.

There is a consideration to terminate this train at either Miraj Jn or Belgaum.

Passengers demand termination at Miraj as Manuguru express is the only train connecting Western Maharashtra with Hyderabad

== Service ==
The 11303/Manuguru - SCSMT Kolhapur Express has an average speed of 42 km/h and covers 997 km in 23 hrs 30 mins. 11304/SCSMT Kolhapur - Manuguru Express has an average speed of 41 km/h and 997 km in 23 hrs 10 mins.

== Route and halts ==
The important halts of the train are:

- Manuguru (From 15 March 2018)
- Bhadrachalam Road (From 15 March 2018)
- Dornakal Junction (From 15 March 2018)
- Mahabubabad (From 15 March 2018)
- Warangal (From 15 March 2018)
- Kazipet (From 15 March 2018)
- Jangaon (From 15 March 2018)
- Bhongir (From 15 March 2018)
- Secunderabad (From 15 March 2018)
- Hyderabad Deccan (Till 15 March 2018)
- Begumpet (From 15 March 2018)
- Vikarabad Junction
- Guntakal Junction
- Bellary Junction
- Hosapete Junction
- Gadag Junction
- Hubli Junction
- Dharwad
- Londa Junction
- Belgaum
- Miraj Junction
- Hatkanangale
- Shri Chhatrapati Shahu Maharaj Terminus

== Coach composite ==
The train consists of 15 coaches :

- 1 AC II Tier
- 1 AC III Tier
- 7 Sleeper Coaches
- 4 General
- 2 Second-class Luggage/parcel van

== Traction ==
Both trains are hauled by a Lallaguda Loco Shed based WAP-7 or WAP-4 electric locomotive from Manuguru to Guntakal and from Guntakal it is hauled by a Guntakal Loco Shed based WDM 3A, WDM 3D, WDG3A diesel locomotive as far as Kolhapur and vice versa.

== Rake sharing ==
It share its rake with 11051/11052 Solapur - SCSMT Kolhapur Express.

== Direction reversal ==
Train Reverses its direction 2 times:

- Miraj Junction
- Guntakal Junction
- Bhadrachalam Road (i.e., from 15 March 2018)

== See also ==
- Solapur - SCSMT Kolhapur Express

== Notes ==
- Will be extended to Manuguru from 15 March 2018 via Begumpet railway station, Secunderabad Junction, Bhongir railway station, Jangaon railway station, Kazipet Junction railway station Warangal railway station, Mahabubabad, Dornakal Junction railway station, Bhadrachalam Road.
- New Time Table
