= Solapur–CSMT Kolhapur Express =

Solapur - Shri Chhatrapati Shahu Maharaj Terminus Kolhapur Express
Overview
- Service type: Express
- First service: 21 February 2011; 14 years ago
- Current operator: Central Railway zone

Route
- Termini: Solapur (SUR); Shri Chhatrapati Shahu Maharaj Terminus (KOP)
- Stops: 7
- Distance travelled: 316 km (196 mi)
- Average journey time: 5 hours 40 minutes
- Service frequency: Daily (Note: Runs seven days in a week for every direction.)
- Train number: 22133/22134

On-board services
- Classes: AC 2 Tier, AC 3 Tier, Sleeper 3 Tier, Unreserved
- Seating arrangements: No
- Sleeping arrangements: Yes
- Catering facilities: No
- Entertainment facilities: No

Technical
- Rolling stock: 2
- Track gauge: 1,676 mm (5 ft 6 in)
- Operating speed: 56 km/h (35 mph)

Solapur - Shri Chhatrapati Shahu Maharaj Terminus Kolhapur Superfast Express was a superfast train of the Indian Railways connecting Shri Chhatrapati Shahu Maharaj Terminus, Kolhapur in Maharashtra and Solapur of Maharashtra. It was permanently cancelled now.

== Service ==
The 22133/Solapur - Shri Chhatrapati Shahu Maharaj Terminus Kolhapur Express has an average speed of 56 km/h and covers 319 km in 5 hrs 40 mins. 22134/Shri Chhatrapati Shahu Maharaj Terminus Kolhapur - Solapur Express has an average speed of 56 km/h and 319 km in 5 hrs 40 mins.

== Route and halts ==
The important halts of the train are:

- Solapur
- Kurduvadi Junction
- Modnimb
- Pandharpur
- Sangola
- Dhalgaon
- Kavathe Mahankal
- Miraj Junction
- Shri Chhatrapati Shahu Maharaj Terminus

== Coach composite ==
The train consists of 15 coaches :

- 1 AC II Tier
- 1 AC III Tier
- 7 Sleeper Coaches
- 4 General
- 2 Second-class Luggage/parcel van

== Traction ==
Both trains are hauled by a Pune Loco Shed based WDM-3A diesel locomotive from Solapur to Kolhapur.

== Rake sharing ==
It share its rake with 11303/11304 Manuguru - SCSMT Kolhapur Express.

== Direction reversal ==
Train Reverses its direction times:

- Miraj Junction
