= Bhadole =

Village in Maharashtra

- Village
- Location in Maharashtra, India Bhadole (India)
- Coordinates: 16°51′31″N 74°19′54″E
- Country: India
- State: Maharashtra
- District: Kolhapur
- Named for: Famous for MOHARAM in kolhapur district

Government
  - Type: Gram Panchayat
  - Body: Bhadole Gram Panchayat

Population (2011)
  - Total: 20,000
- Demonym: Bhadolekar

Languages
  - Official: Marathi
- Time zone: UTC+5:30 (IST)
- PIN: 416112
- Telephone code: 0230
- Vehicle registration: MH-09

Bhadole is a large village situated along the Warana River basin in the Hatkanangale Taluka of Kolhapur District in the state of Maharashtra, India.

== Demographics ==
As per Population Census 2011, the Bhadole village has in total 5,000 families residing in village with a population of 25,083 of which 12,083 are males while 12,000 are females. Average Sex Ratio of Bhadole village is 928. Child Sex Ratio for the Bhadole as per census is 824.

| area_total_ha = 3000 | area_total_km2 = 30 Bhadole village has a total geographical area of approximately 3,000 hectares (30 km²).

== Development ==
The village has witnessed gradual development in recent years, particularly in infrastructure, agriculture, and basic public amenities. Local organizations, including the Janseva Vikas Aghadi, have contributed to the development of the village.

== Literacy ==
In 2011, literacy rate of Bhadole village was 81.42%. In Bhadole Male literacy stands at 89.17% while female literacy rate was 73.20%.

== Religious places ==
Hazrat Sheikh Chand Saheb Dargah is a religious shrine located in Bhadole village in Hatkanangale taluka of Kolhapur district, Maharashtra, India. The dargah is regarded as an important place of worship by local devotees and is associated with the religious traditions of the region.An annual Urs is held every year during April, generally between 17 and 20 April, attracting devotees from Bhadole and nearby areas.The dargah is also associated with the local Muharram traditions of Bhadole and holds religious significance for many residents of the village.

As per constitution of India and Panchyati Raj Act (1992), Bhadole village is administered by Sarpanch (Head of Village) who is elected representative of village with the help of 16 members and Gram Sevak.GovernancNearby PlaceNearby places (with distances) are Kini (3 km), Vathar Tarf Vadgaon (8.3 km), Peth Vadgaon (3.8 km), Shigaon (4.4 km), Hatkanangale (23.5 km), Kolhapur (26.2 km) via NH-4, Jotiba (24.9 km), Panhala (33 km), Warananagar (17.3 km).

== Education ==
Jai Shivrai Shikshan Prasarak Mandal's Bhadole Highschool Bhadole is a premier school in village and also has Z.P. Schools for boys as well as girls.
