= Atigre =

Village in Maharashtra

Atigre अतिग्रे
- Village
- Interactive map of Atigre
- Coordinates: 16°44′21″N 74°21′53″E
- Country: India
- State: Maharashtra
- District: Kolhapur
- Taluka: Hatkanangale

Government
  - Type: Grampanchayat

Area
  - Total: 662 ha (1,640 acres)

Population
  - Total: 3,729
- Time zone: Indian Standard Time
- Area code: 416118

Atigre is a village in Kolhapur district in the Indian state of Maharashtra, in western India. It is situated on Kolhapur-Sangli Highway about 410 kilometres (250 mi) from Mumbai, 17 km from Kolhapur, 8 km from Hatkanangle, 35 km from Sangli, and 12 km from Ichalkaranji.

Near Atigre is a small lake, "Shahu Talav", which has provided drinking and irrigation water for the village for many years.

In 1997, the population of Atigre was about 3000. Many of the people living in Atigre are employed as teachers.

== Education ==
There are many schools in this village: the "Anganvadi" for the kindergarten, the "Vidya Mandir Atigre" for primary school for Marathi medium education and high school for Marathi medium people learning up to 10th std. Students can obtain an international-level education at Sanjay Ghodavat Technical Institute.

== Festivals ==
Tourism is an industry in the village. There is a statue of Bahubali and a well-known temple, the "Maruti" temple. During Sri Ram Navami, which generally occurs in the months of March and April, a large number of devotees celebrate the three-day "Yatra" Festival in memory of Rama. It occurs on the ninth day, or navami, beginning on the "no moon day" or Amavasya, and continuing during the time of the waxing moon, "Shukla Paksha". Celebrations and festivities begin with prayer to the Surya Deva early in the morning. At midday a devotional service to him is performed with Bhakti and piety. As part of their belief in Maruti, the people in the village eat only vegetarian food, and in particular the Marathi food "Puran Poli" is served at this festival.Atigre village has a dargah of Hazrat Gabi Pir Baba near Shahu Lake since ancient times. His Urs takes place in Bahubij
