= Koyna Express =

Train in India

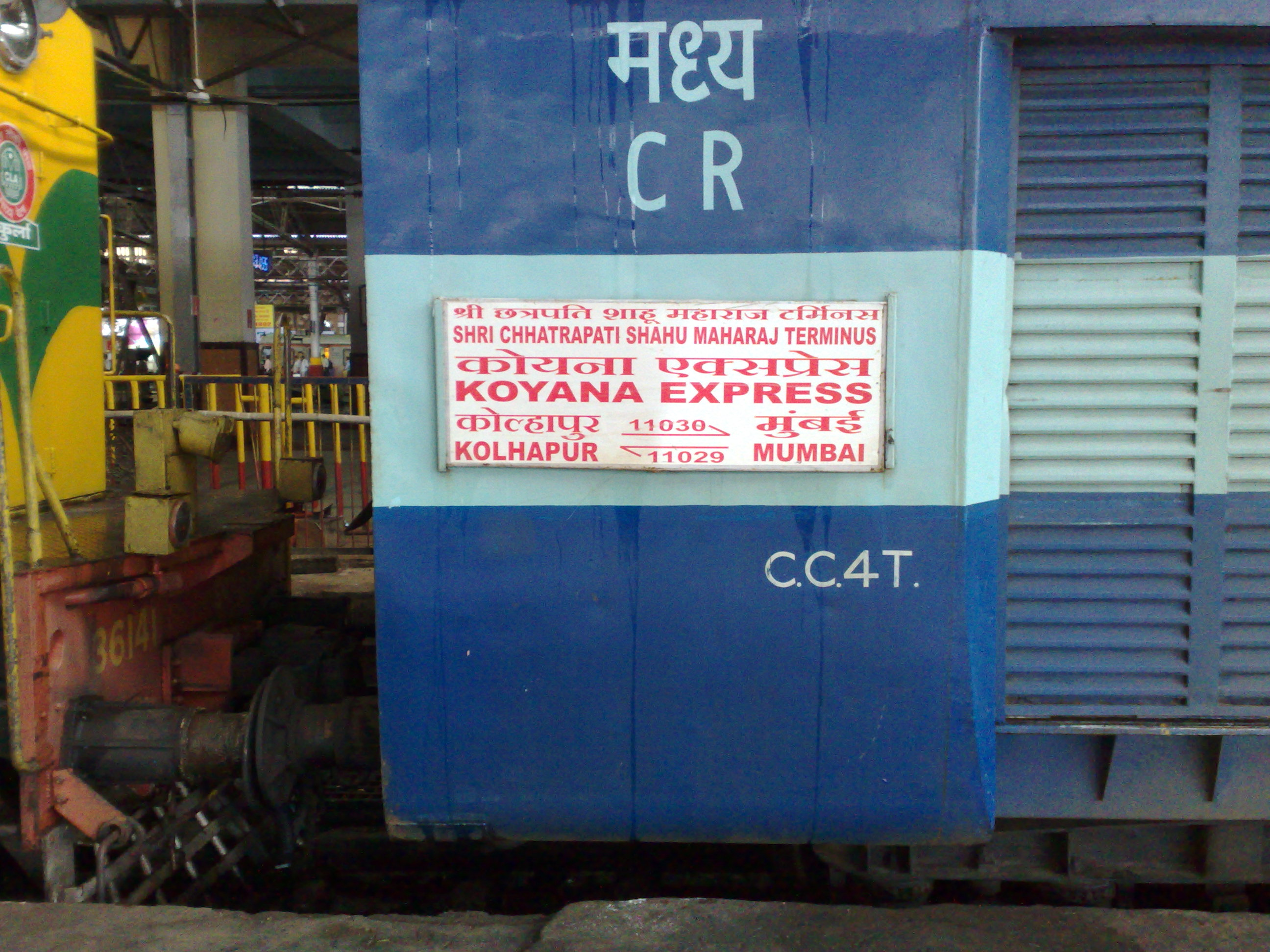
- Koyna Express train board.

Overview
- Service type: Express
- Locale: Maharashtra
- First service: 2 August 1920; 106 years ago
- Current operator: Central Railway

Route
- Termini: CSMT Mumbai (CSMT); SCSMT Kolhapur (KOP)
- Stops: 27
- Distance travelled: 518 km (322 mi)
- Average journey time: 11 hours 30 minutes
- Service frequency: Daily
- Train number: 11029 / 11030

On-board services
- Classes: AC Chair Car, Second Class Seating, AC 3 Tier, AC 2 Tier, General Unreserved
- Seating arrangements: Yes
- Sleeping arrangements: No
- Auto-rack arrangements: Overhead racks
- Catering facilities: No Pantry Car but catering available
- Observation facilities: Large windows
- Baggage facilities: No
- Other facilities: Below the seats

Technical
- Rolling stock: ICF coach
- Track gauge: 1,676 mm (5 ft 6 in)
- Operating speed: 110 km/h (68 mph) maximum, 45 km/h (28 mph) average including halts.
Route map
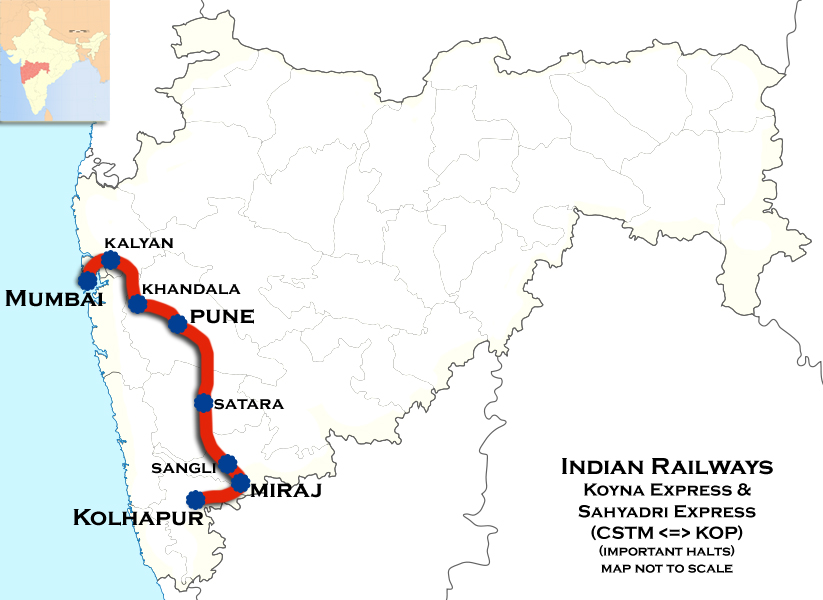

The 11029 / 11030 Koyna Express is daily express trains belonging to Indian Railways that run between Mumbai and Kolhapur in India. It operates as train number 11029 from Mumbai CSMT to Kolhapur SCSMT and as train number 11030 in the reverse direction. The other two daily trains on the Mumbai and Kolhapur run are 11023/24 Sahyadri Express & 17411/12 Mahalaxmi Express. When introduced, this train was run between Bombay Victoria Terminus (VT) (now renamed as Mumbai CSMT) and Miraj Junction as Bombay–Miraj Koyna Express, but latter extended up to Kolhapur. This train is named after the Koyna river that flows across Maharashtra.

== Coaches ==
The 11029/11030 Koyna Express presently has 2 AC Chair Car, AC sleeper car 3,4 2nd Class seating 2nd class sleeper car 6 & 4 General Unreserved coaches.

As with most train services in India, coach composition may be amended at the discretion of Indian Railways depending on demand.

== Service ==
The 11029 Koyna Express covers the distance of 518 kilometres in 11 hours 45 mins (44.09 km/h) and 12 hours 45 mins as 11030 Koyna Express (40.89 km/h).

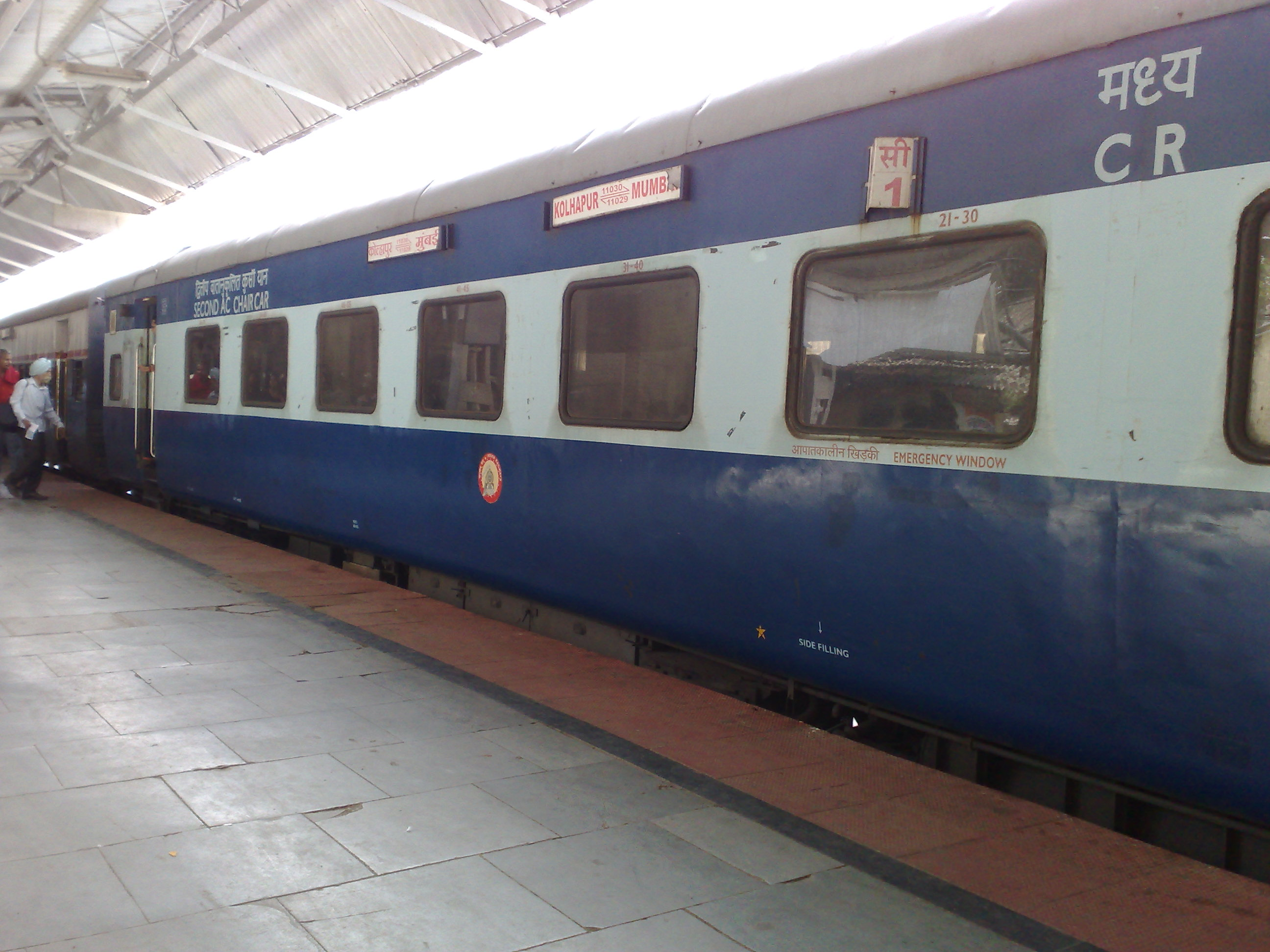
Koyna Express – AC Chair Car coach

== Traction ==
Earlier a Kazipet-based WDM-3A, hauled the train, followed by a Kalyan Loco Shed based WCAM-3 electric locomotive from end to end. Now the train is hauled by a Bhusawal based WAP-4 locomotive

== Timetable ==
11029 Koyna Express leaves Mumbai CSMT every day at 08:40 hrs IST and reaches Kolhapur SCSMT at 20:35 hrs IST the same day.

11030 Koyna Express leaves Kolhapur SCSMT every day at 07:55 hrs IST and reaches Mumbai CSMT at 20:35 hrs IST the same day.

Station code	Station name	11029 – Mumbai CSMT to Kolhapur SCSMT		Distance from source in km	Day	11030 – Kolhapur SCSMT to Mumbai CSMT		Distance from source in km	Day
Station code	Station name	Arrival	Departure	Distance from source in km	Day	Arrival	Departure	Distance from source in km	Day
CSMT	Mumbai CSMT	Source	08:40	0	1	20:15	Destination	518	1
DR	Dadar	08:53	08:55	9	1	19:43	19:45	509	1
TNA	Thane	09:13	09:15	34	1	19:13	19:15	485	1
KYN	Kalyan Junction	09:33	09:35	54	1	18:48	18:50	465	1
KJT	Karjat	10:18	10:20	100	1	18:18	18:20	419	1
KAD	Khandala	10:58	11:00	124	1	17:23	17:25	394	1
LNL	Lonavala	11:08	11:10	128	1	17:13	17:15	390	1
TGN	Talegaon	11:38	11:40	158	1	16:41	16:43	361	1
CCH	Chinchwad	11:58	12:00	176	1	16:13	16:15	343	1
SVJR	Shivaji Nagar	12:18	12:20	190	1	15:51	15:53	329	1
PUNE	Pune Junction	12:40	12:45	192	1	15:40	15:45	327	1
GPR	Ghorpuri	12:50	12:52	194	1	15:08	15:10	324	1
JJR	Jejuri	13:48	13:50	250	1	14:06	14:08	269	1
NIRA	Nira	14:20	14:22	277	1	13:25	13:30	242	1
LNN	Lonand	14:30	14:32	284	1	13:08	13:10	234	1
WTR	Wathar	15:10	15:12	311	1	12:33	12:35	207	1
STR	Satara	15:57	16:00	337	1	12:00	12:03	181	1
KRG	Koregaon	16:12	16:14	348	1	11:41	11:43	171	1
RMP	Rahimatpur	16:24	16:26	358	1	11:28	11:30	160	1
TAZ	Targaon	16:38	16:40	369	1	11:13	11:15	149	1
MSR	Masur	16:52	16:54	382	1	11:28	11:30	160	1
KRD	Karad	17:21	17:23	396	1	10:43	10:45	123	1
TKR	Takari	17:52	17:54	422	1	10:14	10:16	96	1
KOV	Kirloskarwadi	18:08	18:10	431	1	10:03	10:05	88	1
BVQ	Bhilawadi	18:23	18:25	444	1	09:46	09:48	74	1
SLI	Sangli	18:42	18:45	464	1	09:27	09:30	55	1
MRJ	Miraj	19:05	19:10	471	1	09:07	09:10	48	1
JSP	Jaysingpur	19:21	19:23	483	1	08:43	08:45	36	1
HTK	Hatkanangale	19:40	19:42	498	1	08:25	08:27	21	1
RKD	Rukadi	19:50	19:52	505	1	08:15	08:17	14	1
VV	Valivade	19:58	20:00	512	1	08:05	08:07	7	1
KOP	Kolhapur SCSMT	20:25	Destination	518	1	Source	07:55	0	1

== See also ==
- Mahalaxmi Express
- Sahyadri Express
