= Begumpet railway station =

Railway station in Secunderabad, Telangana, India

Begumpet Railway Station
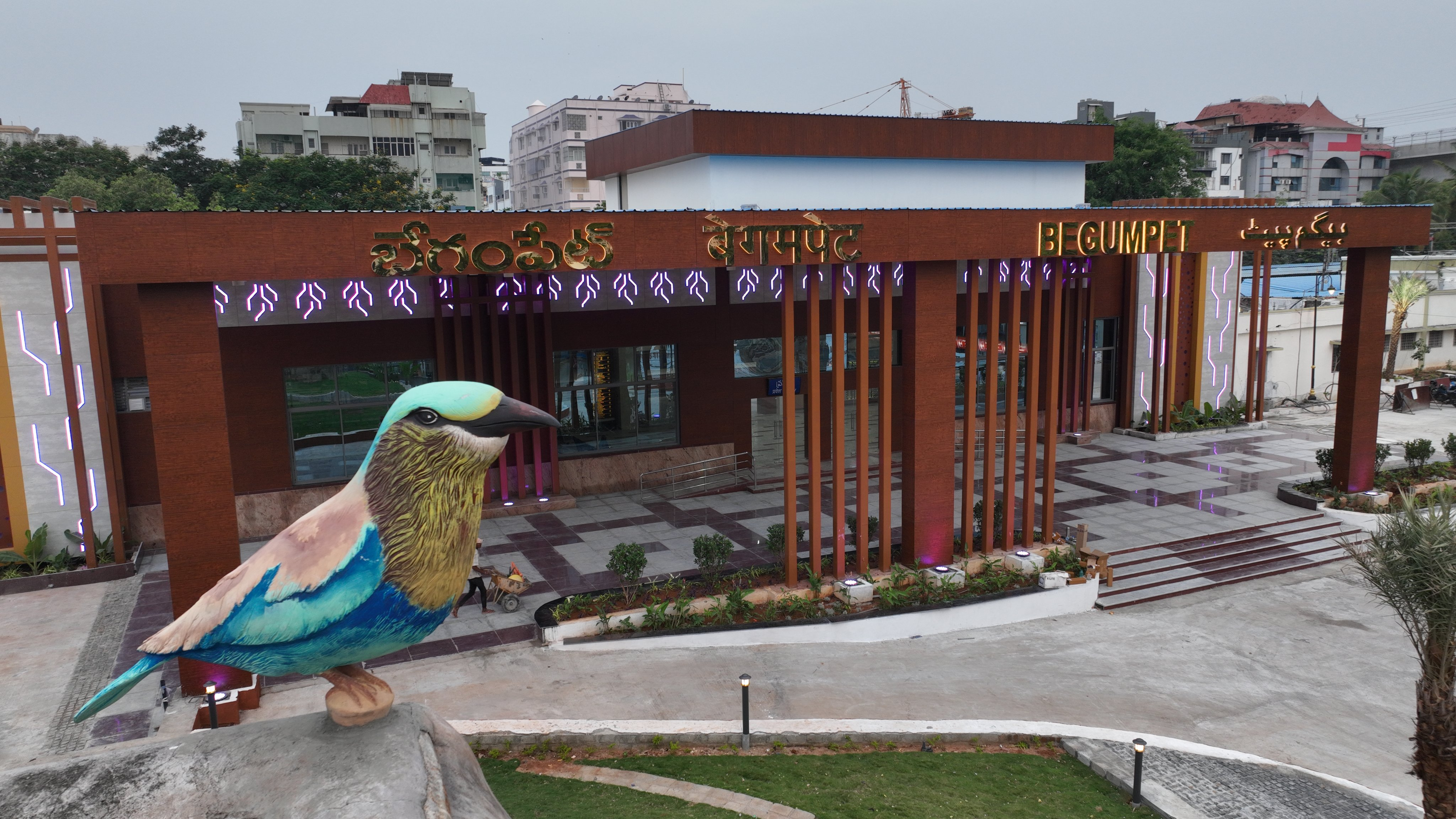
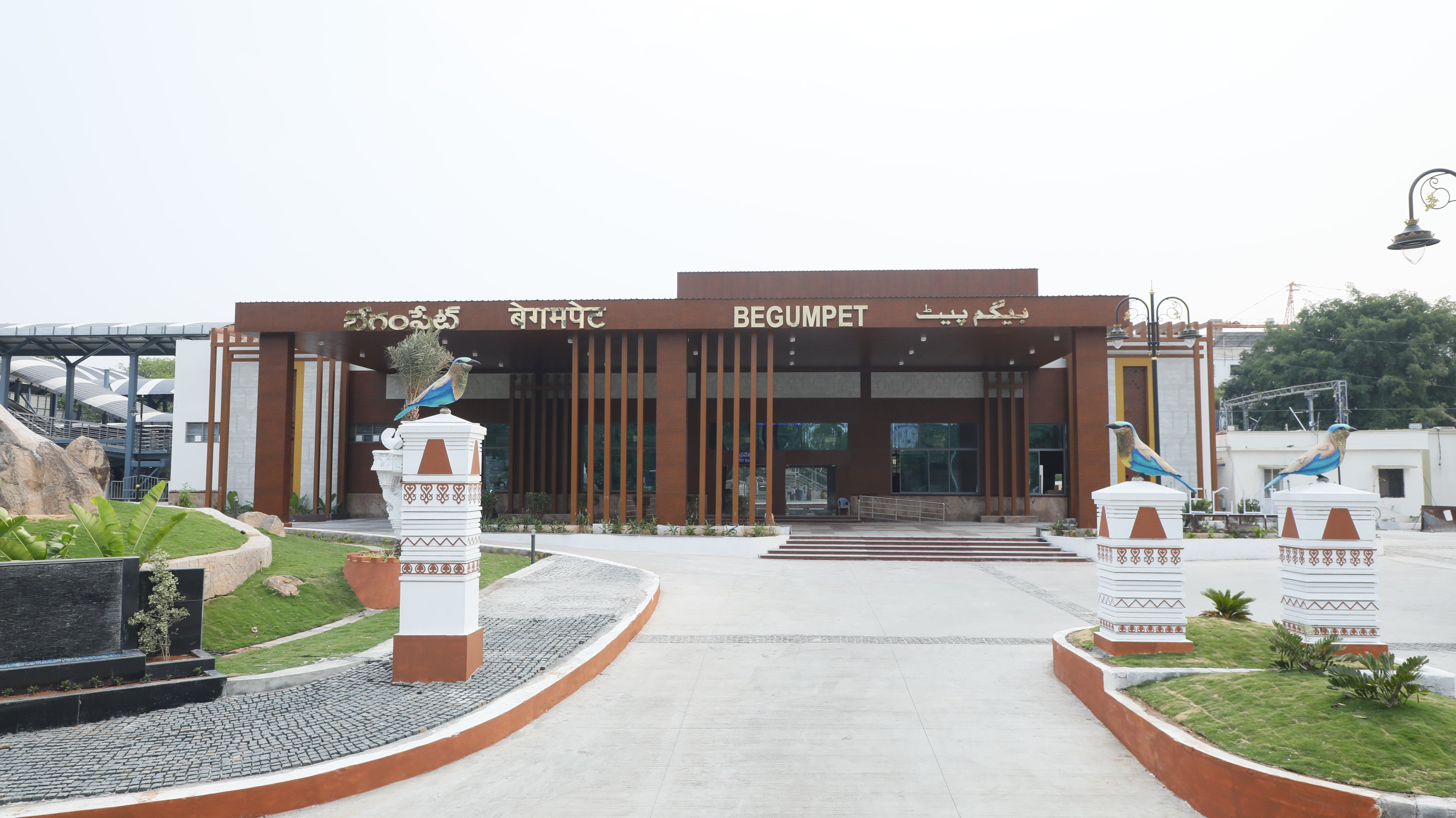
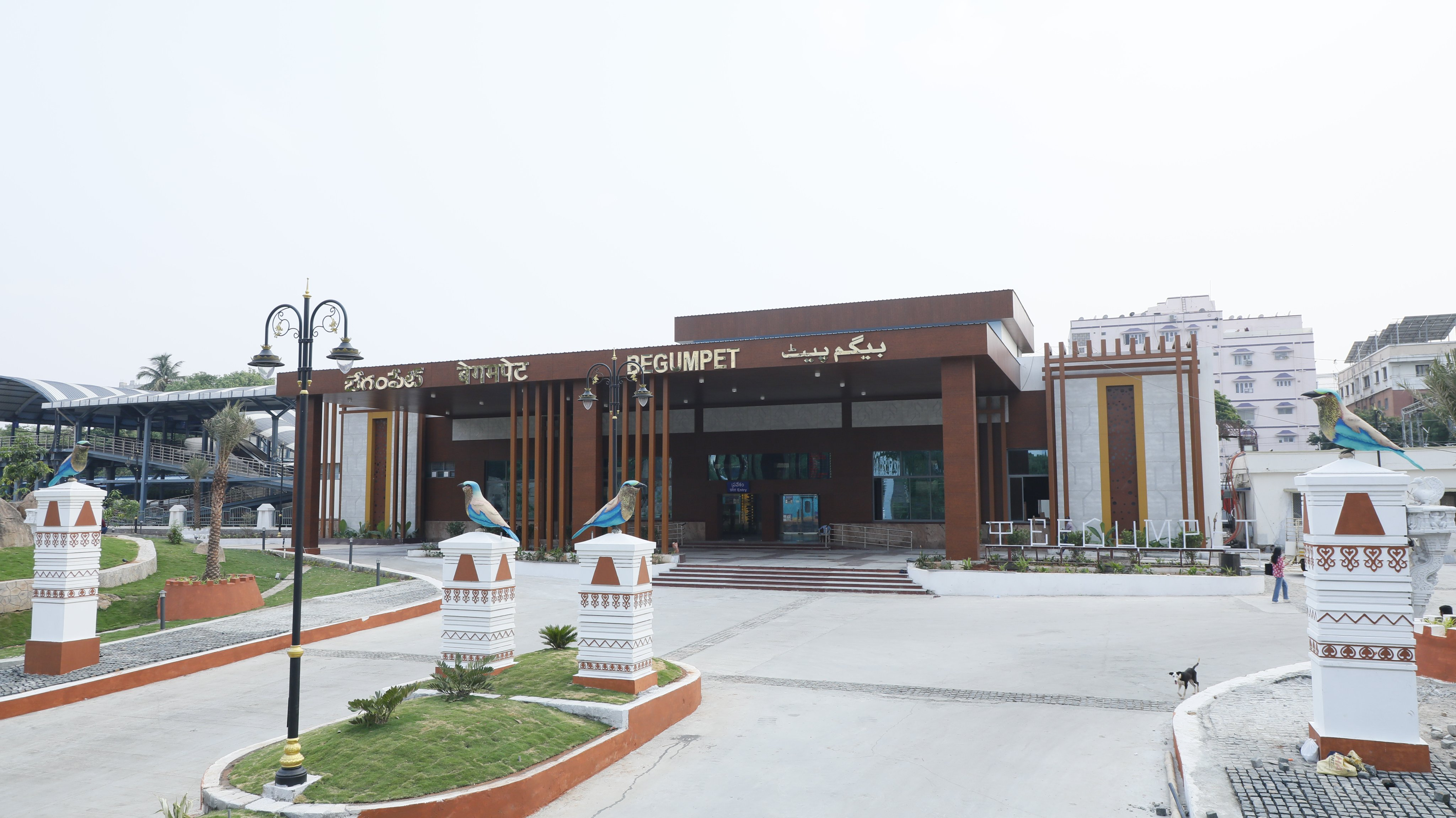

General information
- Location: Begumpet; Hyderabad; India
- Coordinates: 17.43871°N 78.458594°E
- Elevation: 531 m (1,742 ft)
- System: Indian Railways and Hyderabad MMTS station
- Owner: Indian Railways
- Operator: South Central Railway
- Platforms: 2
- Tracks: 2
- Connections: Blue Line Begumpet

Construction
- Structure type: At grade

Other information
- Status: Functioning
- Station code: BMT
- Zone(s): South Central Railway
- Division(s): Secunderabad

Passengers
- 15,000 (per day)
Location
- Location within Hyderabad Location within Telangana Location within India

Begumpet railway station (station code: BMT) is a grade-4 non-suburban (NSG–4) category Indian railway station in Secunderabad railway division of South Central Railway zone. It serves Begumpet, a neighbourhood of Hyderabad and has achieved a unique landmark of fully women employees operated railway station. It was selected as one of the 21 stations to be developed under Amrit Bharat Stations scheme.

== Redevelopment ==
Begumpet railway station underwent significant redevelopment under the Amrit Bharat Station Scheme, with an estimated investment of ₹26.55 crore. The project aimed to modernize the station while incorporating elements of Telangana's cultural heritage.

The upgraded station features several passenger amenities, including escalators, lifts, spacious waiting halls, modern sanitation facilities, and infrastructure designed to support disabled commuters. A symbolic installation of the Indian Roller, the state bird of Telangana, serves as a cultural centerpiece within the premises.

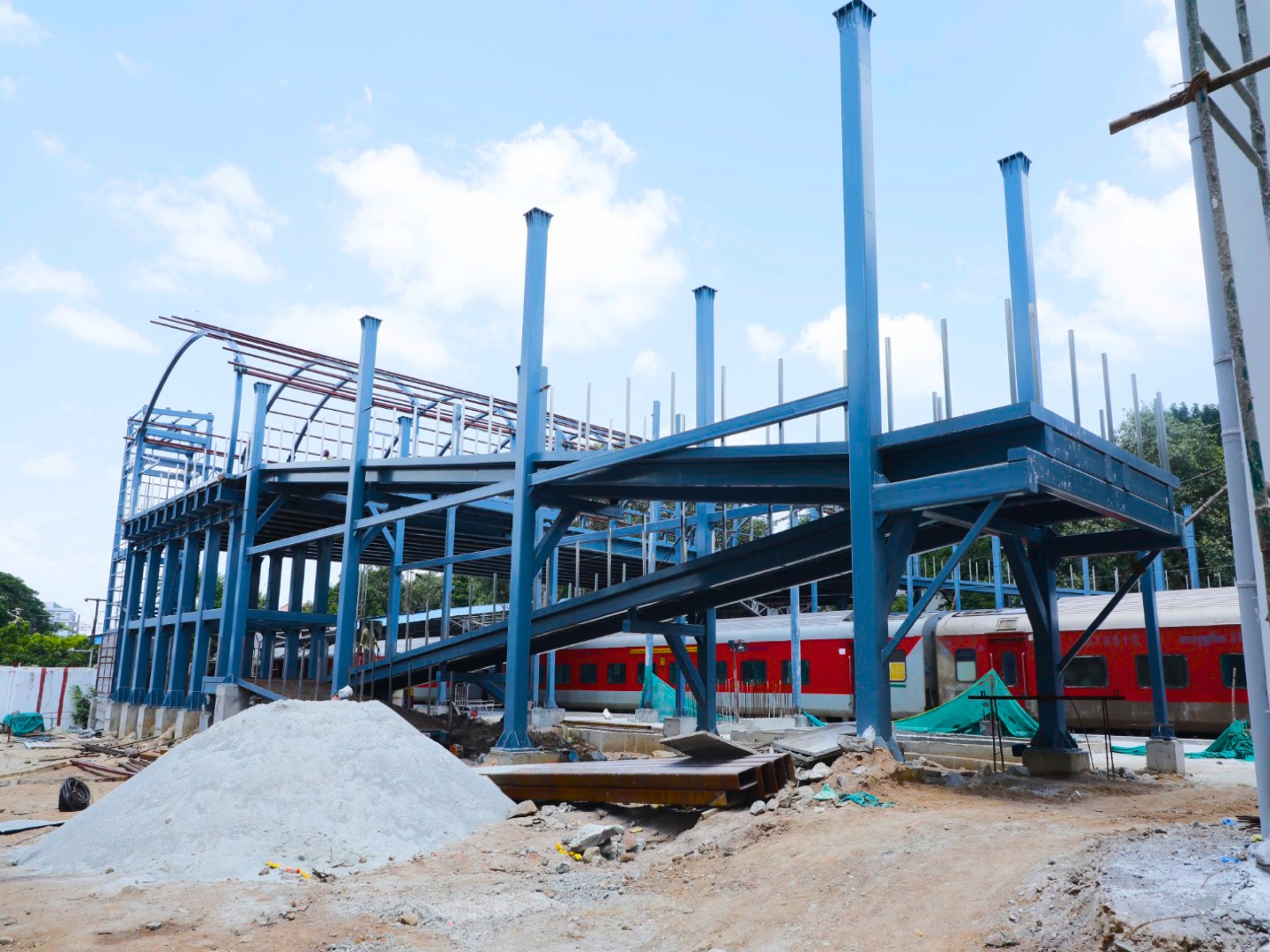
Foot Over Bridge Under Construction

According to South Central Railway (SCR) officials, enhancements also include improved lighting systems, landscaped green areas, water features, and clearly marked signage to facilitate commuter navigation. The station is staffed entirely by women, encompassing roles such as station master, ticketing personnel, Railway Protection Force (RPF) constables, and booking clerks. A dedicated surveillance system has been implemented to bolster safety measures, particularly for female passengers.

On 22 May 2025 Prime Minister Narendra Modi has virtually inaugurated the redeveloped Begumpet railway station

== Lines ==
- Hyderabad Multi-Modal Transport System
- Lingampalli–Hyderabad route (MMTS, Hyderabad)
- Falaknuma–Lingampalli route (MMTS, Hyderabad) via Secunderabad (FS line)

== Superfast trains with stops ==
- 17256/55 Lingampalli-Narasapur Express
- 22372/31 Hyderabad-Mumbai CST SF EXPRESS
- 12025/26 Pune–Secunderabad Shatabdi Express
- 12591/92 Gorakhpur–Yesvantpur Express
- 12701/02 Hyderabad–Mumbai CST Hussainsagar Express
- 12735/36 Secunderabad–Yesvantpur Garib Rath Express
- 12747/48 Palnadu Express
- 12737/38 Lingampally–Kakinada Port Gowthami Express
- 12793/94 Tirupati–Nizamabad Rayalaseema Express
- 12775/76 Lingampally-Kakinada Town Cocanada AC Express

== Express trains with stops ==
- 11019/20 Bhubaneswar–Mumbai CST Konark Express
- 11303/04 Manuguru–CSMT Kolhapur Express
- 17001/02 Sainagar Shirdi–Secunderabad Express
- 17009/10 Bidar–Hyderabad Intercity Express
- 17013/14 Hyderabad–Pune Express
- 17017/18 Rajkot–Secunderabad Express
- 17205/06 Sainagar Shirdi–Kakinada Port Express
- 17207/08 Sainagar Shirdi–Vijayawada Express
- 19201/02 Secunderabad–Porbandar Weekly Express

== Passenger trains with stops ==
- 57129/30 Hyderabad–Bijapur-Bolarum Passenger
- 57155/56 Hyderabad–Gulbarga Passenger
- 57517/18 Hyderabad–Tandur Passenger
- 57547/48 Hyderabad–Purna Passenger
- 57549/50 Hyderabad–Aurangabad Passenger
- 57605/06 Secunderabad–Vikarabad passenger
- 57659/60 Falaknuma–Solapur/Gulbarga passenger

== Trains passing through without stops ==
- 22691/92 Bangalore–Hazrat Nizamuddin Rajdhani Express
- 12213/14 Yeswantpur–Delhi Sarai Rohilla Duronto Express
- 12219/20 Secunderabad–Lokmanya Tilak Terminus Duronto Express
- 15015/16 Gorakhpur–Yesvantpur Express
- 12731/32 Secunderabad–Tirupati Superfast Express
- 17203/04 Kakinada–Bhavnagar Express
- 18519/20 Visakhapatnam–Lokmanya Tilak Terminus Express
- 22881/82 Pune–Bhubaneswar Superfast Express

== Gallery ==
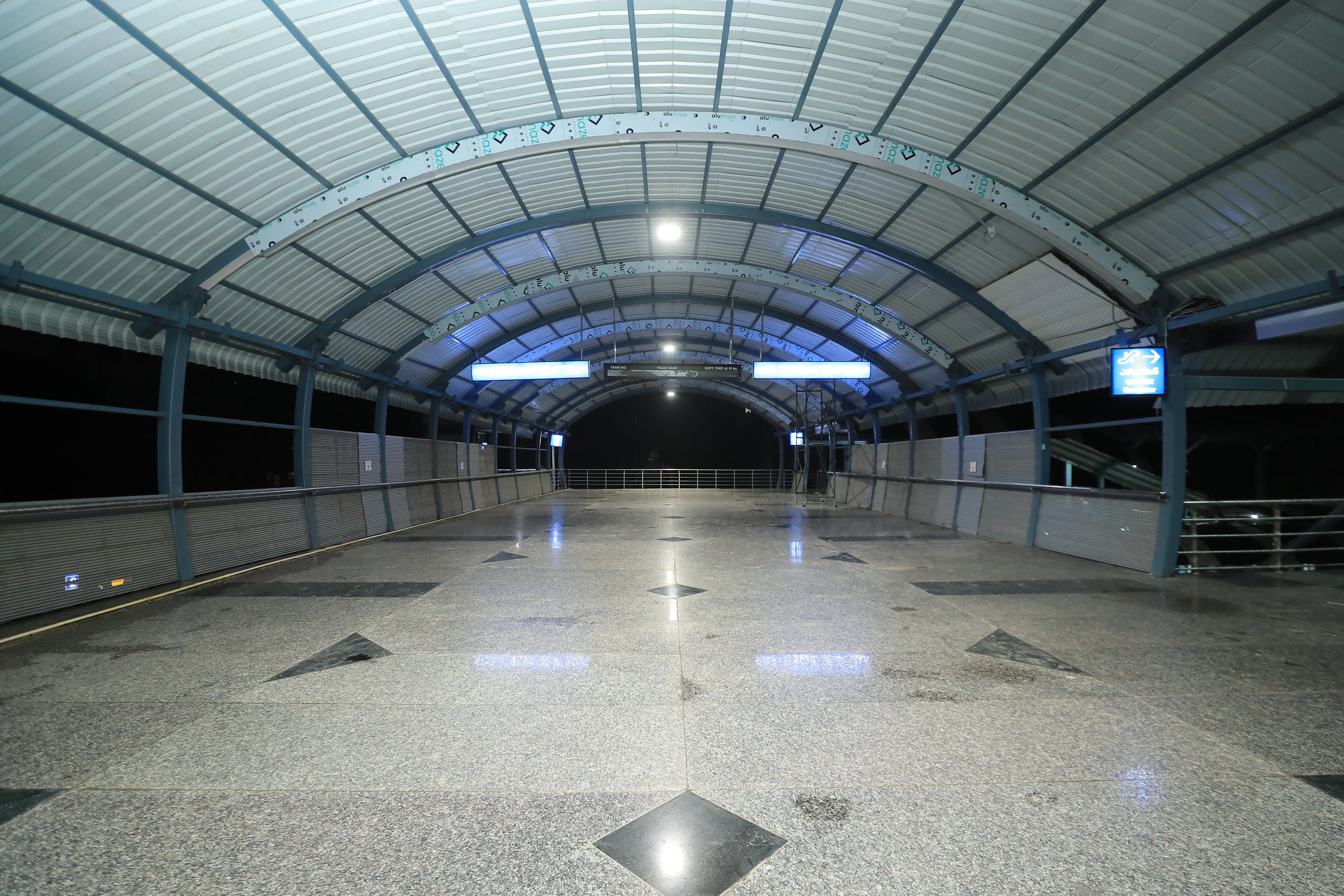

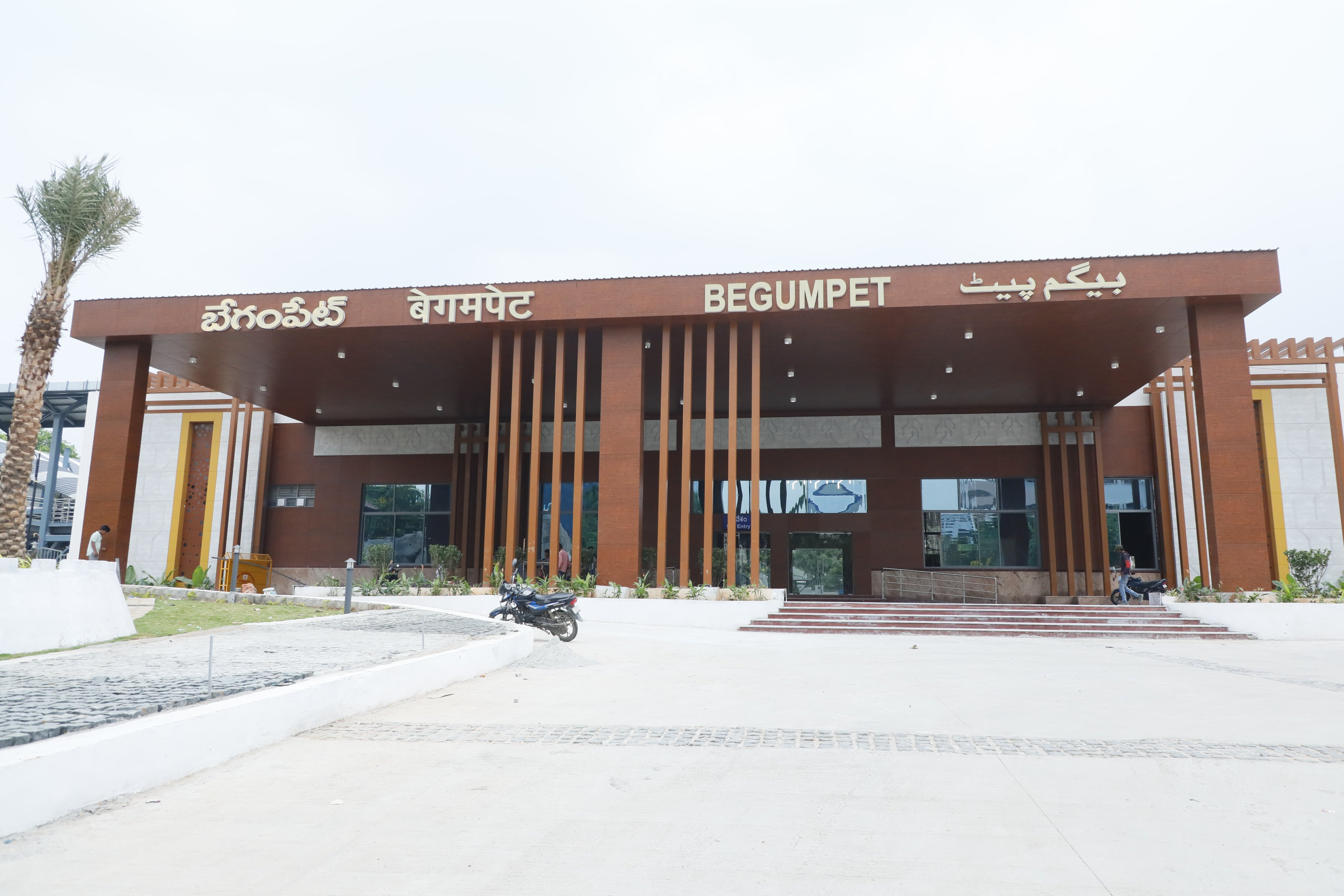

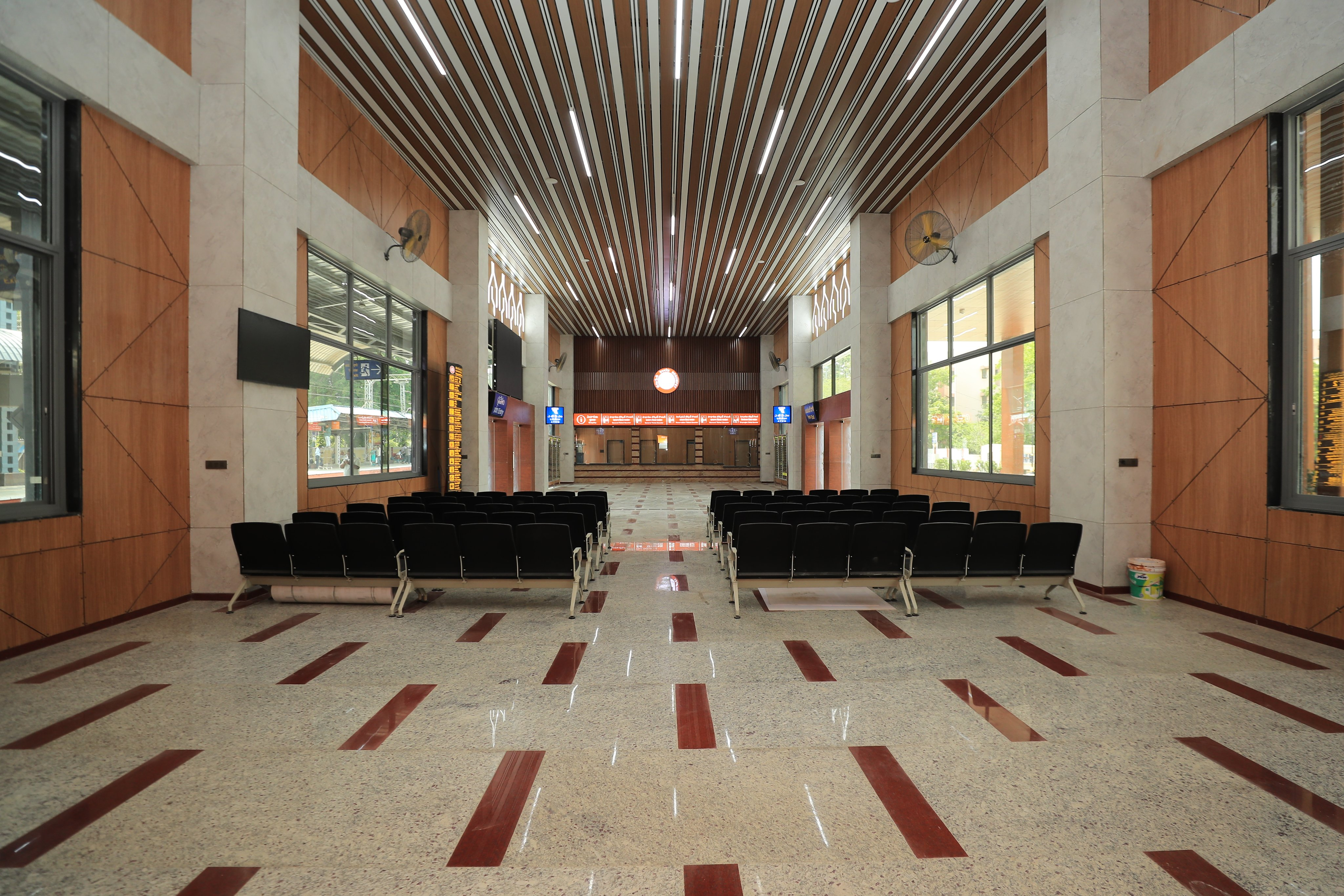

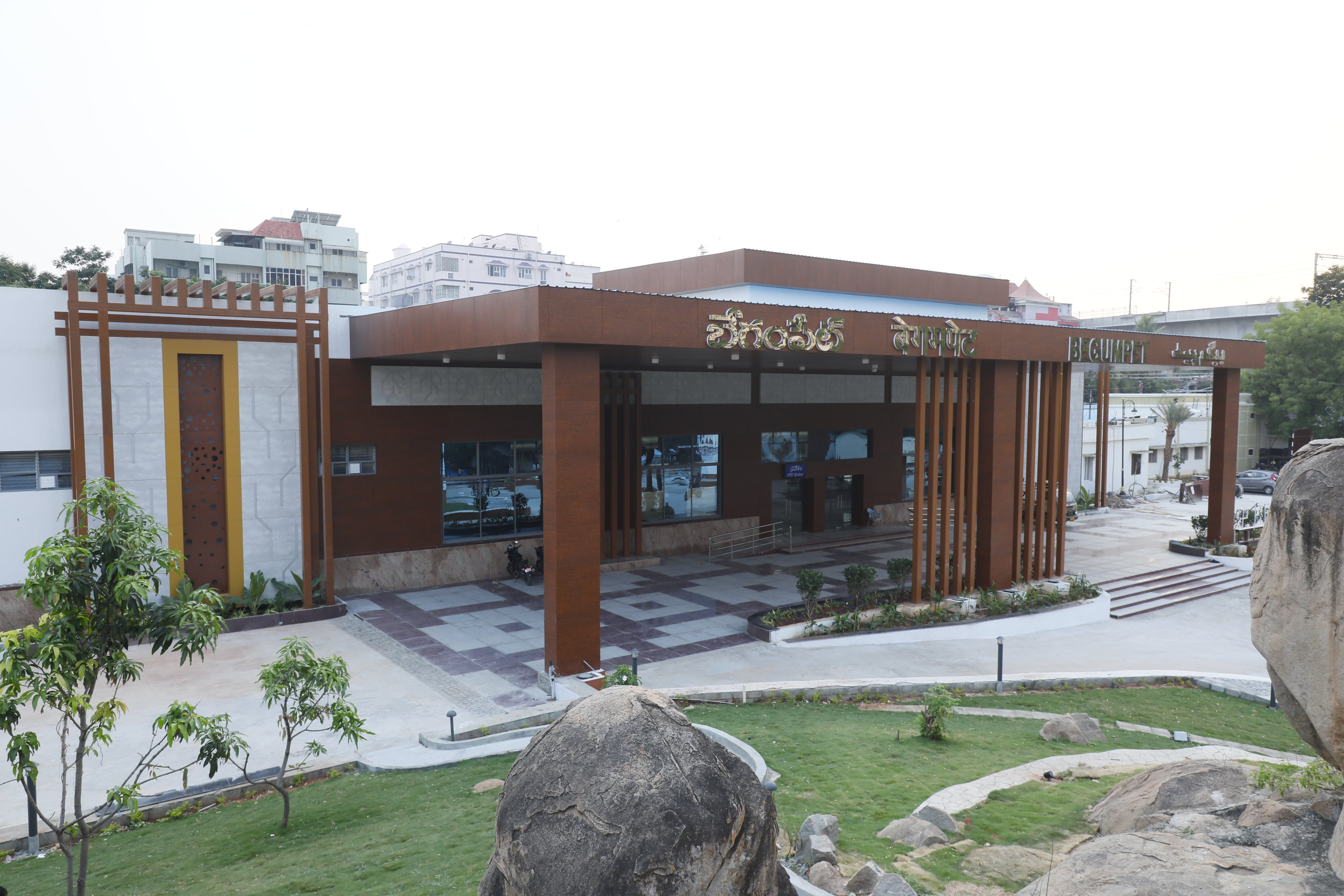

== See also ==
- Nizam's Guaranteed State Railway
