= Sahyadri Express =

Train in India

Mumbai CSMT (CSTM) - Kolhapur SCSMT (KOP) Sahyadri Express
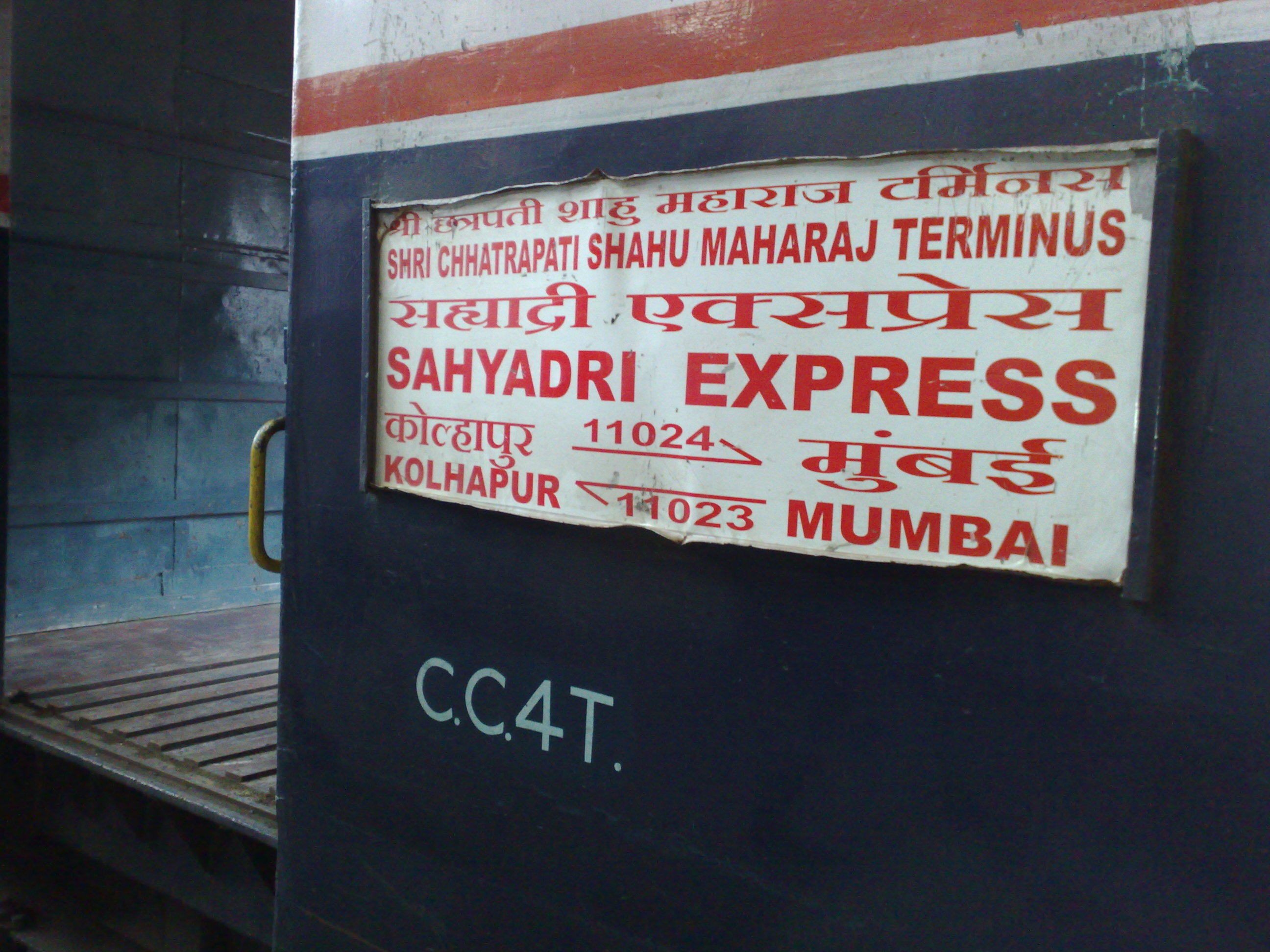

Overview
- Service type: Express
- Locale: Maharashtra
- Current operator: Central Railways

Route
- Termini: Mumbai CSMT (CSTM); Kolhapur SCSMT (KOP)
- Stops: 28 as 11023 Sahyadri Express, 31 as 11024 Sahyadri Express
- Distance travelled: 518 km (322 mi)
- Average journey time: 12 hours 15 minutes as 11023 Sahyadri Express, 13 hours 05 minutes as 11024 Sahyadri Express
- Service frequency: Daily
- Train number: 11023 / 11024

On-board services
- Classes: AC 2 tier, AC 3 tier, Sleeper Class, General Unreserved
- Seating arrangements: Yes
- Sleeping arrangements: Yes
- Catering facilities: On-board catering
- Observation facilities: Rake sharing with 11039/11040 Maharashtra Express
- Other facilities: Below the seats

Technical
- Rolling stock: ICF coach
- Track gauge: 1,676 mm (5 ft 6 in)
- Operating speed: 110 km/h (68 mph) maximum, 42 km/h (26 mph) average including halts
Route map
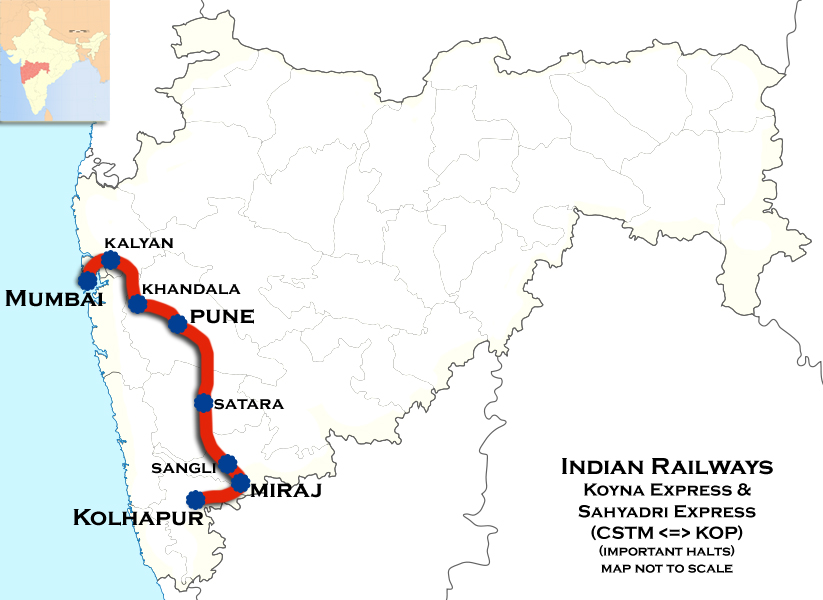

Named after the famous Sahyadri mountain range that forms part of the Western Ghats in Maharashtra, 11023 / 11024 Sahyadri Express was one of 3 daily dedicated express trains managed by Indian Railways, that ply between Mumbai and Kolhapur in India. The other two daily trains on the Mumbai and Kolhapur run are 11029/30 Koyna Express & 17411/12 Mahalaxmi Express.

It operated as train number 11023 from Mumbai CSMT to Kolhapur SCSMT and as train number 11024 in the reverse direction. Currently, Sahyadri Express is not in operation.

== Coaches ==
The 11023/11024 Sahyadri Express presently has one AC 2 tier, one AC 3 tier, eight Sleeper class and five General unreserved coaches. As with most train services in India, coach composition may be amended at the discretion of Indian Railways depending on demand.

== Service ==
The 11023 Sahyadri Express covers the distance of 518 kilometres in 12 hours 15 mins (42.29 km/h) & 13 hours 05 mins as 11024 Sahyadri Express (39.59 km/h).

As its average speed in both directions is below 55 km/h as per Indian Railways rules, it does not have a Superfast surcharge.

== Traction ==
A Kalyan-based dual traction WCAM-2 / WCAM-3 locos hauls the train from Mumbai CSMT until Pune Junction after which a Pune-based WDM-3A / WDM-3D takes over until Kolhapur SCSMT.

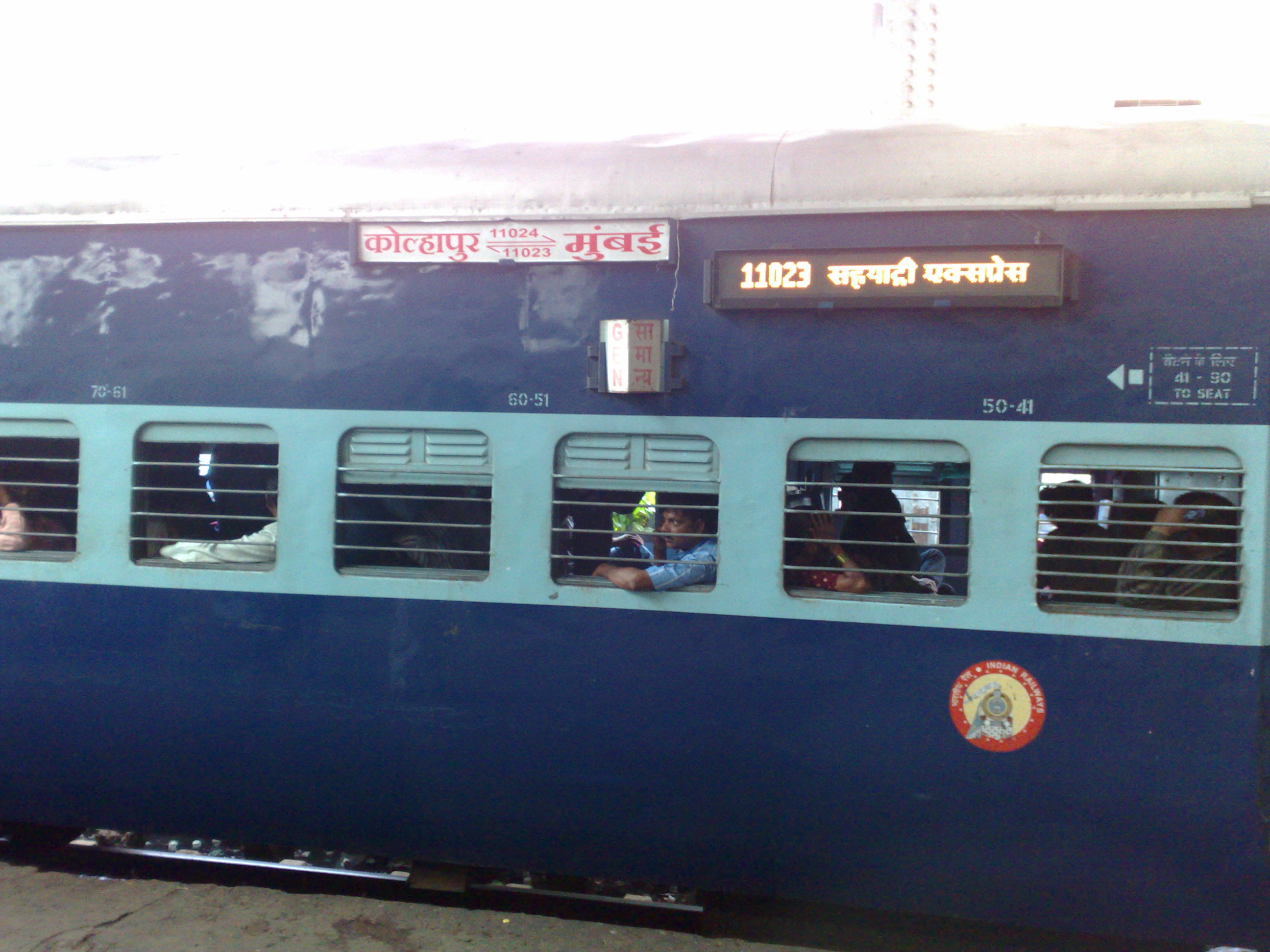
11023 Sahyadri Express – General coach

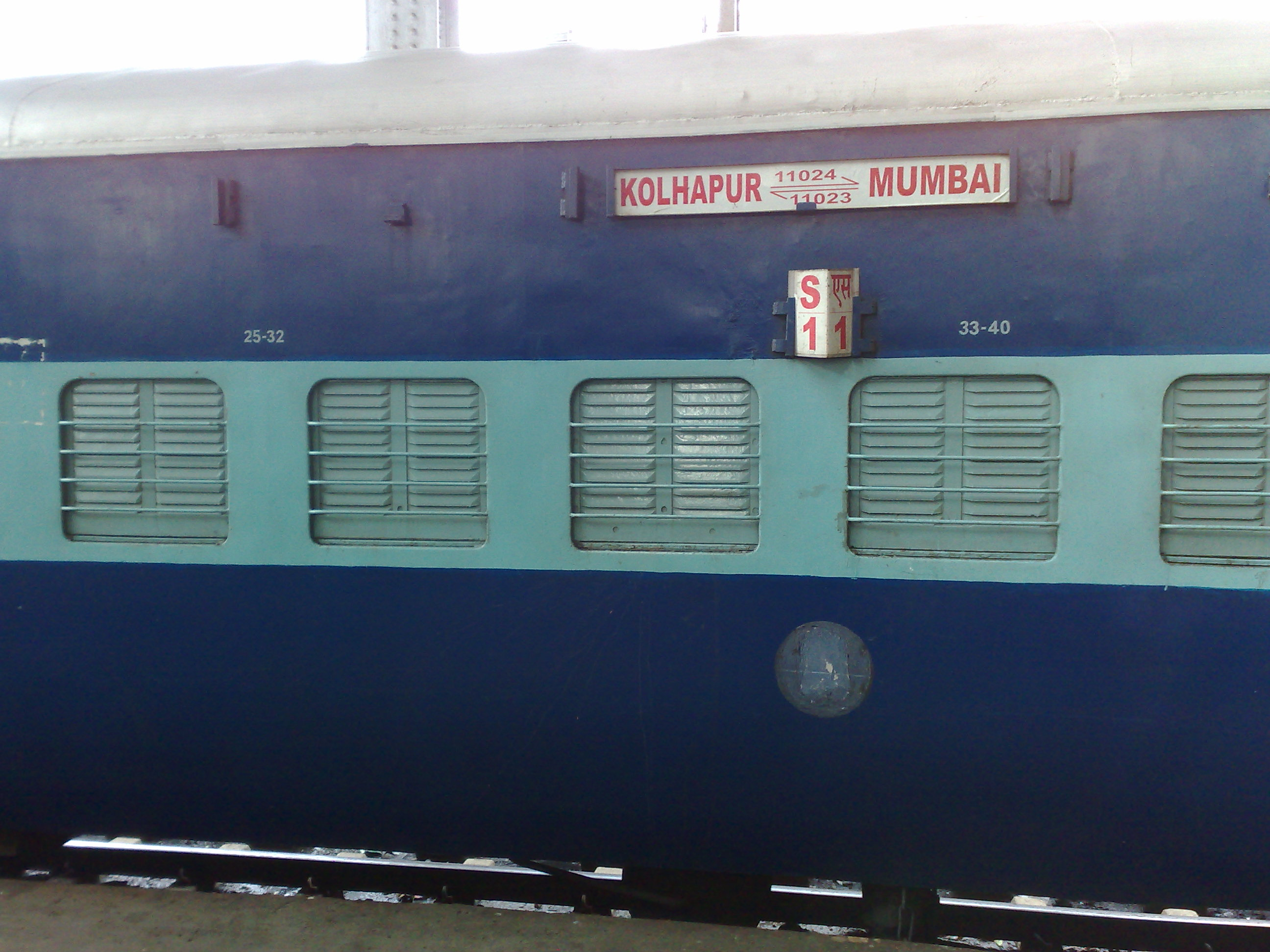
11023 Sahyadri Express – Sleeper coach

== Timetable ==
- 11023 Sahyadri Express leaves Mumbai CSMT every day at 17:50 hrs IST and reaches Kolhapur SCSMT at 06:05 hrs IST the next day.
- 11024 Sahyadri Express leaves Kolhapur SCSMT every day at 22:50 hrs IST and reaches Mumbai CSMT at 11:55 hrs IST the next day.

Station Code	Station Name	11023 – Mumbai CSMT to Kolhapur SCSMT		Distance from source in km	Day	11024 – Kolhapur SCSMT to Mumbai CSMT		Distance from source in km	Day
Station Code	Station Name	Arrival	Departure	Distance from source in km	Day	Arrival	Departure	Distance from source in km	Day
CSMT	Mumbai CSMT	Source	17:50	0	1	11:55	Destination	518	2
DR	Dadar	18:02	18:04	9	1	11:28	11:30	509	2
KYN	Kalyan Junction	18:48	18:50	54	1	10:35	10:40	465	2
KJT	Karjat	19:38	19:40	100	1	09:49	09:50	419	2
LNL	Lonavala	20:23	20:25	128	1	08:54	08:55	390	2
PUNE	Pune Junction	21:55	22:05	192	1	06:50	07:00	327	2
STR	Satara	01:37	01:40	337	2	02:23	02:26	181	2
KRD	Karad	02:53	02:55	396	2	01:23	01:25	123	2
MRJ	Miraj	04:40	04:43	471	2	00:02	00:05	48	2
KOP	Kolhapur SCSMT	06:05	Destination	518	2	Source	22:50	0	1

== See also ==
- Poona Mail
- Koyna Express
- Mahalaxmi Express
