= Haripriya Express =

Train in India

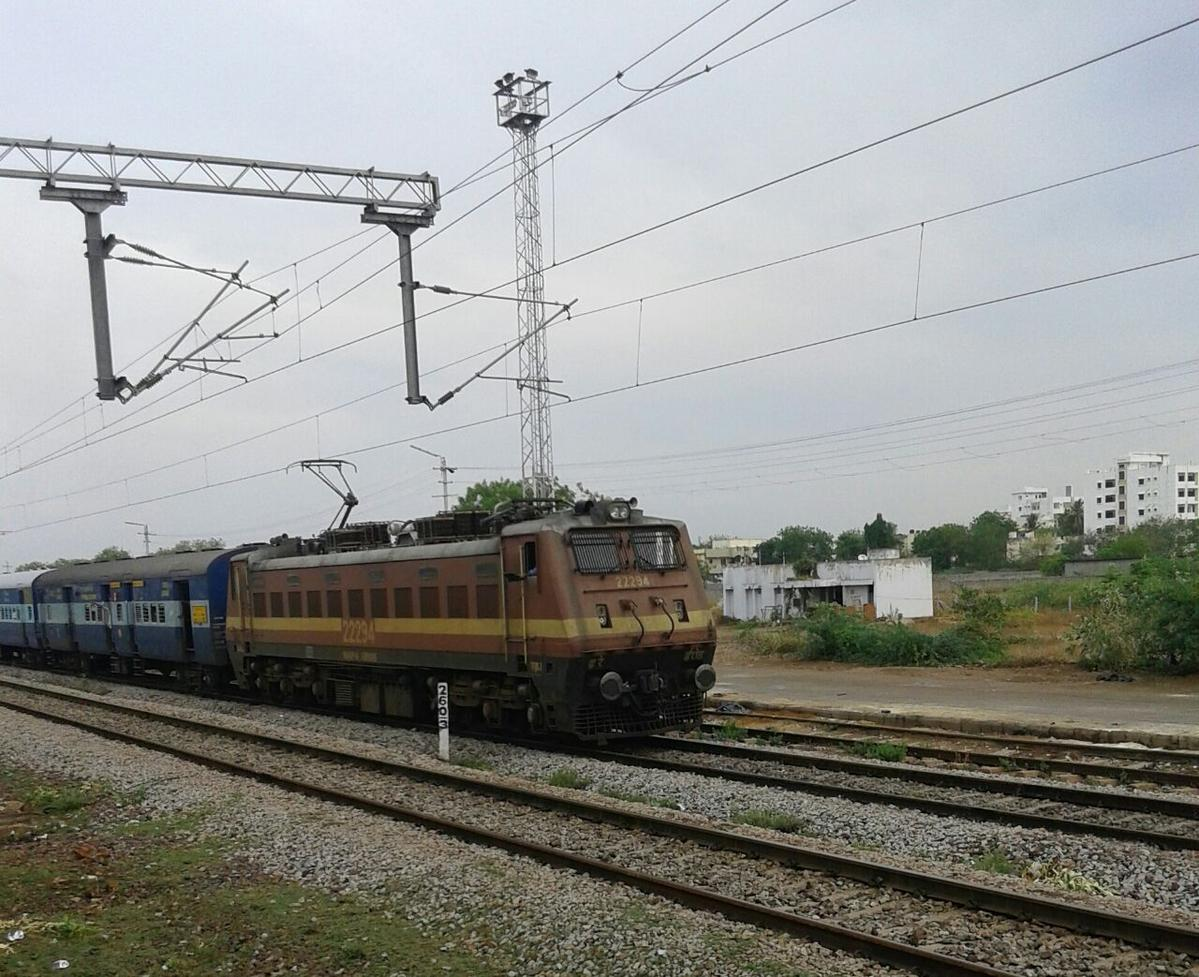
- Haripriya Express entering Cuddapah

Overview
- Service type: Express
- First service: 23 September 1998
- Current operator: South Coast Railways

Route
- Termini: Tirupati; Chhatrapati Shahu Maharaj Terminus
- Stops: 30
- Distance travelled: 905 km (562 mi)
- Average journey time: 19 hours 35 mins as 17415 Tirupati–Chattrapati Shahu Maharaj Terminus Haripriya Express, 21 hours 15 mins as 17416 Chattrapati Shahu Maharaj Terminus–Tirupati Haripriya Express
- Service frequency: Daily
- Train number: 17415 / 17416

On-board services
- Classes: AC First Class, AC 2 tier, AC 3 tier, Sleeper class, General Unreserved
- Seating arrangements: Yes
- Sleeping arrangements: Yes
- Catering facilities: No

Technical
- Rolling stock: LHB coaches
- Track gauge: 1,676 mm (5 ft 6 in)
- Operating speed: 110 km/h (68 mph) maximum 44.33 km/h (28 mph) including halts.
Route map
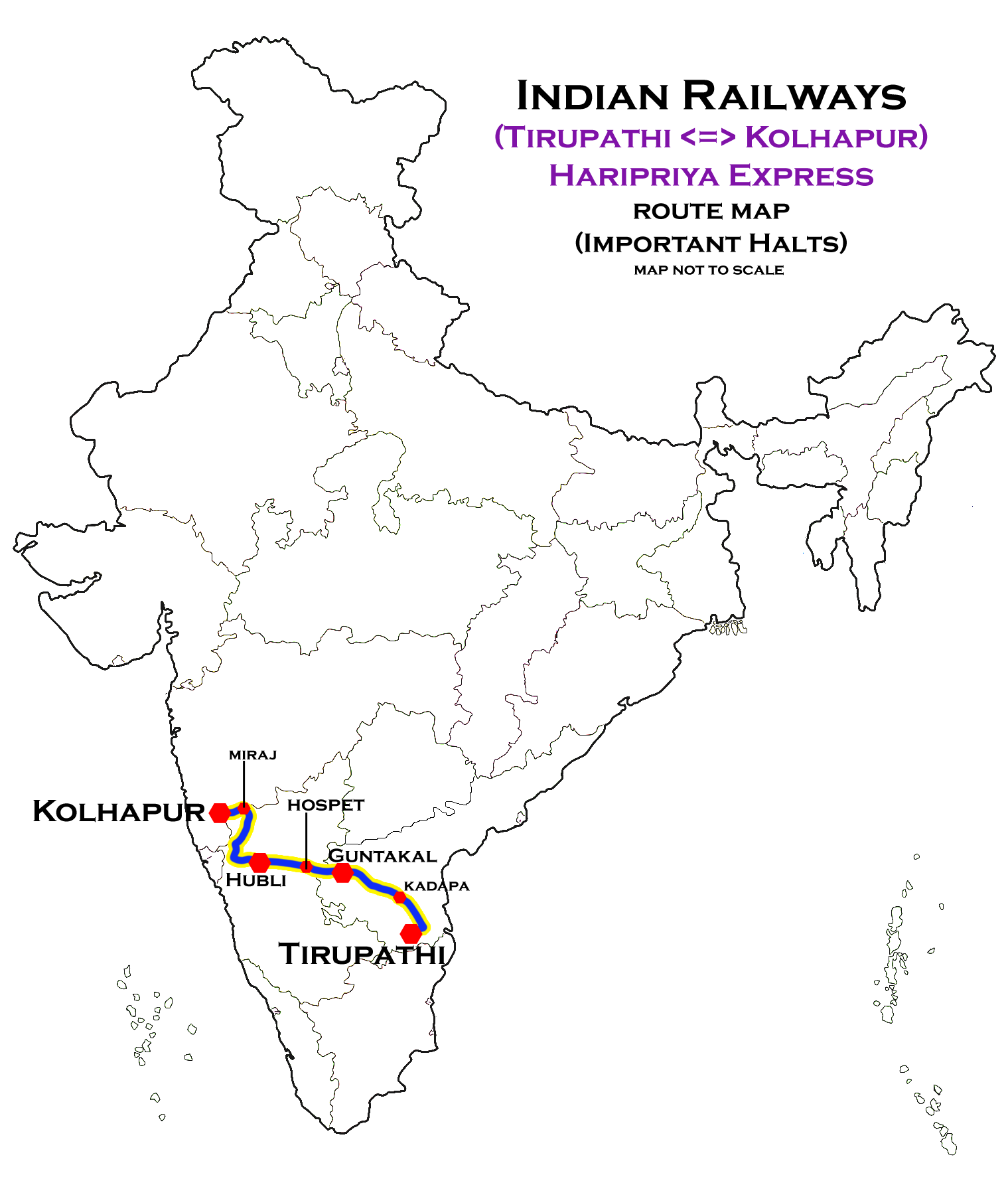

The 17415 / 16 Haripriya Express (also called Mahalaxmi Express) is an Express train belonging to South Coast Railway zone that runs between Tirupati and Chhatrapati Shahu Maharaj Terminus, Kolhapur in India.

It operates as train number 17415 from Tirupati to Shri Chhatrapati Shahu Maharaj Terminus and as train number 17416 in the reverse direction, serving the states of Andhra Pradesh, Karnataka and Maharashtra. It is named after goddess Mahalakshmi who resides in Kolhapur, and is the consort of Venkateswara who resides in Tirupati.

== Coaches ==
The 17415 / 16 Haripriya Express has 1 AC First Class, 2 AC 2 tier, 3 AC 3 tier economy, 9 Sleeper class, 4 General Unreserved and 1 SLR (Seating cum Luggage Rake) coaches. It does not carry a pantry car.

As is customary with most train services in India, coach composition may be amended at the discretion of Indian Railways depending on demand.

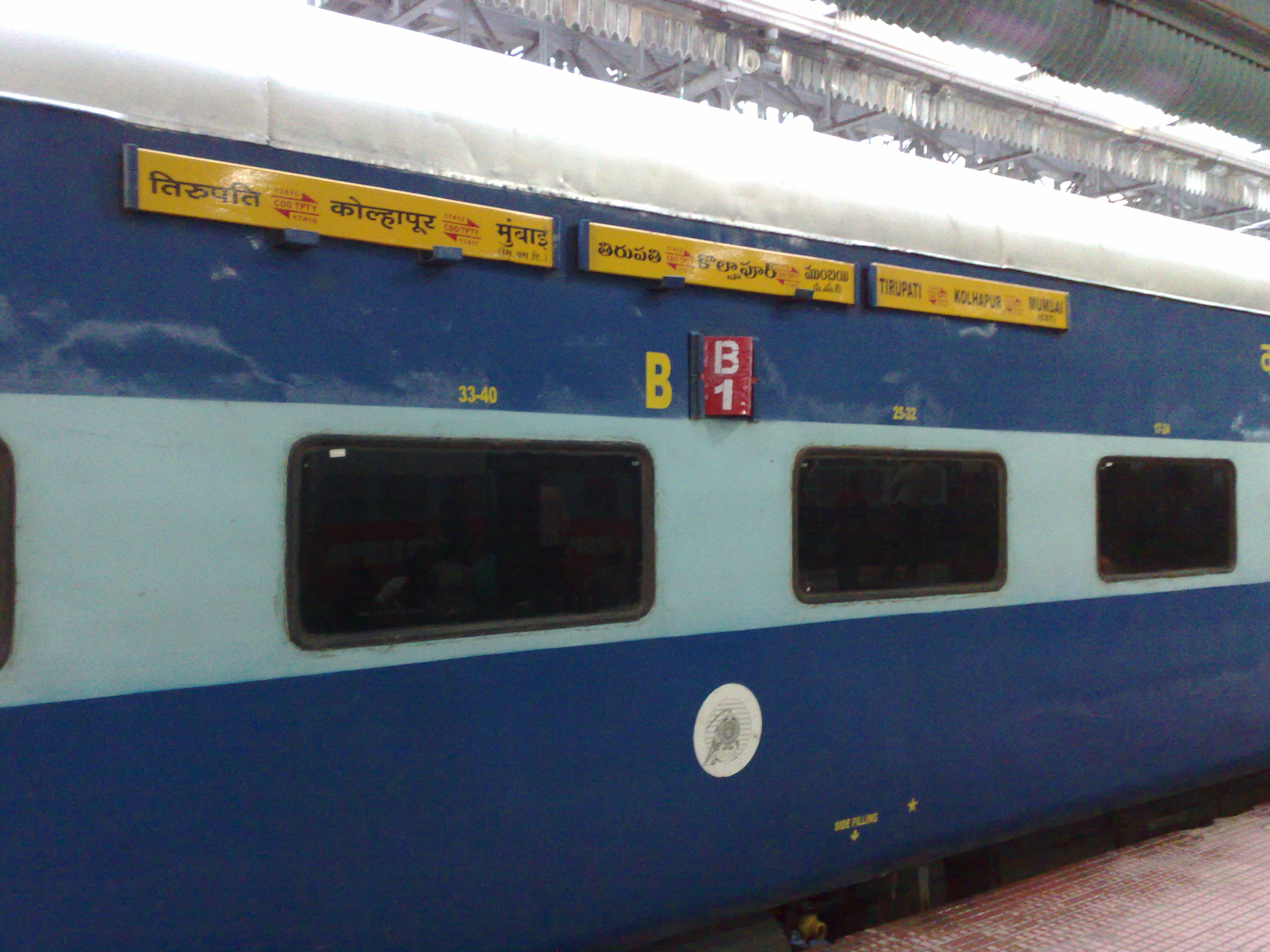
17415 Haripriya Express – AC 3 tier coach

== Service ==
The 17415 Haripriya Express covers the distance of 904 km (562 mi) in 19 hours 5 mins (47.57 km/h) from Tirupati to Shri Chhatrapati Shahu Maharaj Terminus and in 19 hours 40 mins as 17416 Haripriya Express (46.12 km/h) from Shri Chhatrapati Shahu Maharaj Terminus to Tirupati.

== Routeing ==
The 17415 / 16 Haripriya Express runs from Tirupati via Cuddapah, Gooty Junction, Guntakal Junction, Bellary Junction, Hosapete Junction, Gadag Junction, Hubli Junction, Dharwad, Londa Junction, Belagavi, Miraj Junction to Shri Chhatrapati Shahu Maharaj Terminus.

It reverses direction of travel at Miraj Junction.

== Traction ==
As the route is electrified, it is hauled by a Lallaguda-based WAP-7 from Tirupati to Shri Chhatrapati Shahu Maharaj Terminus and vice-versa.

== Rake sharing ==
It shares its rake with the 17411 / 12 Mahalaxmi Express.

== See also ==
- Dedicated Intercity trains of India
