= Mahalaxmi Express =

Train in India

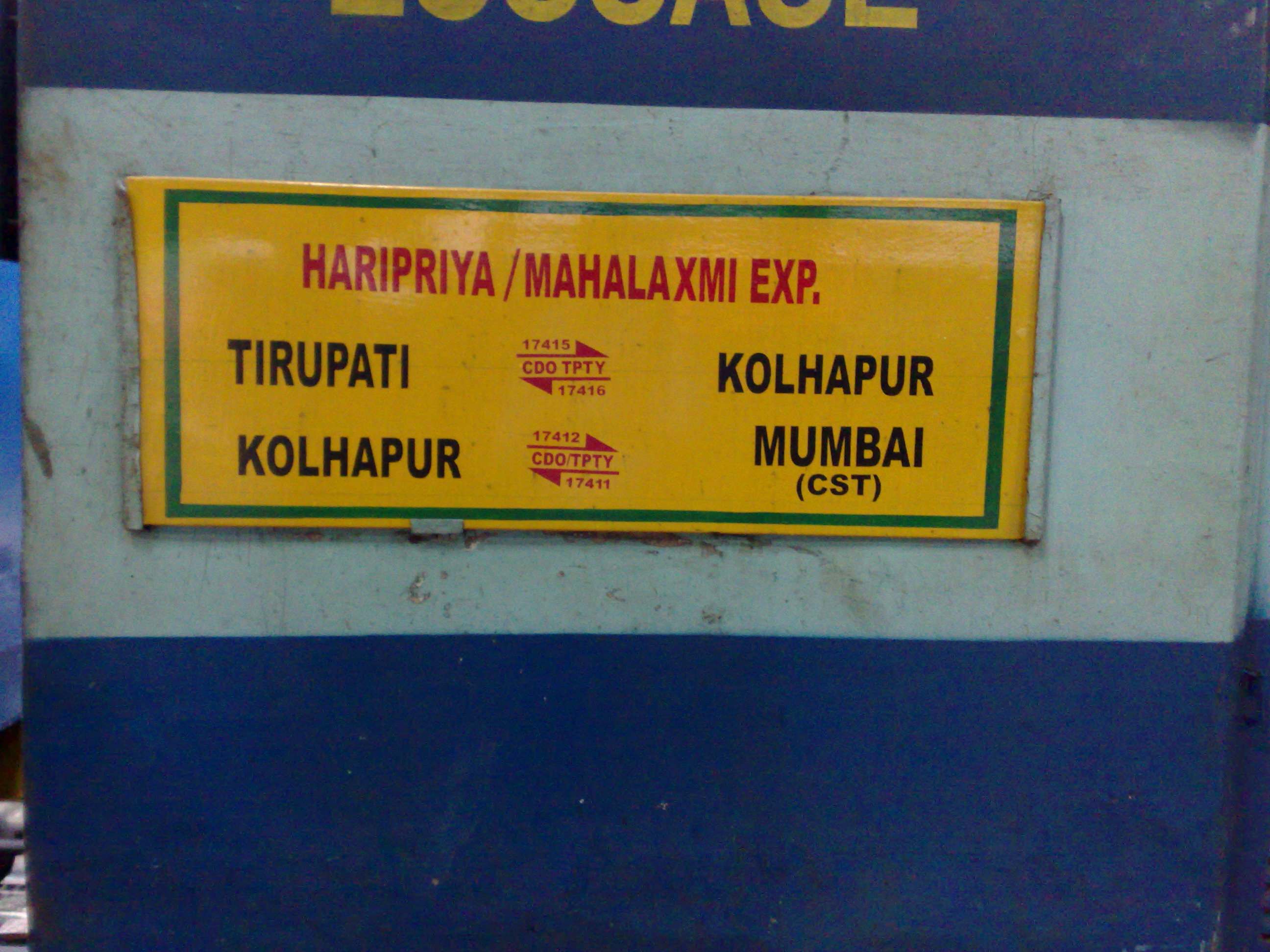

Overview
- Service type: Express
- Locale: Maharashtra
- Current operator: South Coast Railways

Route
- Termini: Mumbai CSMT; Kolhapur SCSMT
- Stops: 16 as 17411 Mahalaxmi Express, 17 as 17412 Mahalaxmi Express
- Distance travelled: 518 km (322 mi)
- Average journey time: 10 hours 57 minutes
- Service frequency: Daily
- Train number: 17411 / 17412

On-board services
- Classes: AC 1st Class, AC 2 tier, AC 3 tier, Sleeper Class, General Unreserved
- Seating arrangements: Yes
- Sleeping arrangements: Yes
- Catering facilities: No pantry car but available
- Observation facilities: Rake sharing with 17415/16 Haripriya Express

Technical
- Rolling stock: LHB coaches
- Track gauge: 1,676 mm (5 ft 6 in)
- Operating speed: 110 km/h (68 mph) maximum 47.38 km/h (29 mph), including halts
Route map
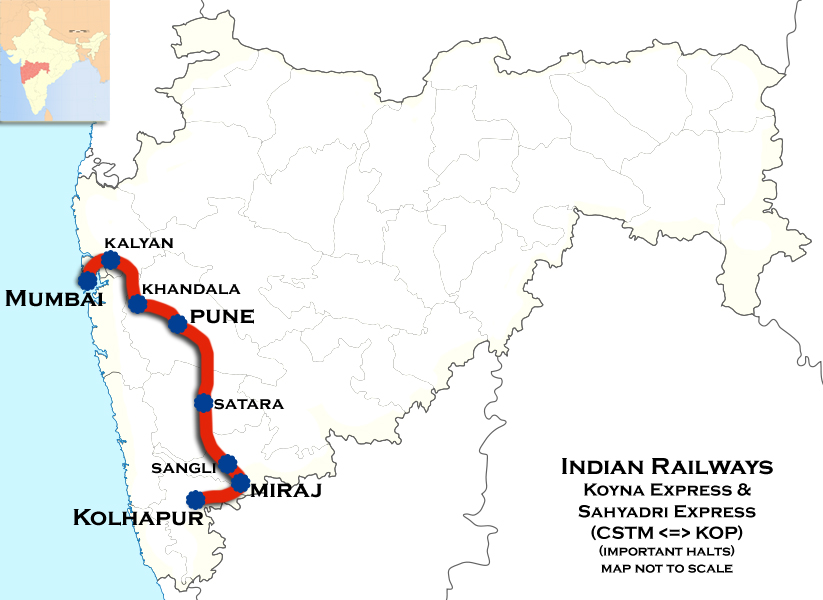

The 17411/17412 Mahalaxmi Express is an express train belonging to Indian Railways that runs between Mumbai and Kolhapur in India. It is a daily service. It operates as train number 17411 from Mumbai CSMT to Kolhapur SCSMT and as train number 17412 in the reverse direction. Before gauge conversion, this train ran in two sections, with Sectional Carriage interchanged at Pune & later at Miraj, with timeline

- Bombay-Pune (as 303 Mumbai–Pune Mail 1863–1971), Bombay-Miraj (as 303 Bombay Mail 1971–1974), Bombay-Kolhapur (as 303 Mahalaxmi Express since 1974)
- 902 Poona Mail (MG Service between Pune-Miraj & later Pune-Bangalore till 1974), 304 Bombay Mail (MG Service Miraj-Bangalore past 1971–73) & 304 Mahalaxmi Express (MG Service since 1974 till Miraj-Bangalore GC)

After gauge conversion, the Miraj–Bangalore train was discontinued and a new direct train between Kurla and Bangalore was introduced. It is named after Mahalakshmi temple in Kolhapur.

== Coaches ==
The 17411/7412 Mahalaxmi Express presently has 1 AC 1st Class, 2 AC 2 tier, 3 AC 3 tier economy, 9 Sleeper Class & 4 General Unreserved coaches. As with most train services in India, coach composition may be amended at the discretion of Indian Railways depending on demand.

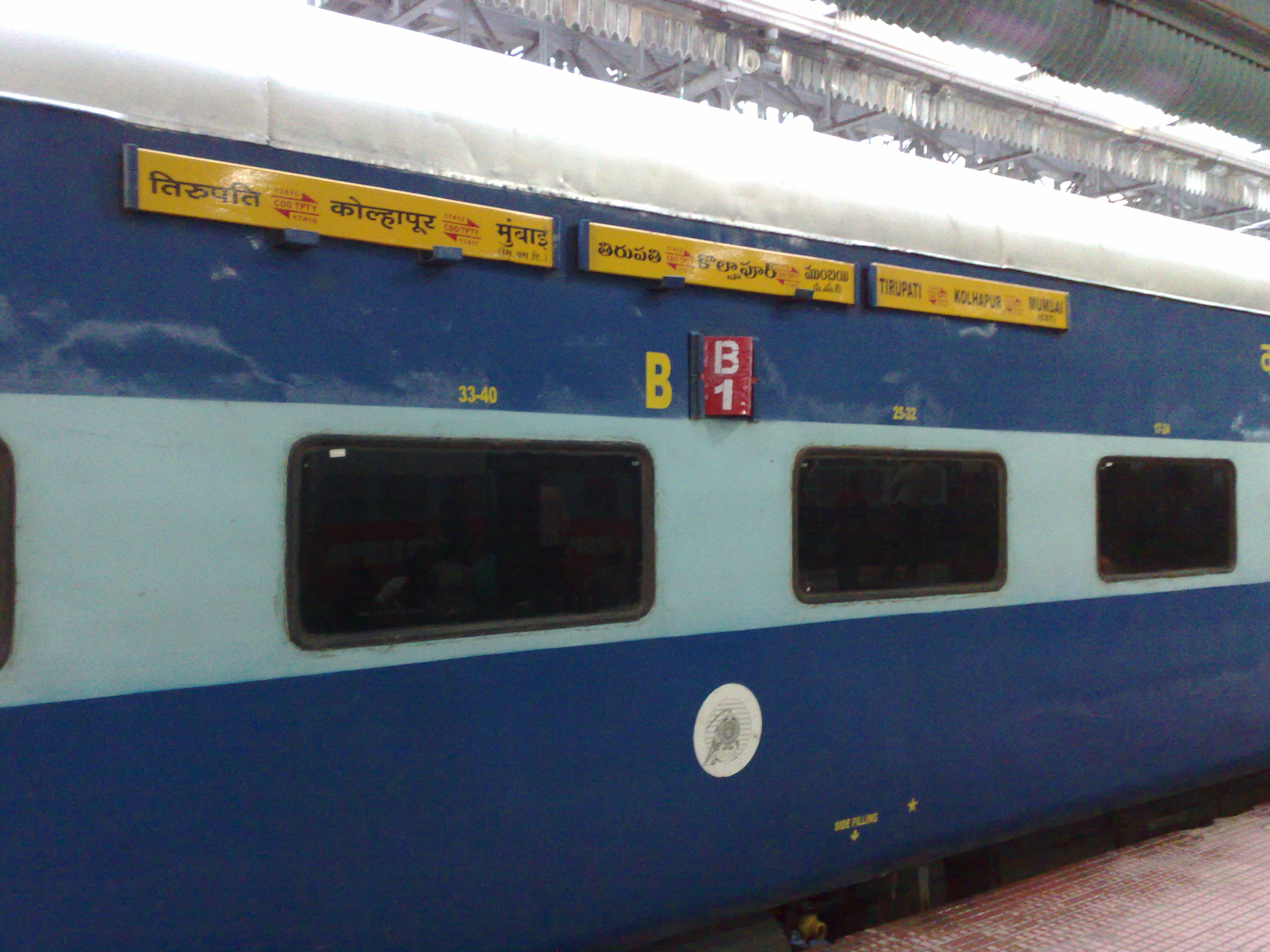
17411 Mahalaxmi Express – AC 3 tier coach

== Service ==
Mumbai CSMT (Chhatrapati Shivaji Maharaj Terminus) – Kolhapur SCSMT (Shri Chhatrapati Shahu Maharaj Terminus) Mahalaxmi Express was introduced in 1971. Passengers were transferred from slip coaches of Bengaluru Miraj Express to Mahalaxmi Express at Miraj Junction. After gauge conversion, Bengaluru–Miraj slip Express was discontinued and Kurla–Bengaluru Express was introduced.

Now 17411 Mahalaxmi Express covers the distance of 518 kilometres in 11 hours 05 mins (47.31 km/h) & 11 hours 05 mins as 17412 Mahalaxmi Express (47.45 km/h).

As its average speed in both directions is below 55 km/h as per Indian Railways rules, it does not have an Superfast surcharge.

== Traction ==
An AC-traction WAP-7 locomotive hauls the train from Mumbai CSMT to Chhatrapati Shahu Maharaj Terminus, Kolhapur. While in the past there was an interchange from electric to diesel, priot to that the traction was completely diesel run

== Incident ==
On 27 July 2019, 17411 Mahalaxmi Express was stuck between Badlapur Station & Vangani station for 12–15 hours after heavy rains & flooding from nearby Ulhas River. Approx 1050 passengers including 9 pregnant women were rescued by NDRF, Indian Navy, Indian Air Force, Maharashtra Police and local people of Vangani.

== See also ==
- Koyna Express
- Sahyadri Express
