= Tardal =

Village in Maharashtra

- Village
- Interactive map of Tardal
- Coordinates: 16.7436°N 74.4654°E
- Country: India
- State: Maharashtra
- District: Kolhapur
- PIN: 416121

Tardal is a village in Hatkanagale Taluka, Kolhapur district, Maharashtra, India.

== Demographics ==
According to the 2011 census (Village ID 567311) it has a population of 16445 living in 3565 households.
