= Peth Vadgaon =

- city
- Location in Maharashtra, India
- Coordinates: 16.50°N 74.19°E
- Country: India
- State: Maharashtra
- District: Kolhapur
- Elevation: 545.6 m (1,790 ft)

Population (2011)
  - Total: 25,651

Languages
  - Official: Marathi
- Time zone: UTC+5:30 (IST)
- PIN: 416112
- Telephone code: 0230
- Vehicle registration: MH-09

Peth Vadgaon is a city and education hub in Kolhapur district in the Indian state of Maharashtra. It is governed by a municipal council.

== Demographics ==
As of 2001 India census, Vadgaon Kasba had a population of 22,754. Males constitute 52% of the population and females 48%. Vadgaon Kasba has an average literacy rate of 73%, higher than the national average of 59.5%: male literacy is 78%, and female literacy is 67%. In Vadgaon Kasba, 12% of the population is under 6 years of age. Current population of Peth Vadgaon is above 30,000 as in 2020.

== History ==
Dhanaji Shambhusinha Jadhav (1650–1708), popularly known as Dhanaji Jadhav, was a warrior of the Maratha Empire. Along with Santaji Ghorpade he made terrifying campaigns against Mughal Army from 1689 to 1696. After Santaji, Dhanaji became the chief of the Maratha army in 1696 and remained on the post until his death in 1708. A monument of him stands in the town. Shri Sadguru Jivanmukt Swami Sanjiwan Samadhi math Bhajani galli: It is the oldest samadhi in Peth Vadgaon city. The math was established in 1826. It is one of the first namadev shimpi math. There is lake "Mahalaksmi Talav" near Mahalaxmi temple which is constructed by Shahu Maharaj. It is finely engineered to provide water for people in town. In city, there are 4 water tanks, which get filled automatically without any pumps or any other mechanism. Only by using gravity they achieved this feet.

== Educational institutes ==
Educational institutes in Pethvadgaon include:

- Vadgaon High School & Junior College, Peth Vadgaon
- Dr. Babasaheb Ambedkar College
- Shri Vijaysinh Yadav Arts & Science College
- Shri Balasaheb Mane Shikshan Prasarak Mandal's Group of Institution, Faculty of Management Studies, Vathar Tarfe Vadgaon
- Shri Balasaheb Mane Shikshan Prasarak Mandal, B.Ed. College
- Savitribai Phule Mahila Shikshanshastra Mahavidyalaya
- Holy Mother English Medium School
- Balasaheb Mane Shikshan Prasarak Mandal's Group of Institutions, Faculty of Engg., Wathar Tarfe Vadgaon
- Ashokrao Mane College of Pharmacy
- Ashokrao Mane Polytechnic, Vathar Tarf Vadgaon
- Shrimati Indira Gandhi Madhyamik Vidyalaya
- Smt. Sushiladevi Malharrao Desai Kanya Mahavidyalaya

Hanuman Shikshan Prasarak Mandal, Savarde's Ayurvedic Medical College

== Tourist attractions ==
- Dhanaji Jadhav Monument
- Mahalaxmi talav and mandir
- Ganesh mandir
- Mahadev mandir
- Nagnath mandir
- Shri Jewheshwar mandir (Swakul Sali Samaj)
- Shri Jivanmukta swami sanjiwan samadhi, bhajani galli ESTD:1660]] samadhi
- Historical Temple of Mahalaxmi (Kuranatil)
- Historical Mahalaxmi Lake (Build by Chatrapati Shahu Maharaj
- Nagaoba Wadi Temple
- Maa Saheb Sawari Masoodi Pir Temple

Tourisam Near Peth Vadgaon

- Gandharv Farms & Resorts near Chinmay Ganesh
- Chinmay Ganesh Statue (82 ft tall Statue)
- Bahuballi (Jain Temple and Statue)
- Dhuloba Mandir
- Ramling Mandir
- Allamprabhu Mandir
- Mahalaxmi Temple (Kolhapur) (Approx. 23 km from Vadgaon)
