= Hatkanangale =

- town
- Interactive map of Hatkanangale
- Coordinates: 16.7482492°N 74.417524°E
- Country: India
- State: Maharashtra
- District: Kolhapur

Population
  - Total: 25,569

Languages
  - Official: Marathi
- Time zone: UTC+5:30 (IST)
- Vehicle registration: MH-09
- Nearest city: Ichalkaranji
- Sex ratio: 4:1 ♂/♀

Hatkanangale is a town and tehsil headquarters in Ichalkaranji subdivision of Kolhapur district in the Indian state of Maharashtra.

Hatkanangale has a close proximity with Kolhapur, Ichalkaranji, Bhadole, and Sangli. It has a railway station on the Miraj-Kolhapur line and also has good road facility which connects it to the neighboring cities. In spite of all this and being a taluka, it is not as developed as to be called a city. It has many textile and small scale manufacturing factories. Many people travel to Ichalkaranji, Kolhapur and Sangli for work.

Water facility is good in the town. Agriculture is developing in this area, most of area is now under irrigation facility. Many farmers manage to take more than one crop. Main crops are Sugarcane, jawar, soybean and groundnut.

Education facilities are not adequate as a taluka place. SRIHS was the only high school in the town a few years back, but now it has three high schools and one college.

Health facilities in government hospital are mediocre, but private hospitals are better and new ones are coming fast. Roads in the town are currently well maintained. The sanitation facilities are being improved. Cricket and Kabaddi is favorite sport among youths. Many tennis ball tournaments are organised commonly.

Ganesh festival is the main festival which all people irrespective of their caste and religion celebrate together.

== See also ==
- Tardal, a village located nearby
