= Chhatrapati Shahu Maharaj Terminus =

Railway terminus in the Kolhapur, India

General information
- Other names: Shri Chhatrapati Shahu Maharaj Terminus
- Location: Kolhapur, Maharashtra; India
- Coordinates: 16.7027°N 74.2377°E
- Elevation: 536.72 metres (1,760.9 ft)
- System: Indian Railways Terminal station
- Owner: Indian Railways
- Operator: Central Railway
- Line: Miraj–Kolhapur
- Platforms: 3 (construction going on of 4th and 5th platform)

Construction
- Structure type: At ground
- Parking: Available

Other information
- Status: Operating
- Station code: KOP
- Division(s): Pune

History
- Opened: 1886 (133 years)
- Rebuilt: No
- Former names: Great Indian Peninsula Railway
Location

Chhatrapati Shahu Maharaj Terminus (officially Shri Chhatrapati Shahu Maharaj Terminus Kolhapur) (station code: KOP) is the main railway terminus in the city of Kolhapur, India. It is the end point of the Miraj to Kolhapur railway line and falls under Pune division. It has a freight yard called Gur Market with a capacity of five freight trains nearly 4 km (2.5 miles) away from the station. Kolhapur is the centre of trade for southern Maharashtra (with electrification between Miraj and Kolhapur). This station connects Kolhapur with major cities such as Mumbai, Pune, Ahmedabad, Delhi, and Dhanbad through express trains. Some important express trains are the Mahalaxmi Express (Kolhapur–Mumbai), Deekshabhoomi Express (Kolhapur - Dhanbad), and Haripriya Express (Kolhapur–Tirupati). IRCTC also runs the tourist luxury train Deccan Odyssey at Kolhapur station. There are daily passenger shuttle services between Kolhapur, Miraj and Pune.

== Etymology ==
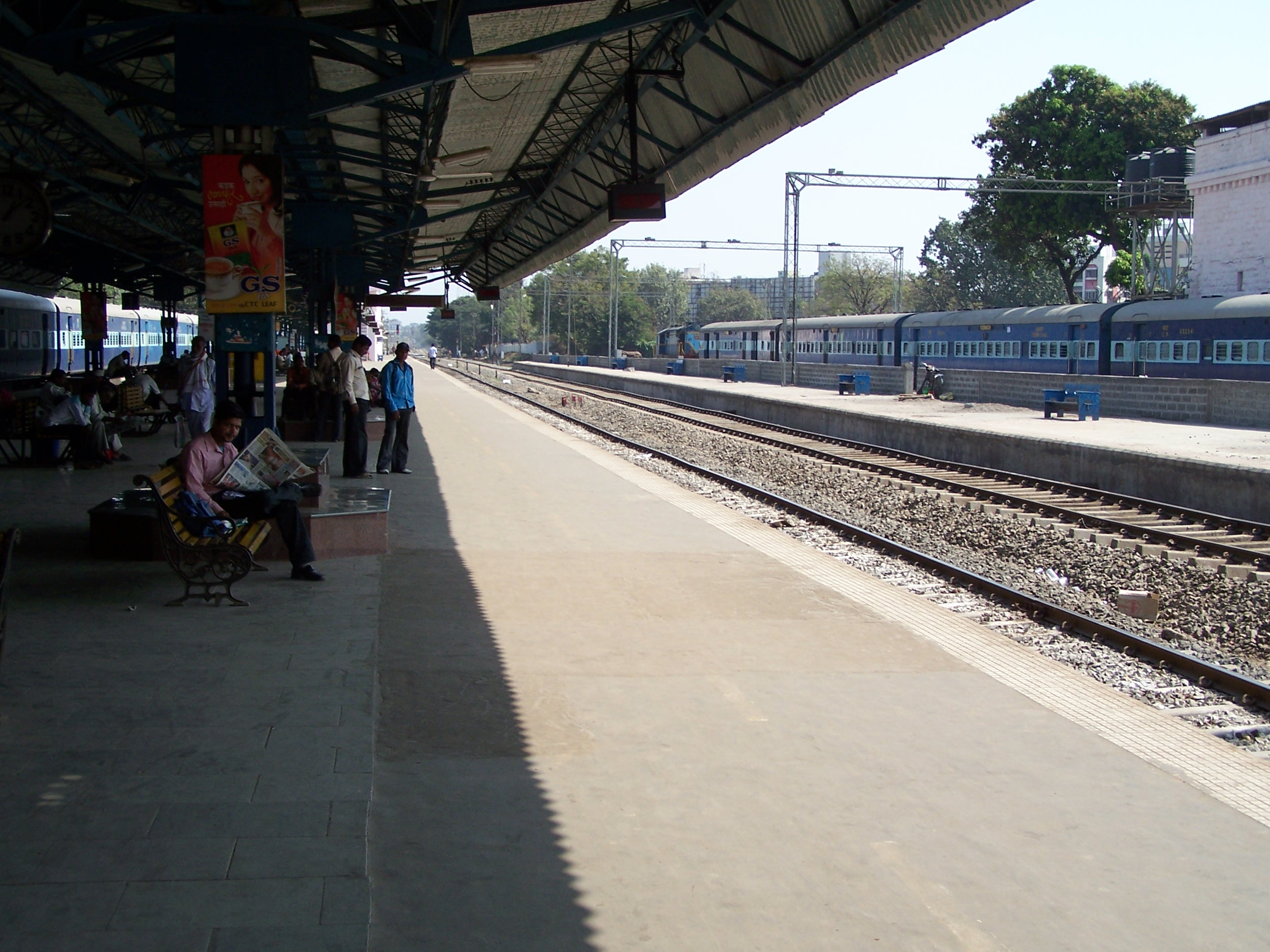
Shri Chhatrapati Shahu Maharaj Terminus

This railway station is named after Shahu Maharaj of Kolhapur.

== Future projects ==
The Minister of Railways announced the Miraj–Kolhapur–Vaibhavwadi rail route and electrification of Kolhapur-Miraj–Pune rail route in 2016–17.

Miraj–Kolhapur–Vaibhavwadi rail route will have new station of Kolhapur at Kasaba Bawada since the original Kolhapur station is in the busiest point of the city. New line will start from Rukadi towards Vaibhavwadi through Kasaba Bawada area of Kolhapur. Currently, the station is being upgraded under Amrit Bharat scheme.

== Trains ==
=== Express/Mails ===
- Ahmedabad–SCSMT Kolhapur Express
- SCSMT Kolhapur-Dhanbad Weekly Express
- SCSMT Kolhapur–Hazrat Nizamuddin Superfast Express
- Gondia-SCSMT Kolhapur Maharashtra Express
- Kalburgi SCSMT Kolhapur Express
- Mumbai CSMT-SCSMT Kolhapur Koyna Express
- Mumbai CSMT-SCSMT Kolhapur Mahalaxmi Express
- Tirupati-SCSMT Kolhapur Haripriya Express
- Nagpur–SCSMT Kolhapur Express
- Pune-SCSMT Kolhapur-Pune Vande Bharat Express
- NOTES:

† – Runs attached with Kolhapur–Gondia up to Bhusaval Junction.

=== Ordinary ===
1. SCSMT Kolhapur–Pune DEMU
2. SCSMT Kolhapur–Miraj DEMU
3. SCSMT Kolhapur–Satara DEMU
4. SCSMT Kolhapur–Sangli DEMU
