= Tirupati–Sainagar Shirdi Weekly Express (via Guntur) =

Train in India

Tirupati - Sainagar Shirdi Weekly Express

Overview
- Service type: Express
- Status: Active
- Locale: Andhra Pradesh, Telangana, Karnataka and Maharashtra
- First service: 14 December 2025; 4 months ago
- Current operator: South Central (SC)

Route
- Termini: Tirupati (TPTY); Sainagar Shirdi (SNSI)
- Stops: 31
- Distance travelled: 1,441 km (895 mi)
- Average journey time: 30h 45m
- Service frequency: Weekly
- Train number: 17425 / 17426

On-board services
- Classes: General Unreserved, Sleeper Class, AC 3rd Class, AC 2nd Class
- Seating arrangements: No
- Sleeping arrangements: Yes
- Catering facilities: Pantry Car
- Observation facilities: Large windows
- Baggage facilities: No
- Other facilities: Below the seats

Technical
- Rolling stock: LHB coach
- Track gauge: 1,676 mm (5 ft 6 in)
- Electrification: 25 kV 50 Hz AC Overhead line
- Operating speed: 130 km/h (81 mph) maximum, 47 km/h (29 mph) average including halts.
- Track owner: Indian Railways

The 17425 / 17426 Tirupati–Sainagar Shirdi Weekly Express (via Guntur) is an express train belonging to South Central Railway zone that runs between the city Tirupati of Andhra Pradesh and Sainagar Shirdi of Maharashtra in India.

It operates as train number 17425 from Tirupati to Sainagar Shirdi and as train number 17426 in the reverse direction, serving the states of Maharashtra, Karnataka, Telangana and Andhra Pradesh.

== Services ==
• 17425/ Tirupati–Sainagar Shirdi Weekly Express has an average speed of 47 km/h and covers 1441 km in 30h 45m.

• 17426/ Sainagar Shirdi–Tirupati Weekly Express has an average speed of 48 km/h and covers 1439 km in 29h 55m.

== Routes and halts ==
The Important Halts of the train are :

● Tirupati

● Renigunta Junction

● Gudur Junction

● Nellore

● Ongole

● Chirala

● Tenali Junction

● Guntur Junction

● Sattenapalle

● Piduguralla

● Nadikudi

● Miryalaguda

● Nalgonda

● Secunderabad Junction

● Lingampalli

● Vikarabad Junction

● Zaheerabad

● Bidar

● Bhalki

● Udgir

● Latur Road

● Parli Vaijnath

● Gangakhed

● Parbhani Junction

● Selu

● Jalna

● Chhatrapati Sambhajinagar

● Nagarsol

● Manmad Junction

● Kopargaon

● Sainagar Shirdi

== Schedule ==
• 17425 - 4:00 AM (Sunday) [Tirupati]

• 17426 - 7:35 PM (Monday) [Sainagar Shirdi]

== Coach composition ==
1. General Unreserved - 4
2. Sleeper Class - 6
3. AC 3rd Class - 4
4. AC 2nd Class - 2

== Traction ==
As the entire route is fully electrified it is hauled by a Lallaguda and Vijayawada Shed-based WAP-7 electric locomotive from Tirupati to Sainagar Shirdi and vice versa.

== Rake Reversal or rake share ==
The train will reverse 2 times :

1. Parli Vaijnath
2. Parbhani Junction

Rake Share :

1. Tirupati–Chikkmagaluru Weekly Express (17423/17424).

== See also ==
Trains from Tirupati :

1. Tirupati–Karimnagar Superfast Express
2. Andhra Pradesh Sampark Kranti Express
3. Tirupati–Jammu Tawi Humsafar Express
4. Secunderabad–Tirupati Vande Bharat Express
5. Tirupati–Chikkmagaluru Weekly Express

Trains from Sainagar Shirdi :

1. Dadar–Sainagar Shirdi Superfast Express
2. Sainagar Shirdi–Howrah Express
3. Sainagar Shirdi–Visakhapatnam Express
4. Mumbai CSMT–Sainagar Shirdi Vande Bharat Express
5. Sainagar Shirdi–Machilipatnam Express

== Notes ==
a. Runs 1 day in a week with both directions.
