= Sainagar Shirdi–Pandharpur Express =

Express train in India

Sainagar Shirdi – Pandharpur Express
Overview
- Service type: Express
- First service: 3 December 2011; 14 years ago
- Current operator: Central Railway zone

Route
- Termini: Sainagar Shirdi (SNSI); Pandharpur (PVR)
- Stops: 10
- Distance travelled: 349 km (217 mi)
- Average journey time: 7 hours 15 minutes
- Service frequency: Three days (Note: Runs three in a week for every direction.)
- Train number: 11001/11002

On-board services
- Classes: Second Class sitting, AC 3 Tier, Sleeper 3 Tier, Unreserved
- Seating arrangements: No
- Sleeping arrangements: Yes
- Catering facilities: No
- Entertainment facilities: No

Technical
- Rolling stock: 2
- Track gauge: 1,676 mm (5 ft 6 in)
- Operating speed: 48 km/h (30 mph)

Sainagar Shirdi – Pandharpur Express is an intercity train of the Indian Railways connecting Sainagar Shirdi in Maharashtra and Pandharpur of in Maharashtra. It is currently being operated with 11001/11002 train numbers on thrice a week basis.

== Service ==
The 11001/Sainagar Shirdi – Pandharpur Express has an average speed of 48 km/h and covers 349 km in 7 hrs 15 mins. 11002/Pandharpur – Sainagar Shirdi Express has an average speed of 47 km/h and 349 km in 7 hrs 30 mins.

== Route and halts ==
- Sainagar Shirdi
- Puntamba Junction
- Belapur
- Ahilyanagar
- Daund Junction
- Bhigwan
- Parewadi
- Jeur
- Kem
- Kurduvadi Junction
- Modnimb
- Pandharpur

== Traction ==
Both trains are hauled by either a Pune Loco Shed based WDM 3A or Kalyan Loco Shed based WDM 3A diesel locomotive from Shirdi to Pandharpur.

== Direction reversal ==
Train Reverses its direction 2 times:

- Puntamba Junction
- Kurduvadi Junction

== See also ==
- Karnataka Express
- Mumbai CST - Pandharpur Fast Passenger
- Sainagar Shirdi-Chhatrapati Shivaji Terminus Fast Passenger
