= Pune–Nagpur Express =

Nagpur Pune Express
Overview
- Service type: Superfast Express
- First service: 26 August 2006
- Current operator: Central Railways

Route
- Termini: Pune Junction; Nagpur Junction
- Stops: 16
- Distance travelled: 889 km (552 mi)
- Average journey time: 15 hours 45 mins as 12135 Pune–Nagpur Express, 15 hours 10 mins as 12136 Nagpur–Pune Express.
- Service frequency: 3 days a week. 12135 Pune–Nagpur Express – Tuesday, Thursday & Sunday, 12136 Nagpur–Pune Express – Monday, Wednesday & Saturday.
- Train number: 12135⇋12136

On-board services
- Classes: AC 2 tier, AC 3 tier, Sleeper Class, General Unreserved
- Seating arrangements: Yes
- Sleeping arrangements: Yes
- Catering facilities: No

Technical
- Rolling stock: Standard Indian Railways coaches
- Track gauge: 1,676 mm (5 ft 6 in)
- Electrification: Fully electrified
- Operating speed: 110 km/h (68 mph) maximum, 57 km/h (35 mph), including halts

The 12135⇋12136 Nagpur–Pune Express is a Superfast Express train belonging to Indian Railways – Central Railway zone that runs between Nagpur Junction and Pune Junction in India.

It operates as train number 12135 from Pune Junction to Nagpur Junction and as train number 12136 in the reverse direction, serving the state of Maharashtra.

== Coaches ==
The 12135⇋12136 Nagpur–Pune SF Express has one AC 2 tier coach, six AC 3 tier coaches, eleven Sleeper coaches, two General Unreserved coaches and two SLR (Seating Luggage Rack) coaches. It does not carry a pantry car.

As is customary with most train services in India, coach configuration may be amended at the discretion of Indian Railways depending on demand.

The train was upgraded to the new modern LHB Coaches on 1 July 2026

== Service ==
The 12135 Nagpur–Pune Express covers the distance of 899 km (559 mi) in 15 hours 45 mins (57.08 km/h) and in 15 hours 10 mins as 12136 Nagpur–Pune Express (59.27 km/h).

As the average speed of the train is above 55 km/h (34 mph), Indian Railway rules require a Superfast surcharge..

== Routeing ==
The 12135 ⇋12136 Nagpur–Pune Express runs from Pune Junction via Daund Chord Line, Ahilyanagar, Belapur, Kopargaon, Manmad Junction, Chalisgaon Junction, Jalgaon Junction, Bhusaval Junction, Malkapur, Shegaon, Akola Junction, Murtizapur Junction, Badnera Junction, Dhamangaon, Pulgaon, Wardha Junction, Ajni to Nagpur.

The train halts at Daund Chord Line railway station to avoid loco reversal at Daund Junction.

== Traction ==
The train is hauled by a Bhusawal loco shed-based WAP 4 or a Ajni loco shed-based WAP 7 end to end.

== Operation ==
12135 Nagpur–Pune Express runs from Pune Junction every Tuesday, Thursday & Sunday reaching Nagpur the next day.

12136 Nagpur–Pune Express runs from Nagpur Junction every Monday, Wednesday & Saturday reaching Pune Junction the next day.

== Major stoppage ==
1. Nagpur Junction
2. Ajni
3. Wardha Junction
4. Pulgaon
5. Dhamangaon
6. Badnera Junction
7. Akola Junction
8. Shegaon
9. Malkapur
10. Bhusaval Junction
11. Jalgaon Junction
12. Chalisgaon Junction
13. Manmad Junction
14. Kopargaon
15. Belapur
16. Ahilyanagar
17. Daund Chord Line
18. Pune Junction

== See also ==
- Pune–Nagpur Garib Rath Express
- Dedicated Intercity trains of India
