= Muzaffarpur–Hadapsar (Pune) AC Express =

Train in India

Muzaffarpur - Hadapsar (Pune) AC Express

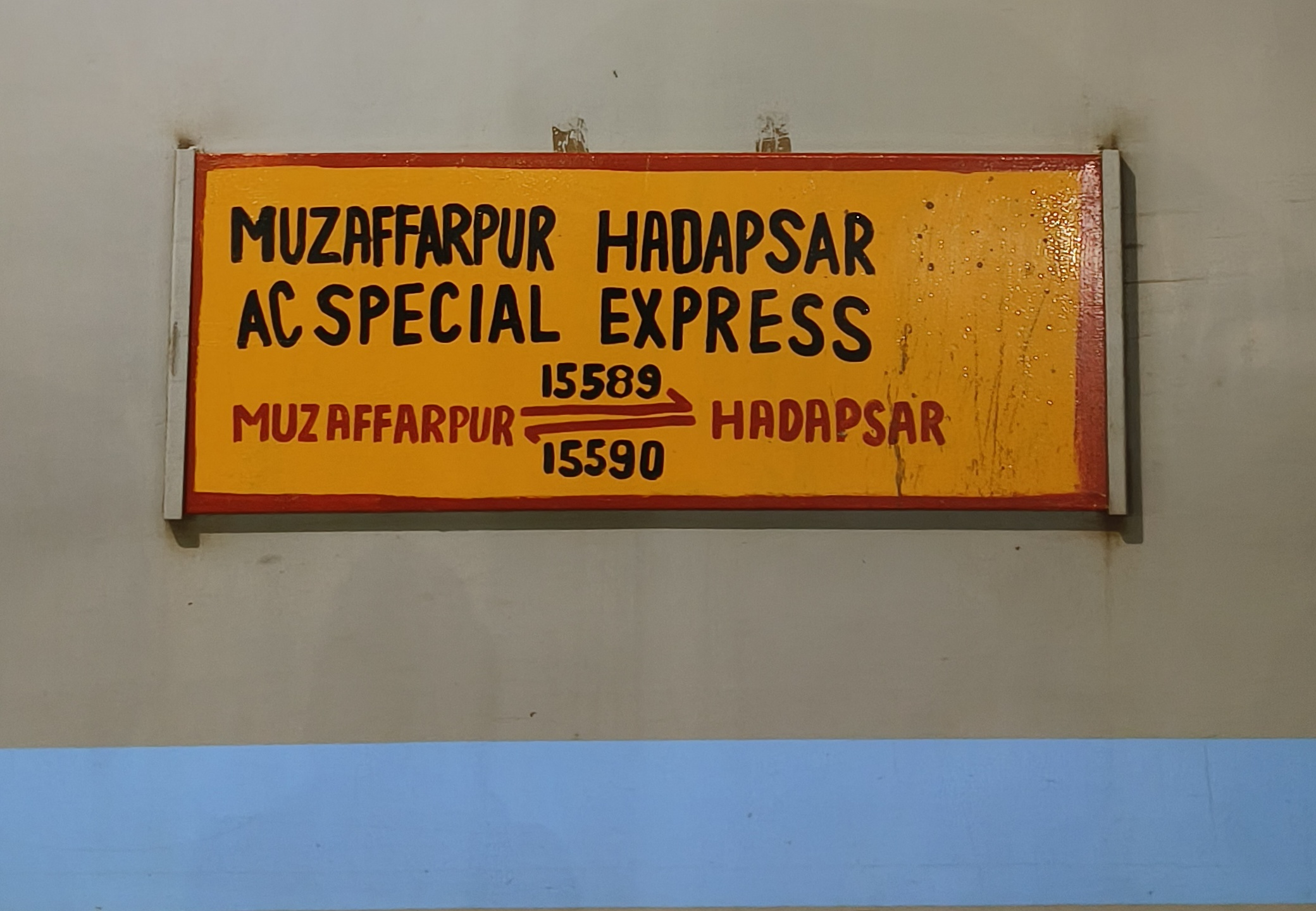
- MFP - HDP AC Express standing at Muzaffarpur Junction

Overview
- Service type: AC Express
- Status: Active
- Locale: Bihar, Uttar Pradesh, Madhya Pradesh and Maharashtra
- First service: 8 December 2025; 11 months ago (commercial service); First special commercial run: 3 November 2023; 3 years ago
- Current operator: East Central Railways

Route
- Termini: Muzaffarpur Junction (MFP); Hadapsar (Pune) (HDP)
- Stops: 25
- Distance travelled: 1,825 km (1,134 mi)
- Average journey time: 35h 0m
- Service frequency: Weekly
- Train number: 15589 / 15590

On-board services
- Classes: AC 2-Tier; AC 3-Tier Economy
- Seating arrangements: Yes
- Sleeping arrangements: Yes
- Catering facilities: IRCTC E-Catering; Zomato; Swiggy
- Observation facilities: Large windows
- Baggage facilities: Available

Technical
- Rolling stock: LHB coach
- Track gauge: 1,676 mm (5 ft 6 in)
- Operating speed: 130 km/h (max), 52 km/h (avg) including halts

The 15589/15590 Muzaffarpur–Hadapsar (Pune) AC Express is a Superfast Express train operated by East Central Railway zone of Indian Railways which runs between Muzaffarpur Junction of Bihar and Hadapsar (Pune) of Maharashtra in India.

== Overview ==
- Originally introduced in 2023 as a Festival Special service with train numbers 05289/05290, it quickly gained popularity, particularly among passengers from North Bihar’s Tirhut region, Saran Region, and Mithila region, for providing a comfortable and direct travel option to Western India
- Due to its growing demand, the service was incorporated into the regular timetable under the Trains at a Glance (TAG) 2025 schedule.
- On October 2, 2025, Indian Railways issued an official notification renaming the Muzaffarpur–Pune AC Special train to Muzaffarpur–Pune AC Express.
- The train has been assigned new permanent numbers 15589/15590, and this change will come into effect from December 8, 2025, from Muzaffarpur, and from December 10, 2025, from Hadapsar (Pune).

This train serves a vital role in connecting Bihar with Maharashtra, catering especially to students, professionals, and migrant workers.

== Schedule ==
15589 / 15590 Muzaffarpur–Hadapsar Express Schedule
Train Type	Express
Distance	1816 km (15589) / 1816 km (15590)
Average Speed	~50 km/h
Journey Time (MFP → Hadapsar)	~35 hrs 05 min
Journey Time (Hadapsar → MFP)	~36 hrs 00 min
Classes Available	2A & 3A
Operating Days	Weekly
Operator	East Central Railway

== Route and halts ==
15589 Muzaffarpur–Hadapsar Express and 15590 Hadapsar–Muzaffarpur Express Schedule
Sr.	15589 MFP–HDP				15590 HDP–MFP			
Sr.	Station	Day	Arr.	Dep.	Station	Day	Arr.	Dep.
1	Muzaffarpur Junction	1	—	19:20	Hadapsar	1	—	10:00
2	Hajipur Junction	1	20:05	20:10	Daund Chord Line	1	11:08	11:10
3	Sonpur Junction	1	20:30	20:32	Ahilyanagar	1	12:32	12:35
4	Patliputra	1	21:50	22:00	Belapur (BAP)	1	13:42	13:45
5	Danapur	1	22:13	22:15	Kopargaon	1	14:54	14:57
6	Ara Junction	1	22:48	22:50	Manmad Junction	1	16:50	16:55
7	Buxar	1	23:32	23:34	Bhusaval Junction	1	19:30	19:35
8	Pt. Deen Dayal Upadhyaya Junction	2	01:43	01:50	Khandwa Junction	1	22:03	22:05
9	Prayagraj Chheoki	2	03:50	03:52	Itarsi Junction	2	00:40	00:50
10	Manikpur Junction	2	06:48	06:50	Pipariya	2	01:28	01:30
11	Satna	2	07:45	07:50	Narsinghpur	2	02:58	03:00
12	Maihar	2	08:18	08:20	Jabalpur Junction	2	04:40	04:50
13	Katni Junction	2	09:05	09:10	Katni Junction	2	05:55	06:00
14	Jabalpur Junction	2	10:35	10:45	Maihar	2	06:48	06:50
15	Narsinghpur	2	11:43	11:45	Satna	2	07:10	07:15
16	Pipariya	2	12:43	12:45	Manikpur Junction	2	09:13	09:15
17	Itarsi Junction	2	14:25	14:35	Prayagraj Chheoki	2	11:08	11:10
18	Khandwa Junction	2	17:00	17:03	Pt. Deen Dayal Upadhyaya Junction	2	14:58	15:05
19	Bhusaval Junction	2	19:00	19:05	Buxar	2	16:13	16:15
20	Manmad Junction	2	21:35	21:40	Ara Junction	2	17:08	17:10
21	Kopargaon	2	22:37	22:40	Danapur	2	17:58	18:00
22	Belapur (BAP)	2	23:27	23:30	Patliputra	2	18:25	18:35
23	Ahilyanagar	3	02:37	02:40	Sonpur Junction	2	19:38	19:40
24	Daund Chord Line	3	04:33	04:35	Hajipur Junction	2	19:50	19:55
25	Hadapsar	3	06:25	—	Muzaffarpur Junction	2	22:00	—

== Coach composition ==
Category	Coaches	Total
End-on-Generator / Luggage Parcel Van	LPR, LPR	2
AC 3 Tier Economy (3E)	M1, M2, M3, M4, M5, M6, M7, M8, M9, M10, M11, M12	12
AC 2 Tier (2A)	A1, A2, A3, A4, A5, A6, A7, A8	8
Total Coaches		22

- Primary Maintenance - Muzaffarpur Coaching Depot

== See also ==
- AC Express (Indian Railways)
- Muzaffarpur Junction railway station
- Hadapsar railway station
- East Central Railway zone
- Pune–Darbhanga Gyan Ganga Express
- Muzaffarpur
- Pune
