= Dadar–Sainagar Shirdi Weekly Superfast Express =

Train in India

Overview
- Service type: Superfast
- First service: 4 August 2017; 8 years ago
- Current operator: Central Railways

Route
- Termini: Dadar (DR); Sainagar Shirdi (SNSI)
- Stops: 16
- Distance travelled: 332 km (206 mi)
- Average journey time: 6h
- Service frequency: Weekly (Note: Runs one day in a week for every direction.)
- Train number: 22147 / 22148

On-board services
- Classes: AC 2 tier, AC 3 tier, Sleeper class, General Unreserved
- Seating arrangements: Yes
- Sleeping arrangements: Yes
- Catering facilities: On-board catering E-catering
- Baggage facilities: No
- Other facilities: Below the seats

Technical
- Rolling stock: ICF coach
- Track gauge: 1,676 mm (5 ft 6 in)
- Operating speed: 56 km/h (35 mph) average including halts
Route map
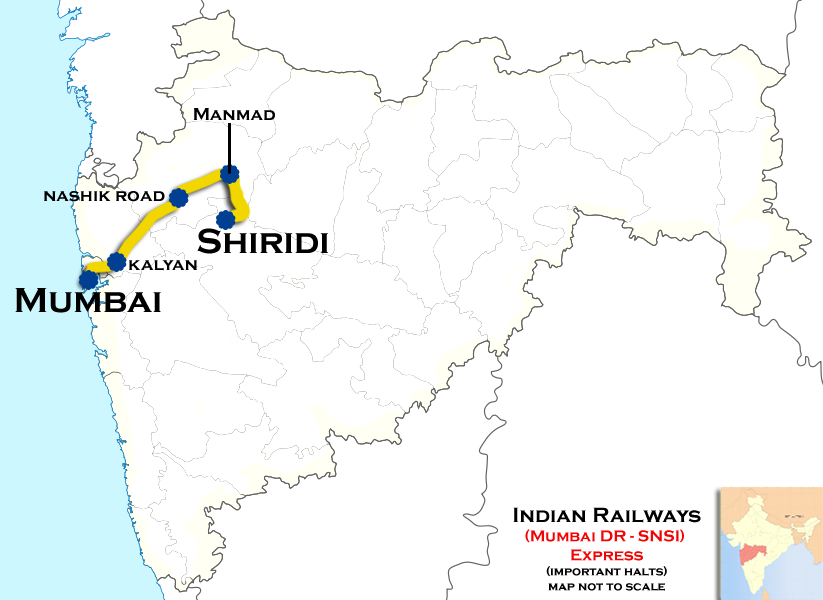

The 22147 / 22148 Dadar–Sainagar Shirdi Weekly Superfast Express is a Superfast train belonging to Central Railway zone that runs between Dadar and Sainagar Shirdi in India. It is currently being operated with 22147/22148 train numbers on a weekly basis.

== Service ==
The 22147/Dadar–Sainagar Shirdi Superfast Express has an average speed of 55 km/h and covers 332 km in 6h. The 22148/Sainagar Shirdi–Dadar Superfast Express has an average speed of 55 km/h and covers 332 km in 6h.

== Route and halts ==
The important halts of the train are:

- Dadar
- Thane
- Kalyan Junction
- Kasara
- Igatpuri
- Nasik Road
- Manmad Junction
- Kopargaon
- Sainagar Shirdi

== Coach composition ==
The train has standard ICF rakes with max speed of 110 kmph. The train consists of 18 coaches:

- 1 AC II Tier
- 2 AC III Tier
- 7 Sleeper coaches
- 6 General Unreserved
- 2 Seating cum Luggage Rake

== Traction ==
Both trains are hauled by a Kalyan Loco Shed-based WDM-3D diesel locomotive from Dadar to Shirdi.

== Rake sharing ==
The train shares its rake with 11001/11002 Sainagar Shirdi–Pandharpur Express and 12131/12132 Dadar–Sainagar Shirdi Superfast Express.

== Direction reversal ==
The train reverses its direction at;

- Manmad Junction

== See also ==
- Dadar–Sainagar Shirdi Superfast Express
- Sainagar Shirdi–Pandharpur Express
