= Mysuru–Sainagar Shirdi Express =

Mysuru Junction Sainagar Shirdi Express
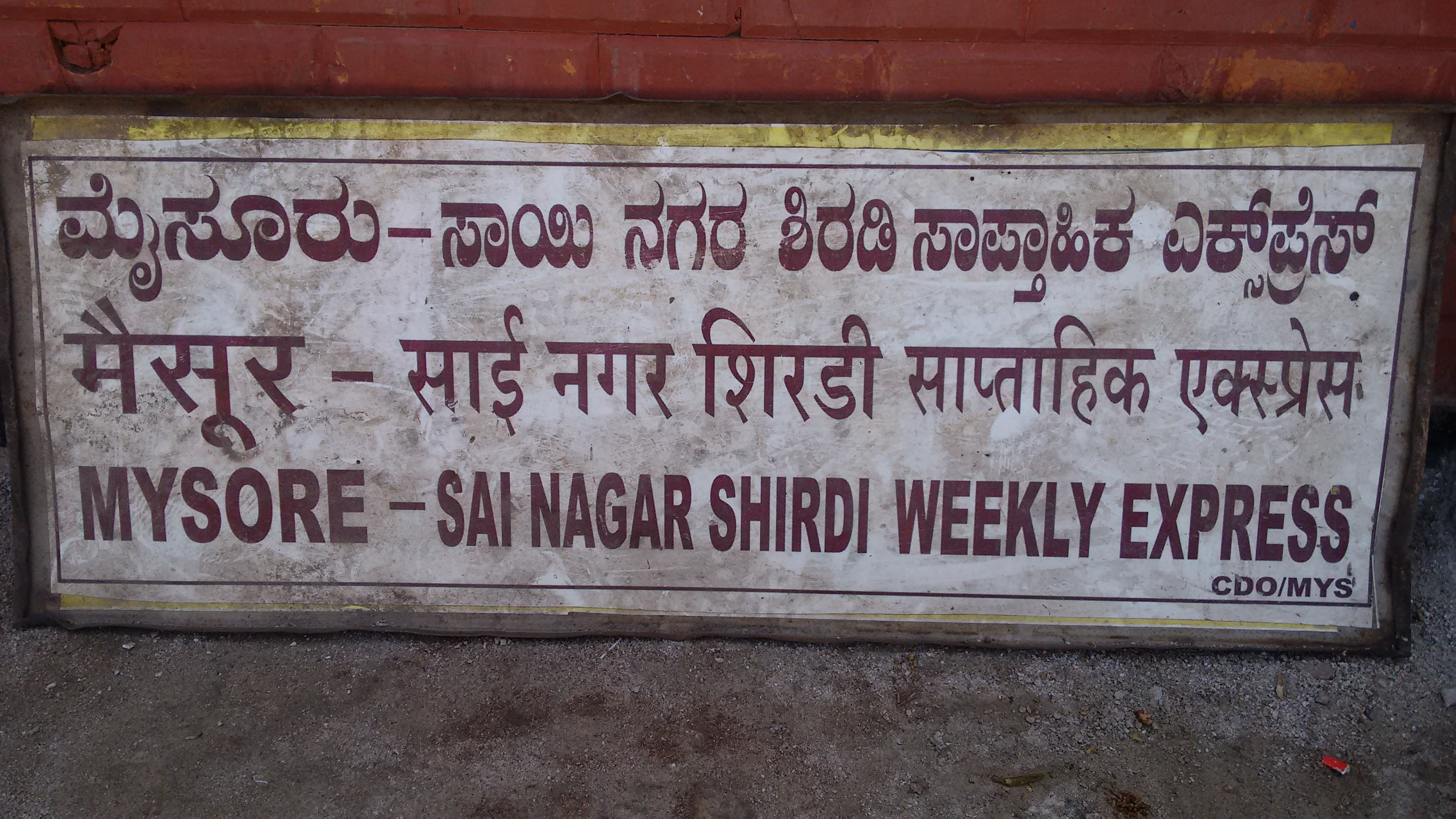
- Mysuru–Sainagar Shirdi Express train board

Overview
- Service type: Express
- Locale: Karnataka, Andhra Pradesh & Maharashtra
- First service: 10 July 2012; 14 years ago
- Current operator: South Western Railway zone

Route
- Termini: Mysuru Junction; Sainagar Shirdi
- Stops: 24
- Distance travelled: 1,306 km (812 mi)
- Average journey time: 30 hours 12 mins
- Service frequency: weekly
- Train number: 16217 / 16218

On-board services
- Classes: AC 2 Tier, AC 3 Tier, Sleeper Class & General Unreserved
- Seating arrangements: Yes
- Sleeping arrangements: Yes
- Catering facilities: yes pantry car attached

Technical
- Rolling stock: Standard Indian Railways coaches
- Track gauge: 1,676 mm (5 ft 6 in)
- Operating speed: 55 km/h (34 mph)
Route map
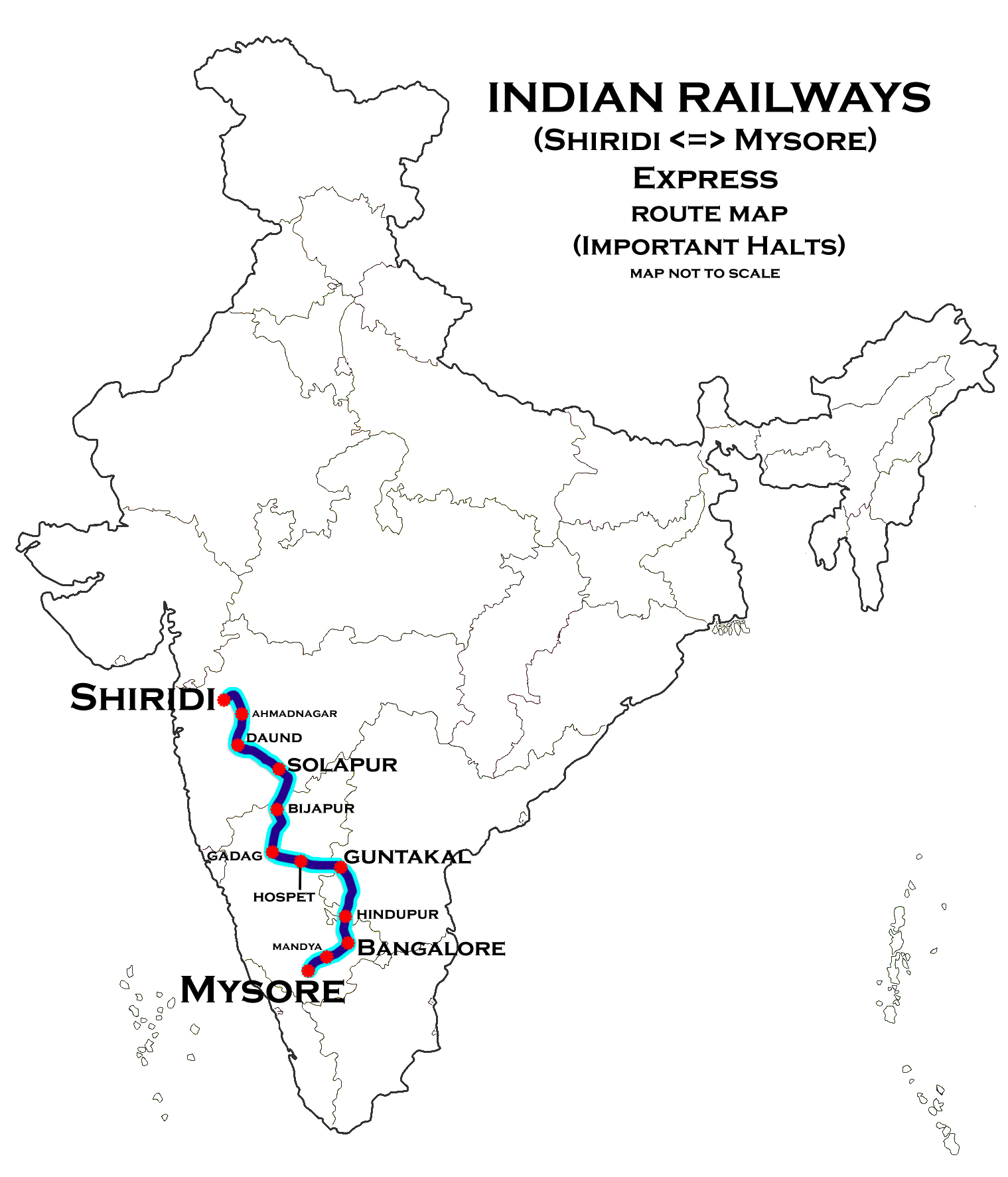

16217 / 18 Mysuru–Sainagar Shirdi Express is an Express train belonging to Indian Railways South western Railway zone that run between Mysuru Junction and Sainagar Shirdi in India.

== Service ==
It operates as train number 16217 from Mysuru Junction to Sainagar Shirdi and as train number 16218 in the reverse direction, serving the states of Karnataka, Andhra Pradesh & Maharashtra . The train covers the distance of 1,306 km (812 mi) in 25 hours 17 mins approximately at a speed of 55 km/h (34 mph).

== Coaches ==
The 16217 / 18 Mysuru–Sainagar Shirdi Express has one AC 2-tier, five AC 3-tier, 11 sleeper class, three general unreserved & two SLR (seating with luggage rake) coaches . It doesn't carries a pantry car.

As with most train services in India, coach composition may be amended at the discretion of Indian Railways depending on demand.

== Coach composition ==
The train has standard lhb rakes with max speed of 110 kmph.

- 1 AC I Tier
- 1 AC II Tier
- 2 AC III Tier
- 11 Sleeper coaches
- 6 General
- 2 Second-class Luggage/parcel van

Loco	1	2	3	4	5	6	7	8	9	10	11	12	13	14	15	16	17	18	19	20	21
	GRD	GEN	S1	S2	S3	S4	S5	S6	S7	S8	S9	S10	S11	S12	B1	B2	A1	H1	GEN	GEN	SLR

== Routeing ==
The 16217 / 18 Mysore–Sainagar Shirdi Express runs from Mysore Junction via KSR Bengaluru, Dharmavaram Junction, Guntakal Junction, Ballari Junction, Gadag Junction, Vijapur, Solapur, Daund Junction, Ahilyanagar, Puntamba to Sainagar Shirdi.

== Schedule ==
Train number	Station code	Departure station	Departure time	Departure day	Arrival station	Arrival time	Arrival day
16217	MYS	Mysore	5:30 AM	MON	Sainagar Shirdi	11:30 AM	TUE
16218	SNSI	Sainagar Shirdi	11:55 PM	TUE	Mysore	6:00 AM	THU

== Rake sharing ==
16209/16210 – Mysore Ajmer Express

== Reversals ==
Puntamba Junction

== Traction ==
Though, this route is electrified, a Krishnarajapuram-based diesel WDP-4D loco pulls the train to its destination.
