= Chennai–Sainagar Shirdi Express =

Train in India

MGR Chennai Central–Sainagar Shirdi Express

Overview
- Service type: Superfast
- Locale: Tamil Nadu, Andhra Pradesh, Karnataka & Maharashtra
- First service: 8 July 2011; 15 years ago
- Current operator: Southern Railway

Route
- Termini: MGR Chennai Central (MAS); Sainagar Shirdi (SNSI)
- Stops: 21
- Distance travelled: 1,391 km (864 mi)
- Average journey time: 25 hours 05 mins
- Service frequency: Weekly
- Train number: 22601 / 22602

On-board services
- Classes: AC 2 Tier, AC 3 Tier, Sleeper Class, General Unreserved
- Seating arrangements: Yes
- Sleeping arrangements: Yes
- Catering facilities: On-board catering, E-catering
- Observation facilities: Large windows
- Baggage facilities: Available
- Other facilities: Below the seats

Technical
- Rolling stock: LHB coach
- Track gauge: 1,676 mm (5 ft 6 in)
- Operating speed: 55 km/h (34 mph) average including halts.
Route map
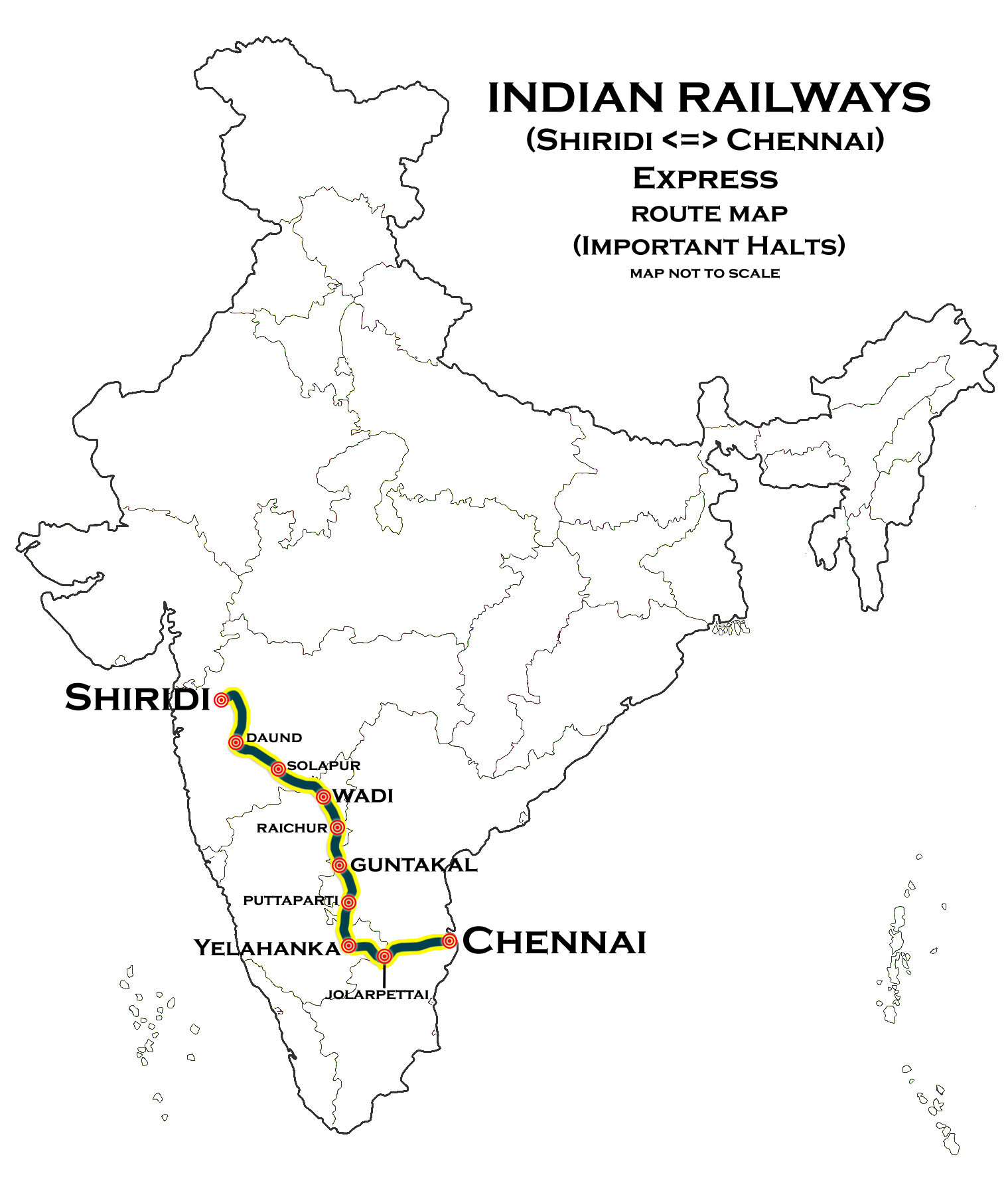

The 22601 / 22602 MGR Chennai Central–Sainagar Shirdi Express is a superfast express train belonging to Indian Railways' Southern Railway zone that run between MGR Chennai Central and Sainagar Shirdi in India. This is the only train that connects Chennai with Dharmavaram, Ananthapur, Ahmadnagar and Shirdi.

== Service ==
It operates as train number 22601 from Chennai Central to Sainagar Shirdi and as train number 22602 in the reverse direction serving the states of Tamil Nadu, Andhra Pradesh, Karnataka & Maharashtra. The train covers the distance of 1,391 km (864 mi) in 25 hours 05 mins approximately at a speed of (55 km/h (34 mph)).

== Coaches ==
The 22601 / 02 Chennai Central–Sainagar Shirdi Superfast Express has Three AC 2 Tier, Three AC 3 Tier, 13 Sleeper Class, 3 General Unreserved & Two SLR (seating with luggage rake) coaches. It doesn't carry a pantry car. As with most train services in India, coach composition may be amended at the discretion of Indian Railways depending on demand.

== Routing ==
The 22601 / 02 Chennai Central–Sainagar Shirdi Superfast Express runs from Chennai Central via Arakkonam Junction, Katpadi Junction, Krishnarajapuram, Sathya Sai Prasanthi Nilayam, Guntakal Junction, Wadi Junction, Solapur, Daund Junction, Ahilyanagar, Puntamba to Sainagar Shirdi.

== Traction ==
Earlier they used run with Golden Rock-based WDG-3A. Because this route is fully electrified, a Royapuram Loco Shed or Erode Loco Shed-based WAP-7 electric locomotive pulls the train to its destination.
