= Karnataka Express =

Train in India

Karnataka Superfast Express
Overview
- Service type: Superfast Express
- Status: Active
- Locale: Karnataka, Andhra Pradesh, Maharastra, Madhya Pradesh, UttarPradesh, Haryana & Delhi
- First service: 1 March 1977; 49 years ago
- Current operator: South Western Railway

Route
- Termini: KSR Bengaluru City (SBC); New Delhi (NDLS)
- Stops: 33
- Distance travelled: 2,392 km (1,486 mi)
- Average journey time: 37 hours 30 minutes
- Service frequency: Daily
- Train number: 12627 / 12628
- Line used: Bangalore - Delhi

On-board services
- Classes: AC First Class, AC 2 Tier, AC 3 Tier, Sleeper Class, General Unreserved
- Seating arrangements: Yes
- Sleeping arrangements: Yes
- Catering facilities: Available
- Observation facilities: Large windows
- Baggage facilities: Below the seats

Technical
- Rolling stock: LHB coach
- Track gauge: 1,676 mm (5 ft 6 in)
- Operating speed: 130 km/h (81 mph) maximum, 65 km/h (40 mph) average including halts.

The 12627 / 12628 Karnataka S.F Express is a Daily Superfast Express train that runs between K. S. R Bengaluru City Junction, Bangalore the capital of Karnataka, and the Indian capital Delhi New Delhi.

A popular daily Superfast train to Shirdi, Karnataka Express is overcrowded throughout the year.

== History ==
Bangalore was first connected to the north by the Karnataka–Kerala (also known as KK) Express, introduced in 1976. The train ran from New Delhi to jolarpet and was split into two trains, one going to KSR Bengaluru and the other to Trivandrum. This continued until 1983, when Karnataka Express was launched in the February 1983 budget as a single biweekly train running on 3 routes on different days of the week. The routes were via Secunderabad, Manmad, and Vijayawada. The train was then rerouted via Dharmavaram, Guntakal, Wadi, Daund, - Bhusaval and continues to run on the same route to this day.

== Route and halts ==
Major stations along the route are KSR Bengaluru, Yelahanka Junction, Puttaparthi, Dharmavaram Junction, Anantapur, Guntakal Junction, Wadi Junction,Kalaburagi Junction, Solapur, Daund Junction, Ahilyanagar, Manmad Junction, Bhusaval Junction, Burhanpur, Khandwa Junction, Itarsi Junction, Bhopal Junction, Jhansi Junction, Gwalior Junction, Agra Cantonment and New Delhi. It halts at several smaller stations, like Hindupur and Kopargaon.

Apart from the stations mentioned above, 12627 also halts at Hazrat Nizamuddin.

== Timings ==
The train runs daily . 12627 Depart Daily at 7.30 PM from K. S. R Bengaluru City Junction and 12628 Departs Daily in the night at 8. 15 PM and 12627 reaches its destination New Delhi on the third morning at 9.00 am and 12628 Daily reaches K. S. R Bengaluru City Junction in the 12. 00 PM afternoon respectively.

== Traction ==
Earlier they used to run with diesel locomotives like WDM-3D , WDM-3A , WDG-4 , WDP-4 and WDG-3A. The train is hauled by a WAP-7 and WAP-4 electric locomotive from Royapuram Loco Shed or Lallaguda Loco Shed or Tughlakabad Loco Shed from end to end basis.

== Coach composition ==
Karnataka Express used to run with ICF coaches with WAP-4 until November 10, 2021, when it was given LHB coaches. The coach composition is as follows:

- 3 Second Sitting coaches.
- 7 sleeper coaches.
- 6 Third AC coaches.
- 2 Second AC coach.
- 1 First AC coach.
- 1 Pantry car coach.
- 1 High Capacity Parcel Van

The train runs with 23 coaches in the up direction and 23 coaches in the down direction. The train shares its rakes with 12657/12658 KSR Bengaluru - MGR Chennai central Mail.

Loco	1	2	3	4	5	6	7	8	9	10	11	12	13	14	15	16	17	18	19	20	21	22	23
	HCP	SLR	GS	S1	S2	S3	S4	S5	S6	S7	PC	B1	B2	B3	B4	B5	B6	H1	A1	A2	GS	GS	EOG

== Accidents and incidents ==
- On May 14, 1989, the Karnataka Express derailed near a bridge near Lalitpur, Uttar Pradesh killing 69. Several passengers had been complaining to the service staff of intermittent but strong and unusual jerks even before the train arrived at Bhopal, and the delayed train was speeding at more than 100 kilometres per hour. An engine or axle failure has been suspected as the cause of the derailment.
- On March 6, 1991 Karnataka Express derailed in the rain near Makalidurga ghats, about 60 km (37 mi) from Bangalore, killing 30.
- On July 28, 1997 Karnataka Express and Himsagar Express collided on the outskirts of Delhi, killing 12.
- On January 22, 2025 Karnataka Express hits 13 passengers jumped off from Pushpak Express on a adjacent track after a false fire alarm
