= Ahmednagar railway station =

Rail station in Maharashtra, India

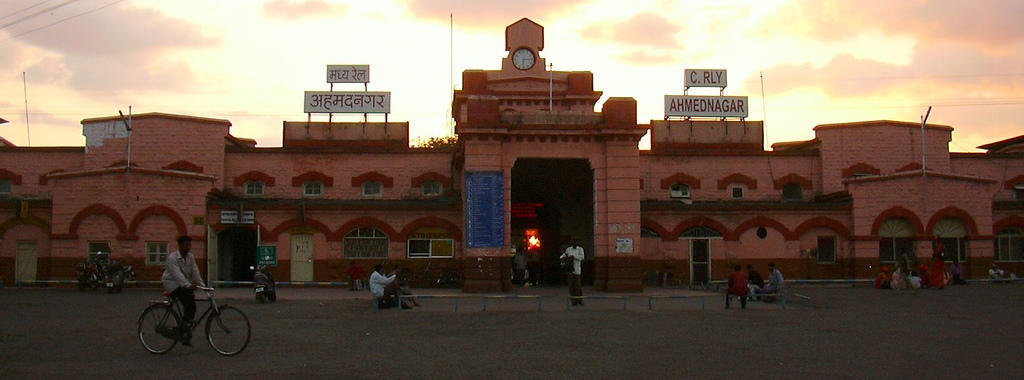

General information
- Other names: Ahilyanagar railway station (official)
- Location: Station Road, Ahmednagar; India
- Coordinates: 19.0753°N 74.7217°E
- Elevation: 650 metres (2,130 ft)
- System: Indian Railways station
- Owner: Indian Railways
- Operator: Central Railway
- Lines: Daund–Manmad line Ahmednagar–Beed–Parli Vaijnath line
- Platforms: 2

Construction
- Structure type: Standard, on ground
- Parking: Available

Other information
- Status: Functioning
- Station code: ANG
- Zone(s): central railway
- Division(s): Pune

History
- Opened: 1878
- Former names: Great Indian Peninsula Railway
Location
- Location within Maharashtra Location within India

Ahmednagar railway station, officially Ahilyanagar railway station, serves Ahmednagar in Ahmednagar district in the Indian state of Maharashtra.

== History ==
The 5 ft 6 in (1,676 mm) broad gauge Manmad–Daund line was opened in 1878, and connects the two main sections (south-east and north-east) of Great Indian Peninsula Railway. The line is being doubled by Central Railway along with 4 other busy routes nearby.

Ahmednagar station will now be a part of the Pune railway division. Twenty-four stations on the Daund–Ankai section will be merged with the Pune railway division. The Daund–Ankai section is currently under the management of the Solapur railway division. The change to the Pune division will increase the chances of starting DEMU services between Ahmednagar and Pune stations.

One of the oldest and most important railway projects of Ahmednagar railway station was the Kalyan–Ahmednagar railway project which was in the planning stage since British Raj. It was referred to as the 3rd ghat project. The surveys of this project was carried out in 1973, 2000, 2006, 2014 etc. This project was in pink book in 2010. This project could not be completed. The alignment length of this project was 184 km and it could have been shortest route for Marathwada, Andhra and Telangana. The major challenge for this project was the 18.96 km long tunnel in the Malshej Ghat section.

Malshej–Kriti–Samiti is following the Kalyan–Ahmednagar railway project. Kalyan–Murbad section which is the first phase of this project is already in survey stage.

Survey of the Ahmednagar–Aurangabad railway line with 115 kms length was also carried out in March 2021. The DPR Report on this project is under preparation.

An Ahmednagar–Karmala railway option is also being explored. Ahmednagar railway station will become an important railway junction in future to a level similar to Daund railway junction. Kalyan–Murbad–Ahmednagar line is also possible in future.

With a deadline of 2019, the Indian Railways has initiated work on the railway line between Parli and Beed, which is part of the long-pending Parli–Beed–Ahmednagar project. Work on the multicrore project has begun from both ends of the proposed 261 km track. The route has a financial outlay of Rs 2,272 crore. The centre and state governments have agreed to bear 50% of the cost each. The work is still going on at a very slow pace.

The direct route between following places had not been started as of November 2017.

- Ahmednagar–Pune
- Ahmednagar–Nashik
- Ahmednagar–Aurangabad
- Ahmednagar–Kalyan

== Amenities ==
Amenities at Ahmednagar railway station include: computerised reservation office, subscriber trunk dialling/public call office booth, waiting room, retiring room, vegetarian refreshments, and book stall.

== Through trains from Ahmednagar ==
=== Express/mail trains ===
Train name	Departure days	Arrival days
Kolhapur–Gondia Maharashtra Express; Solapur–Gondia Maharashtra Express slip Kolhapur–Gorakhpur Express slip	Daily	Daily
New Delhi (Hazrat Nizamuddin)–Vasco da Gama Goa Express; New Delhi (Hazrat Nizamuddin)–Hubli Express slip	Daily	Daily
New Delhi (Hazrat Nizamuddin)–Bangalore Karnataka Express	Daily	Daily
Pune–Jammu Tawi Jhelum Express	Daily	Daily
Pune–Howrah Azad Hind Express	Daily	Daily
Pune–Danapur Superfast Express	Daily	Daily
Beed-Pune Express	Daily	Daily
Pune-Beed Express	Daily	Daily
Sainagar shirdi- Pune Express	Daily	Daily
Pune - Sainagar shirdi Express	Daily	Daily

NOTE: Days of arrival/departure are on Ahmednagar.

- Hubli–Hazrat Nizamuddin Express is attached to Goa Express at Londa.
- Solapur–Gondia Maharashtra Express slip is attached from Maharashtra Express at Daund Junction.
- 11039 Kolhapur–Gorakhpur Slip Express.

No slip coach attached/detached at Bhusawal. Passengers who board between Kolhapur & Bhusawal and travelling beyond Bhusawal up to Gorakhpur in S1 coach need to get down at Bhusawal and have to board 15017 at Bhusawal Jn and sit in same berth number of S1 coach. S1 coach of 15017 is reserved for 11039 slip train passengers who board from Bhusawal Jn.

=== Garib Rath/express/mails trains (weekly, biweekly, triweekly) ===
Train name	Departure days	Arrival days
Pune–Manduadih Gyan Ganga Express	Monday	Thursday
CSMT Kolhapur–Hazrat Nizamuddin Superfast Express	Tuesday	Friday
Pune–Darbhanga Gyan Ganga Express	Wednesday	Sunday
Mysore–New Delhi Hazrat Nizamuddin Swarna Jayanti Express	Saturday	Tuesday
Hatia–Pune Superfast Express	Sunday, Wednesday	Tuesday, Saturday
Pune–Nagpur Express	Sunday, Tuesday, Thursday	Sunday, Tuesday, Thursday
Pune–Nagpur Garib Rath Express	Monday, Wednesday, Saturday	Monday, Wednesday, Saturday
Bilaspur–Pune Express	Friday	Friday
Pune–Nanded Superfast Express (via Manmad)	Tuesday, Thursday	Monday, Wednesday
Mysore–Sainagar Shirdi Express	Wednesday	Tuesday
Chennai–Sainagar Shirdi Express	Friday	Thursday
Sainagar Shirdi–Pandharpur Express	Sunday, Tuesday, Thursday	Sunday, Tuesday, Thursday
Yesvantpur–Ahmedabad Weekly Express	Monday	Thursday
Kolhapur–Dhanbad Deekshabhoomi Express	Friday	Wednesday

NOTE: Days of arrival/departure are on Ahmednagar.

=== Passenger trains ===
Train name	Departure days	Arrival days
Daund–Nanded Passenger	Daily	Daily
Pune–Manmad Passenger	Daily	Daily
Pune–Nizamabad Passenger	Daily	Daily
Mumbai CST–Sainagar Shirdi Fast Passenger (via Daund Junction)	Daily	Daily
Ahmednagar-Beed Demu	Monday to Saturday	

NOTE: Days of arrival/departure are on Ahmednagar.

- Mumbai CST–Sainagar Shirdi Fast Passenger is attached to Mumbai–Bijapur/Pandharpur passenger up to Daund.

Preceding station	Indian Railways	Following station
Nimblak towards ?	Central Railway zone Manmad–Daund branch line	Akolner towards ?
