= Mumbai CSMT–Pandharpur Fast Passenger =

Train in India

Dadar – Satara Express
Overview
- Service type: Express
- Current operator: Central Railway

Route
- Termini: Dadar; Pandharpur
- Stops: 27
- Distance travelled: 690 km (429 mi)
- Average journey time: 10h 45m
- Service frequency: Daily
- Train number: 11027/11028

On-board services
- Classes: AC 3 tier, Sleeper Class, General Unreserved
- Seating arrangements: Yes
- Sleeping arrangements: Yes
- Catering facilities: No pantry car but available
- Observation facilities: Rake of Mumbai CST–Sainagar Shirdi Fast Passenger moves together from Daund Junction

Technical
- Rolling stock: Standard Indian Railways coaches
- Track gauge: 1,676 mm (5 ft 6 in)
- Operating speed: 110 km/h (68 mph) maximum 38.72 km/h (24 mph), including halts
Route map
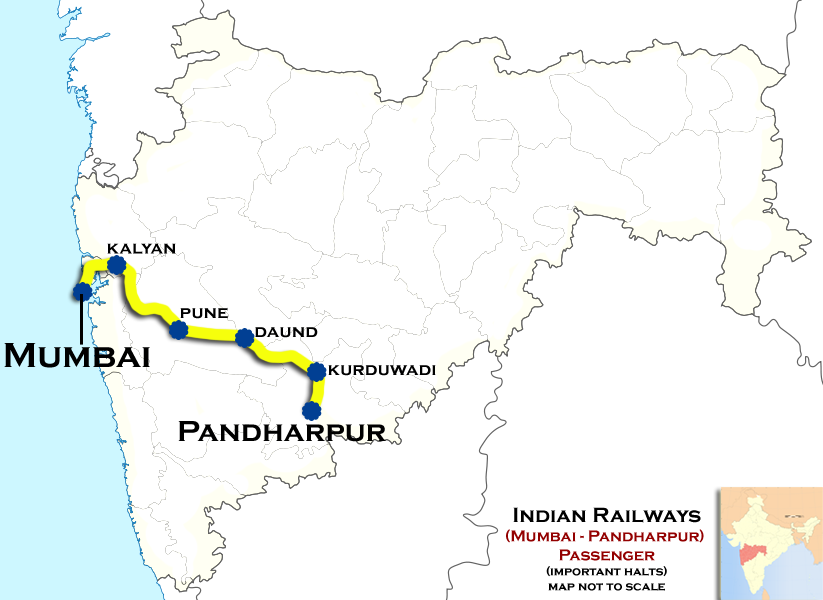

The 11027/11028 Dadar– Satara Express is an express train belonging to Indian Railways that running between Dadar and Satara in India. It operated as train number 11027 from Dadar to Satara and as train number 11028 in the reverse direction. It has been replaced by 11027/11028 Dadar - Pandharpur Express.

== See also ==
- Mumbai–Pune Passenger
- Mumbai CST–Sainagar Shirdi Fast Passenger
