= Mysuru–Ajmer Express =

Train in India

Overview
- Service type: Express
- Locale: Karnataka, Maharashtra, Gujarat & Rajasthan
- Current operator: South Western Railway

Route
- Termini: Mysuru Junction (MYS); Ajmer Junction (AII)
- Stops: 45
- Distance travelled: 2,290 km (1,423 mi)
- Average journey time: 47 hours 05 minutes
- Service frequency: Bi-Weekly
- Train number: 16209 / 16210

On-board services
- Classes: AC First Class, AC 2 Tier, AC 3 Tier, Sleeper Class, General Unreserved
- Seating arrangements: Yes
- Sleeping arrangements: Yes
- Catering facilities: Available
- Observation facilities: Large windows
- Baggage facilities: No
- Other facilities: Below the seats

Technical
- Rolling stock: LHB coach
- Track gauge: 1,676 mm (5 ft 6 in)
- Operating speed: 130 km/h (81 mph) maximum, 48 km/h (30 mph) average including halts.

The 16209 / 16210 Mysuru–Ajmer Express is an express train belonging to Indian Railways–South Western Railway zone that runs between Mysuru Junction and Ajmer Junction in India.

It operates as train number 16209 from Ajmer Junction to Mysuru Junction and as train number 16210 in the reverse direction, serving the states of Karnataka, Maharashtra, Gujarat & Rajasthan.

== Coach composition ==
The train has standard LHB with a max speed of 130 km/h (81 mph). The train consists of 25 coaches:

- 1 AC 1st Class
- 3 AC 2 tier
- 4 AC 3 tier
- 12 Sleeper Class
- 1 Pantry car
- 2 Unreserved/General
- 2 Seating cum Luggage Rake

As with most train services in India, coach composition may be amended at the discretion of Indian Railways depending on demand.

== Service ==
16209/ Ajmer–Mysuru Express covers the distance of 2,290 km (1,423 mi) in 48 hours 30 mins 47.22 km/h (29 mph).

The 16210/ Mysuru–Ajmer Express covers the distance of 2,290 km (1,423 mi) in 47 hours 05 mins 48.64 km/h (30 mph).

As the average speed of the train is below 55 km/h (34 mph), as per Indian Railways rules, its fare does not include a Superfast surcharge.

== Routeing ==
The 16209 / 16210 Mysore–Ajmer Express runs from Mysore Junction via KSR Bengaluru, Hubballi Junction, Miraj Junction, Sangli, Karad, Satara, Pune Junction, Kalyan Junction, Vasai Road, Palghar, Surat, Vadodara Junction, Ahmedabad Junction, Palanpur, Abu Road, Falna, Marwar Junction to Ajmer Junction.

== Schedule ==
Train number	Station code	Departure station	Departure time	Departure day	Arrival station	Arrival time	Arrival day
16209	AII	Ajmer Junction	05:30 AM	Sun, Fri	Mysore Junction	06:00 AM	Tue, Sun
16210	MYS	Mysuru Junction	18:35 PM	Tue, Thu	Ajmer Junction	17:40 PM	Thu, Sat

== Rake sharing ==
The train shares its rake with 16217/16218 Mysuru–Sainagar Shirdi Express.

== Traction ==
As the route is now completely electrified, a Krishnarajapuram Loco Shed-based WAP-7 electric locomotive hauls the train for its entire journey.

== Bibliography ==
- "7 injured as Mysore–Ajmer Express derails – The Times of India". timesofindia.indiatimes.com.
- "Mysore–Ajmer Express derailment: report soon–Indian Express". archive.indianexpress.com.
- "Mysore–Ajmer Express derails near Pune; 4 injured | NDTV.com". ndtv.com.
