= Santragachi–Anand Vihar Superfast Express =

Train in India

Santragachi–Anand Vihar Terminal Superfast Express
Overview
- Service type: Express
- Locale: Delhi, Uttar Pradesh, Bihar, Jharkhand & West Bengal
- First service: 6 January 2015; 11 years ago
- Current operator: South Eastern Railway

Route
- Termini: Santragachi Junction (SRC); Anand Vihar Terminal (ANVT)
- Stops: 9
- Distance travelled: 1,575 km (979 mi)
- Average journey time: 27 hrs 15 mins
- Service frequency: Weekly (Note: Runs one day in a week for every direction.)
- Train number: 22857 / 22858

On-board services
- Classes: AC 2 Tier, AC 3 Tier, Sleeper Class, General Unreserved
- Seating arrangements: No
- Sleeping arrangements: Yes
- Catering facilities: Available
- Observation facilities: Large windows
- Baggage facilities: Available
- Other facilities: Below the seats

Technical
- Rolling stock: LHB coach
- Track gauge: 1,676 mm (5 ft 6 in)
- Operating speed: 58 km/h (36 mph) average including halts.

The 22857 / 22858 Santragachi–Anand Vihar Terminal Superfast Express is an Express train belonging to South Eastern Railway zone that runs between Santragachi Junction and Anand Vihar Terminal in India. It is currently being operated with 22857/22858 train numbers on a weekly basis.

== Service ==
The 22857/Santragachi–Anand Vihar Weekly Superfast Express has an average speed of 58 km/h and covers 1575 km in 27h 15m. The 22858/Anand Vihar–Santragachi Weekly Superfast Express has an average speed of 58 km/h and covers 1575 km in 27h 15m.

== Route and halts ==
The important halts of the train are:

- Santragachi Junction
- Kharagpur Junction
- Tatanagar Junction
- Purulia Junction
- Netaji Subhas Chandra Bose Gomoh
- Gaya Junction
- Pt. Deen Dayal Upadhyaya Junction
- Prayagraj Junction
- Kanpur Central
- Aligarh Junction
- Anand Vihar Terminal

== Coach composition ==
The train has standard LHB rakes with a maximum speed of 130 km/h. The train consists of 18 coaches:

- 1 AC II Tier
- 2 AC III Tier
- 8 Sleeper coaches
- 5 General Unreserved
- 2 End-on Generator

== Traction ==
Both trains are hauled by a Santragachi Loco Shed-based WAP-7 electric locomotive from Santragachi to Anand Vihar Terminal and vice versa.

== Rake sharing ==
The train shares its rake with 22893/22894 Sainagar Shirdi–Howrah Express.

== See also ==
- Anand Vihar Terminal railway station
- Santragachi Junction railway station
- Sainagar Shirdi–Howrah Express
