= Sainagar Shirdi–Howrah Express =

Train in India

Sainagar Shirdi–Howrah Superfast Express

Overview
- Service type: Superfast
- Locale: Maharashtra, Chhattisgarh, Odisha, Jharkhand & West Bengal
- First service: 26 February 2011; 15 years ago
- Current operator: South Eastern Railways

Route
- Termini: Sainagar Shirdi (SNSI); Howrah (HWH)
- Stops: 16
- Distance travelled: 1,791 km (1,113 mi)
- Average journey time: 29 hrs 35 mins
- Service frequency: Weekly
- Train number: 22893 / 22894

On-board services
- Classes: AC 2 tier, AC 3 tier, Sleeper class, General Unreserved
- Seating arrangements: Yes
- Sleeping arrangements: Yes
- Catering facilities: On-board catering E-catering
- Observation facilities: Large windows
- Baggage facilities: Available

Technical
- Rolling stock: LHB coach
- Track gauge: 1,676 mm (5 ft 6 in)
- Operating speed: 60 km/h (37 mph) average including halts
Route map
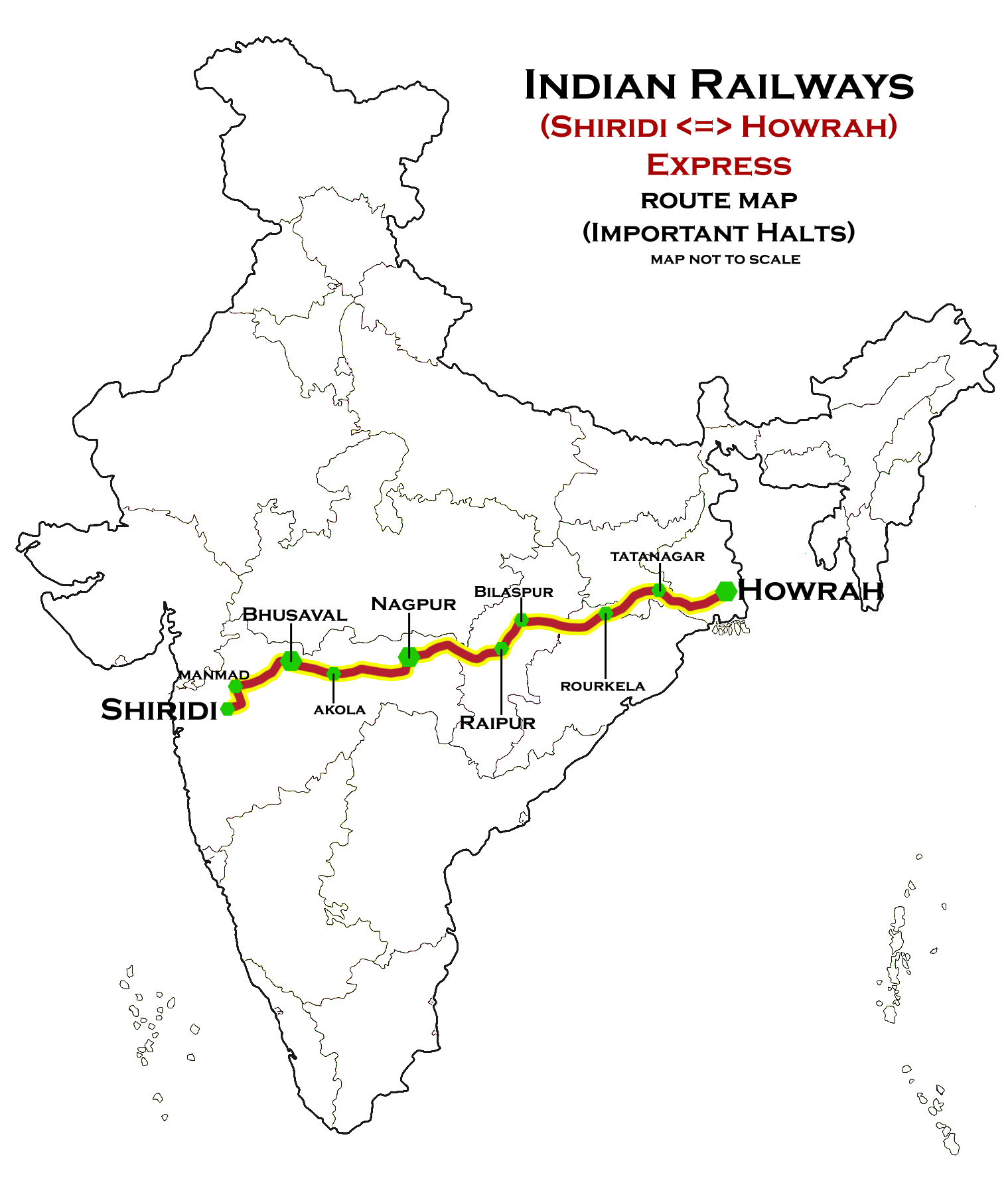

The 22893 / 22894 Sainagar Shirdi–Howrah Superfast Express is an Superfast Express train belonging to South Eastern Railway zone that runs between the city Sainagar Shirdi and Howrah Junction in India.

The Sainagar Shirdi Howrah SF Express leaves Sainagar Shirdi railway station for Howrah railway station, to cover a distance of 1,791 km (1,113 mi) km in 29 hours 35 mins. It had an 1-1 AC 2 & 3-tier and 8 3-tier sleeper. Also, The train is an Express train between Sainagar Shirdi and Howrah in India and other all trains are Superfast Express trains in India.

== History ==
Before it started, there was only one train which connected Sainagar Shirdi to Howrah.

== Accommodations ==
The trains offer four classes of accommodation: second class AC 2-tier (bays of 4 berths + 2 berth on the side) with open system berth, second class AC 3-tier (bays of 6 berths + 2 berths on the side) it also with open system berth and second class 3 tier sleeper (bays of 6 berths + 2 berths on the side). Generally it has 1 AC 2-tiers and 1 AC 3-tiers (both of which may be increased according to demand), it has 8 second class 3 tier sleeper (which may be increased according to demand), it has no pantry car, 5 GEN (unreserved) and 2 SLR (second-class luggage/parcel van) plus a guard van.

== Schedule ==
Train number	Station code	Departure station	Departure time	Departure day	Arrival station	Arrival time	Arrival day
22893	SNSI	Sainagar Shirdi	1:55 PM	Saturday	Howrah (Kolkata)	7:30 PM	Sunday
22894	HWH	Howrah (Kolkata)	2:35 PM	Thursday	Sainagar Shirdi	8:00 PM	Friday

== Route and halts ==
The major stops on the first route are:

- Sainagar Shirdi
- Kopargaon
- Manmad Junction
- Bhusaval Junction
- Akola Junction
- Nagpur Junction
- Gondia Junction
- Durg Junction
- Raipur Junction
- Bilaspur Junction
- Jharsuguda Junction
- Rourkela Junction
- Chakradharpur
- Tatanagar Junction
- Kharagpur Junction
- Howrah

== Traction ==
The train is hauled by a Santragachi-based WAP-7 locomotive from end to end.

== Coach composition ==
Loco	1	2	3	4	5	6	7	8	9	10	11	12	13	14	15	16	17
	SLR	GEN	GEN	B1	A1	S8	S7	S6	S5	S4	S3	S2	S1	GEN	GEN	GEN	SLR

== Rake sharing ==
22857/22858 – Santragachi–Anand Vihar Superfast Express

== See also ==
- Express trains in India
- List of named passenger trains in India
