= Puntamba Junction railway station =

Indian railway station

Puntamba Junction

General information
- Location: Station Road, Puntamba, Maharashtra, India
- Coordinates: 19.7618°N 74.6214°E
- Elevation: 487 m (1,598 ft)
- System: Express train and Passenger train station
- Owner: Indian Railways
- Lines: Daund-Manmad line Puntamba–Shirdi link
- Platforms: 2
- Tracks: 4

Construction
- Parking: Yes

Other information
- Station code: PB
- Division(s): Solapur
- Fare zone: Central Railway zone
Location
- Location within Maharashtra Location within India

Puntamba Junction railway station in Rahata taluka of Ahmednagar district, Maharashtra, India, is a major railway station on the Daund–Manmad branch line and connecting to Sainagar Shirdi railway station.

== Passenger facilities ==
The station has one general waiting room and a food stall.
