= Sainagar Shirdi–Visakhapatnam Express =

Sainagar Shirdi Visakhapatnam Express
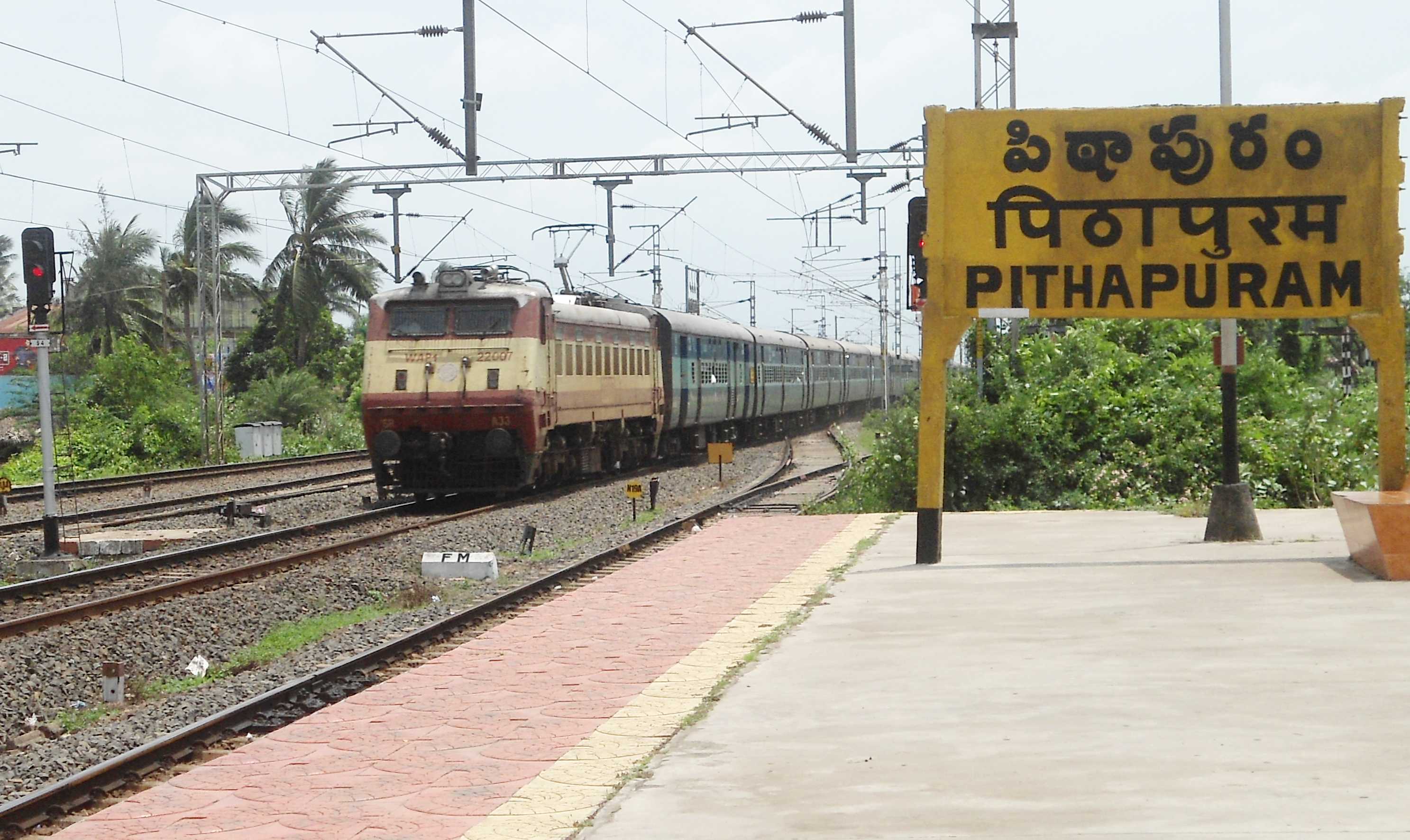
- Visakhapatnam–Sainagar Shirdi Express spotted at Pithapuram train station in 2014

Overview
- Service type: Express
- Locale: Maharashtra, Telangana & Andhra Pradesh
- First service: 5 September 2007; 18 years ago
- Current operator: South Coast Railway zone

Route
- Termini: Sainagar Shirdi; Visakhapatnam
- Stops: 23
- Distance travelled: 1,400 km (870 mi)
- Average journey time: 27 hours 10 mins
- Service frequency: Weekly = 18503 – Thursdays & 18504 – Fridays
- Train number: 18504 / 18503

On-board services
- Classes: AC 2 Tier, AC 3 Tier, Sleeper Class & General Unreserved
- Seating arrangements: Yes
- Sleeping arrangements: Yes
- Catering facilities: No pantry car attached; on-board & e-catering
- Baggage facilities: Under seats

Technical
- Rolling stock: Standard Indian Railways coaches
- Track gauge: 1,676 mm (5 ft 6 in)
- Operating speed: 52 km/h (32 mph)
- Rake sharing: 22869/70 – Visakhapatnam–Chennai Central Express
Route map
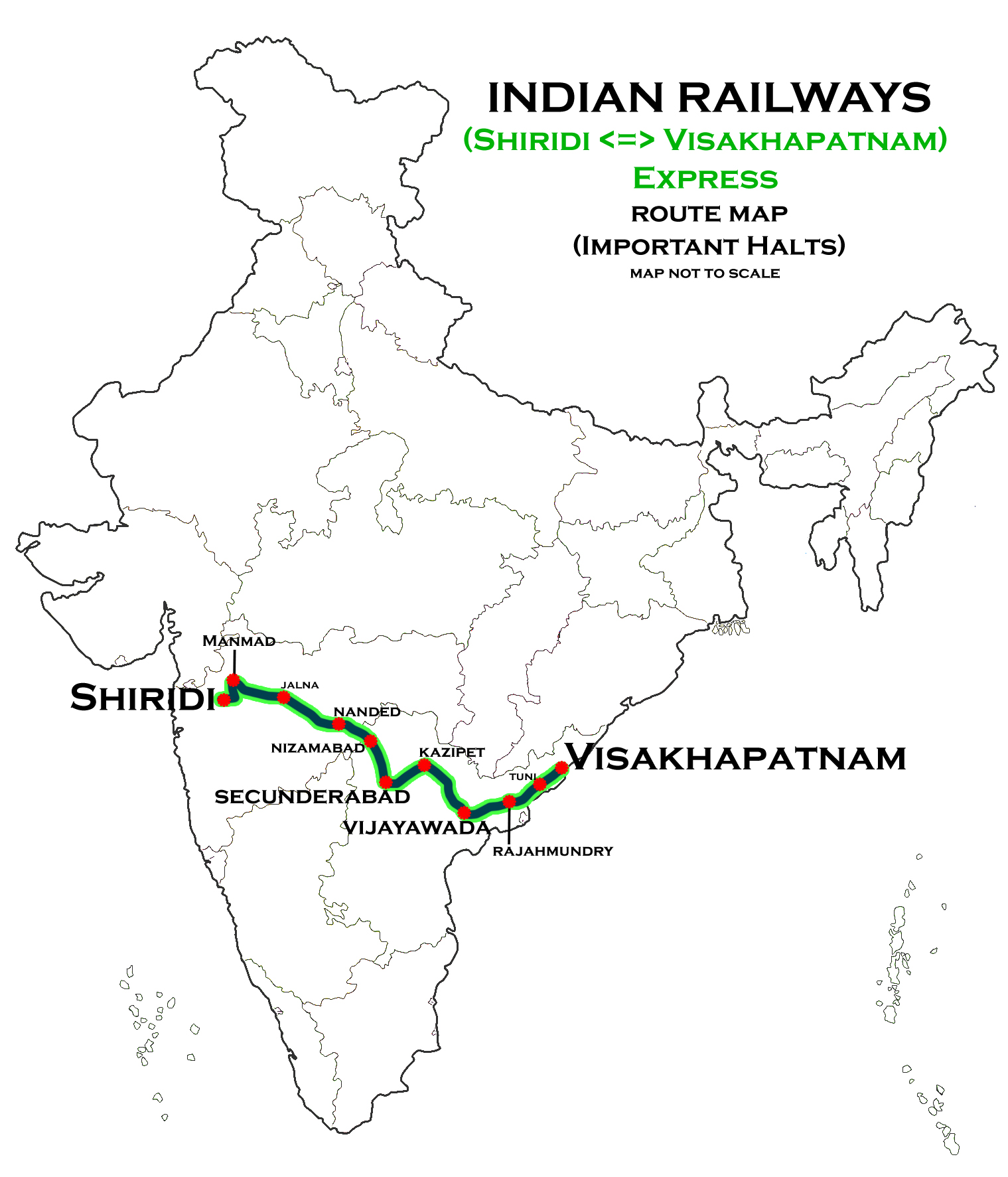

The 18504 / 03 Sainagar Shirdi–Visakhapatnam Express is an Express train belonging to Indian Railways South Coast Railway zone that run between Sainagar Shirdi and Visakhapatnam Junction in India.

== Service ==
It operates as train number 18504 from Sainagar Shirdi to Visakhapatnam and as train number 18503 in the reverse direction serving the states of Maharashtra, Telangana & Andhra Pradesh. The train covers the distance of 1,400 km (870 mi) in 27 hours 15 mins approximately at a speed of (51 km/h (32 mph)).

== Coaches ==
The 18504 / 03 Sainagar Shirdi–Visakhapatnam Express has one AC 2-tier, four AC 3-tier, eight sleeper class, six general unreserved & two SLR (seating with luggage rake) coaches. It does not carry a pantry car.

== Routing and stops ==
- Visakhapatnam
- Duvvada
- Anakapalle
- Elamanchili
- Tuni
- Samalkot
- Rajahmundry
- Eluru
- Tadepalligudem
- Vijayawada
- Khammam
- Warangal
- Kazipet
- Secunderabad
- Kamareddy
- Nizamabad
- Hazur Sahib Nanded
- Purna
- Parbhani
- Jalna
- Aurangabad
- Nagarsol
- Manmad
- Sainagar Shirdi

== Rake sharing ==
This train shares its rake with Visakhapatnam–Chennai Central Express

== Traction ==
As this route is fully electrified, a Vijayawada-based WAP-7 or WAP-4 loco pulls the train to Sainagar Shirdi to Visakhapatnam and vice versa.
