= Mumbai CSMT–Sainagar Shirdi Vande Bharat Express =

Vande Bharat Express train route in India

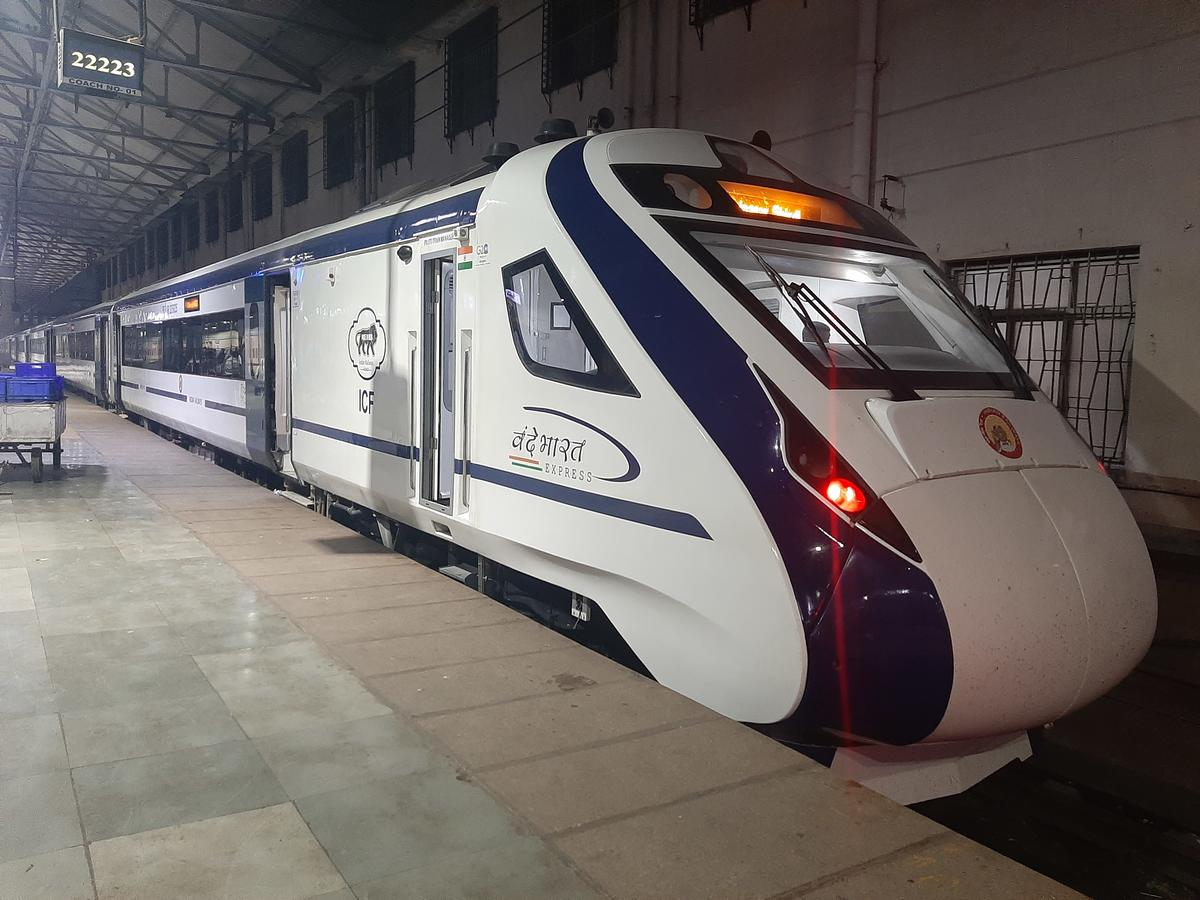

Overview
- Service type: Vande Bharat Express
- Locale: Maharashtra
- First service: 10 February 2023 (Inaugural run); 11 February 2023; 3 years ago (Commercial run)
- Current operator: Central Railways (CR)

Route
- Termini: Mumbai CSMT (CSMT); Sainagar Shirdi Terminus (SNSI)
- Stops: 4
- Distance travelled: 339 km (211 mi)
- Average journey time: 05 hrs 20 mins
- Service frequency: Six days a week (Note: Except Tuesdays)
- Train number: 22223 / 22224
- Line used: Howrah–Nagpur–Mumbai line

On-board services
- Classes: AC Chair Car, AC Executive Chair Car
- Seating arrangements: Airline style; Rotatable seats
- Sleeping arrangements: No
- Catering facilities: On-board catering
- Observation facilities: Large windows in all coaches
- Entertainment facilities: On-board WiFi; Infotainment System; Electric outlets; Reading light; Seat Pockets; Bottle Holder; Tray Table
- Baggage facilities: Overhead racks
- Other facilities: Kavach, Additional Parking brakes and Traction Motor System

Technical
- Rolling stock: Vande Bharat 2.0
- Track gauge: Indian gauge 1,676 mm (5 ft 6 in) broad gauge
- Electrification: 25 kV 50 Hz AC Overhead line
- Operating speed: 130 km/h (81 mph)
- Average length: 384 metres (1,260 ft) (16 coaches)
- Track owner: Indian Railways
- Rake maintenance: Wadi Bunker Yard (CSMT)

The 22223/22224 Mumbai CSMT–Sainagar Shirdi Vande Bharat Express is India's 10th Vande Bharat Express train, running across the state of Maharashtra.

== Overview ==
This train is operated by Indian Railways, connecting Mumbai CSMT, Dadar Ctrl, Thane, Kalyan Jn, Nashik Road and Sainagar Shirdi Terminus. It is currently operated with train numbers 22223/22224 on 6 days a week basis.

== Rakes ==
It is the eighth 2nd Generation Vande Bharat Express train and was designed and manufactured by the Integral Coach Factory (ICF) under the leadership of Sudhanshu Mani at Perambur, Chennai under the Make in India initiative.

== Service ==
The 22223/22224 Mumbai CSM Trm - Sainagar Shirdi Vande Bharat Express operates six days a week except Tuesdays, covering a distance of 343 km (213 mi) in a travel time of 5 hours with an average speed of 66 km/h (41 mph). The service has 4 intermediate stops. The Maximum Permissible Speed is 130 km/h (81 mph).

== See also ==
- Vande Bharat Express
- Tejas Express
- Gatimaan Express
- Mumbai CSMT Terminus
- Sainagar Shirdi Terminus
