= Mumbai CSMT–Sainagar Shirdi Fast Passenger =

Train in India

Mumbai Chhatrapati Shivaji Maharaj Terminus - Sainagar Shirdi Fast Passenger
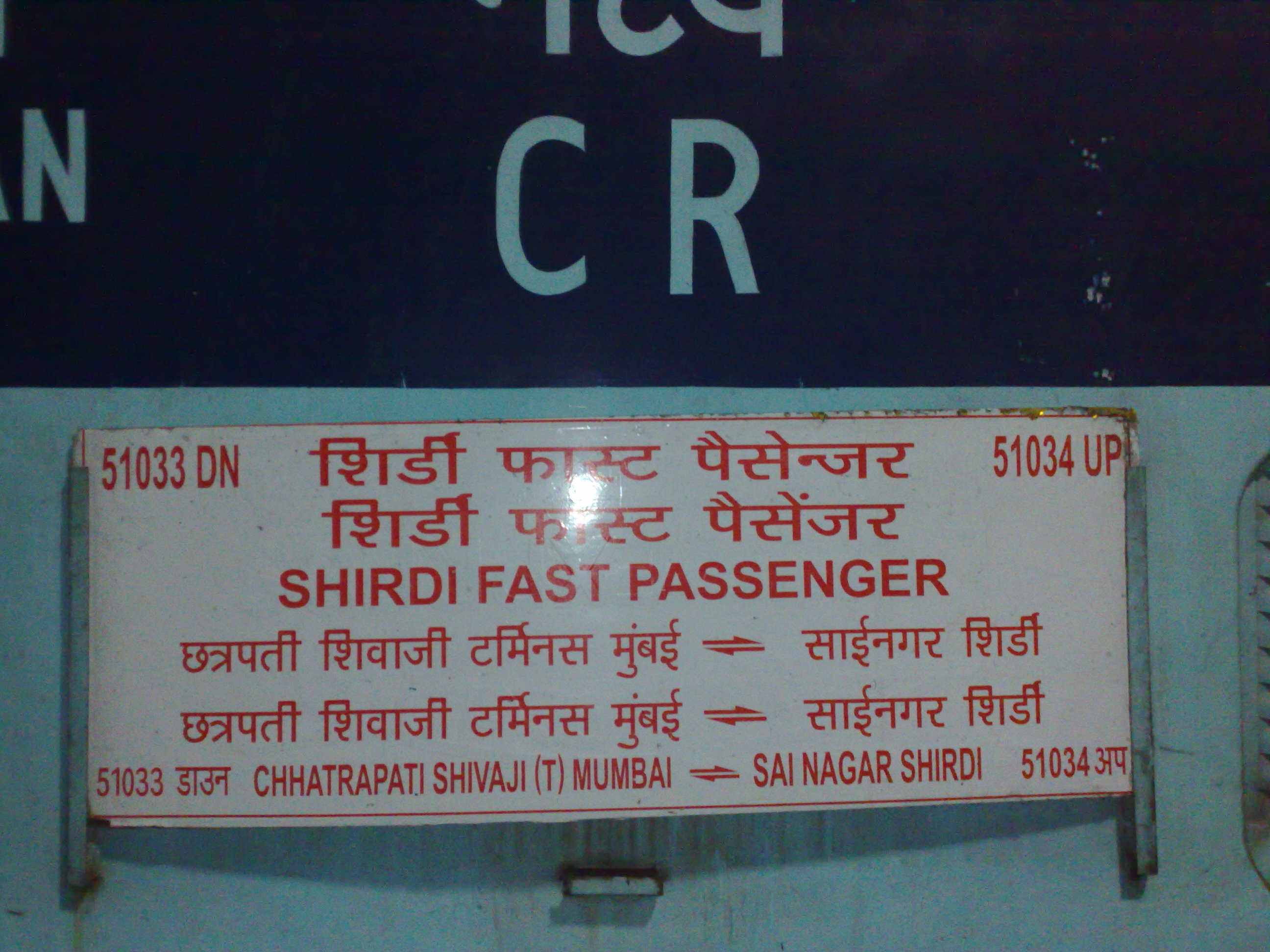

Overview
- Service type: Express
- Locale: Maharashtra
- Current operator: Central Railway

Route
- Termini: Chhatrapati Shivaji Maharaj Terminus; Sainagar Shirdi
- Stops: 27 as 51033 Shirdi Fast Passenger, 30 as 51034 Shirdi CST Fast Passenger
- Distance travelled: 455 km (283 mi)
- Average journey time: 12 hours 00 minutes as 51033 Shirdi Fast Passenger, 11 hours 30 minutes as 51034 Shirdi CSMT Fast Passenger
- Service frequency: Daily
- Train number: 51033/51034

On-board services
- Classes: AC 3 tier, Sleeper Class, General Unreserved
- Seating arrangements: Yes
- Sleeping arrangements: Yes
- Catering facilities: No Pantry Car but Available
- Observation facilities: Rake of Mumbai CSMT - Pandharpur Fast Passenger Passenger moves together until Daund Junction

Technical
- Rolling stock: Standard Indian Railways coaches
- Track gauge: 1,676 mm (5 ft 6 in)
- Operating speed: 110 km/h (68 mph) maximum 38.72 km/h (24 mph), including halts

The 51033/51034 Mumbai Chhatrapati Shivaji Maharaj Terminus - Sainagar Shirdi Fast Passenger was an express train belonging to Indian Railways that ran between Mumbai CSMT and Sainagar Shirdi in India. It operated as train number 51033 from Mumbai CSMT to Sainagar Shirdi and as train number 51034 in the reverse direction. It has been replaced by 11041/11042 Dadar - Sainagar Shirdi Express.

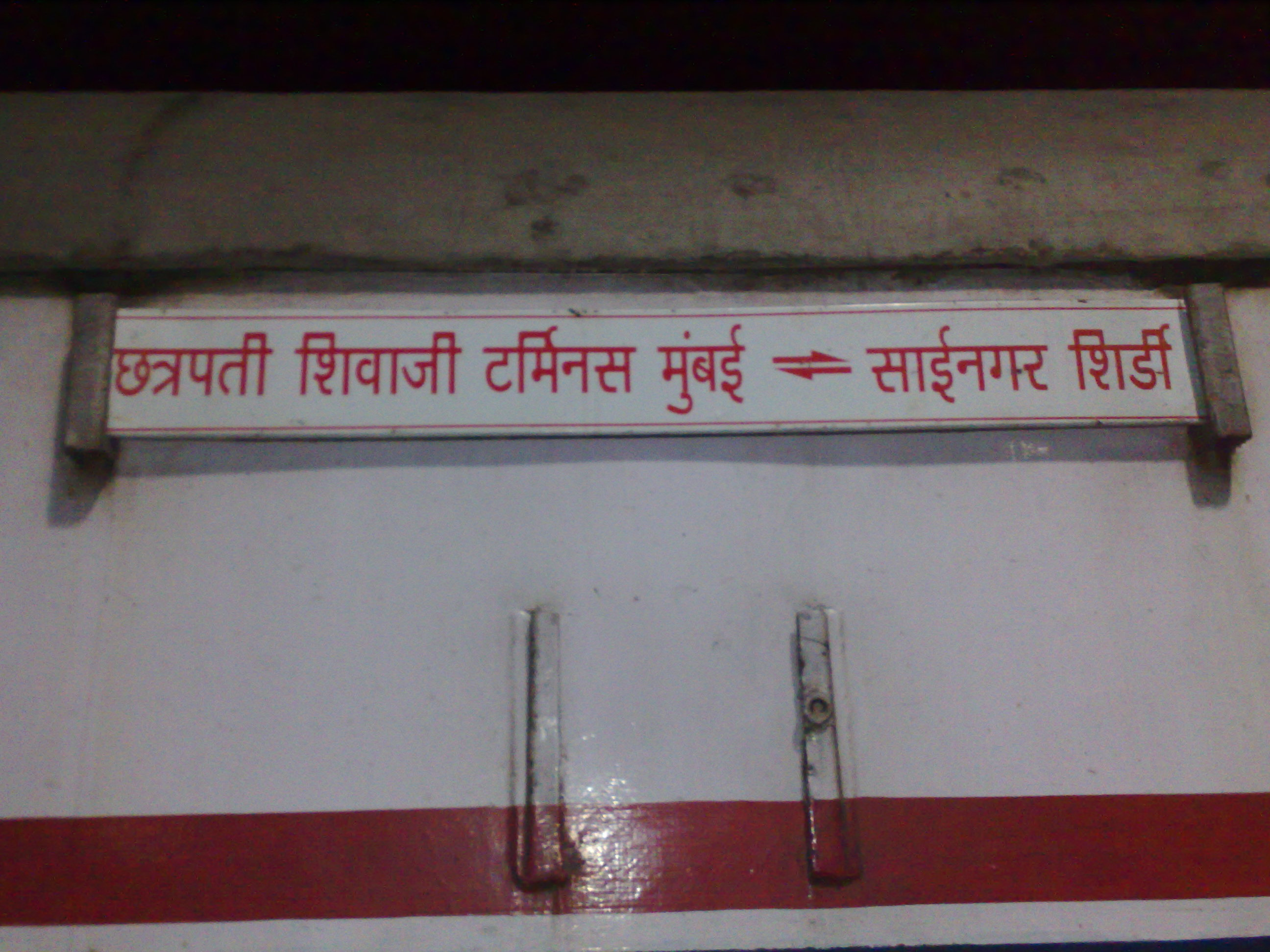
Shirdi Fast Passenger - Destination board

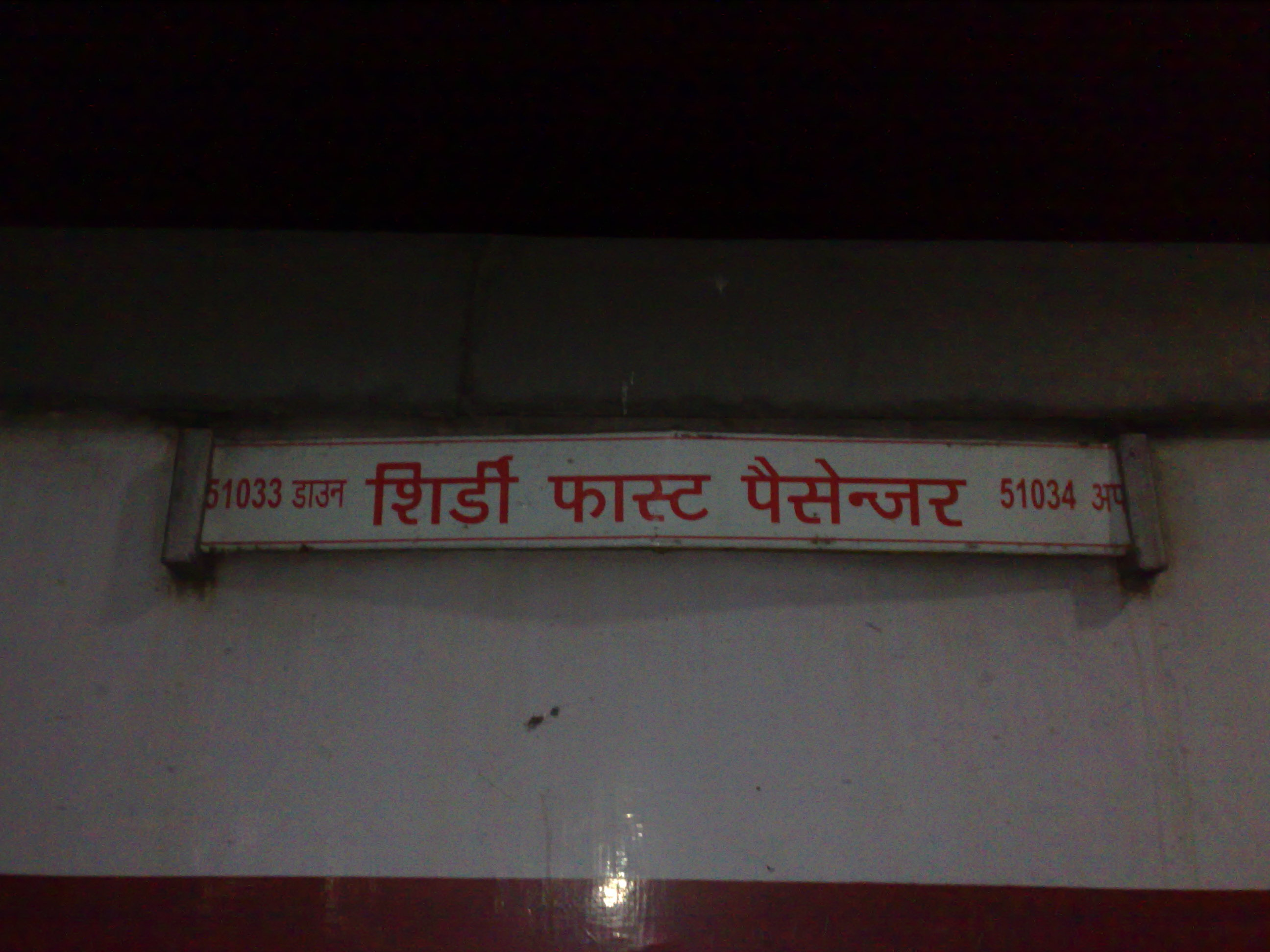
Shirdi Fast Passenger - Coachboard

== See also ==
- Mumbai-Pune Passenger
- Mumbai CST - Pandharpur Fast Passenger
