= Daund Chord Line railway station =

Railway station in Maharashtra, India

Daund Chord Line

General information
- Location: New Daund, Pune district, Maharashtra; India
- Coordinates: 18.4671°N 74.5535°E
- Elevation: 514 metres (1,686 ft)
- System: Express train and Passenger train station
- Owner: Indian Railways
- Operator: Central Railway
- Lines: On bypass line joining Mumbai–Chennai line and Daund–Manmad branch line
- Platforms: 1
- Tracks: 2

Construction
- Structure type: Standard on ground
- Parking: Yes
- Cycle facilities: Yes

Other information
- Status: Functioning
- Station code: DDCC
- Zone(s): Central Railway zone
- Division(s): Pune

History
- Opened: 2020; 6 years ago
Location
- Location within Maharashtra Location within India

Daund Cord Line railway station is a railway station on bypass line joining Mumbai–Chennai line and Daund–Manmad branch line, located in Pune district, Maharashtra, India. It is also a junction station, although it is not named so.

== History ==
The Pune–Raichur sector of the Mumbai–Chennai line was opened in stages: the portion from Pune to Barshi Road was opened in 1859, from Barshi Road to Mohol in 1860 and from Mohol to Solapur also in 1860. Work on the line from Solapur southwards began in 1865, and the line was extended to Raichur in 1871.

Daund station was established in 1858 or 1859, the Daund-Baramati metre-gauge track was constructed in 1906. Daund became a junction after the broad-gauge Daund-Manmad track was built. Daund got connected to Srigonda by road when in 1928 the bridge over river Bhima was constructed.

Before establishment of Daund Chord Line railway station, trains from Pune, Goa, Hubli, etc, and going to Delhi, Howrah, etc had to get their engines reversed in opposite direction at Daund Junction, which was a very time-consuming process. To avoid this problem, a new station for halting such trains was established in 2020, named Daund Chord Line. Since then, trains running on above routes halt at Daund Chord Line, bypassing Daund Junction.

== Amenities ==
Daund Chord Line railway station has no amenities.
