= Belapur (BAP) railway station =

Railway station in Maharashtra

Coordinates: 19.6198°N 74.6598°E

Belapur railway station

General information
- Location: Shrirampur, Ahmednagar district, Maharashtra; India
- Elevation: 534.850 metres (1,754.76 ft)
- System: Indian Railways station
- Owner: Indian Railways
- Operator: Central Railway zone
- Line: Pune to Manmad
- Platforms: 2
- Tracks: 3 Working

Construction
- Structure type: Standard (on-ground station)
- Parking: Yes
- Cycle facilities: Yes

Other information
- Status: Functional
- Station code: BAP
- Zone(s): Central Railways
- Division(s): Solapur
Location

Belapur railway station is a railway station in Ahmednagar district in the Indian state of Maharashtra on the Central Railways network. Its code is BAP. It is one of the main stations in Ahmednagar as many passengers come here to go to shirdi.

It is located about 37 km away from Sainagar Shirdi railway station.

This station also has a Non-AC Retiring room, and it is maintained well.

== Location ==
Although the station name is Belapur, it is located in the city named Shrirampur.

== Trains ==
=== Towards Pune ===
Trains towards Daund
Train No	Train Name	Runs on	Time
12130	Howrah - Pune Azad Hind Express	All Days	2:45 AM
11078	Jammu Tawi - Pune Jhelum Express	All Days	11:30 AM
12780	H. Nizamuddin (Delhi) - Wasco da Gama Goa Express	All Days	1:00 PM
51422	Nizamabad - Pune Passenger	All Days	2:00 PM
12628	New Delhi - Bengaluru Karnataka Express	All Days	5:30 PM
11040	Gondia - Kolhapur Maharashtra Express	All Days	11:00 PM
12150	Danapur - Pune Express	All Days	11:30 PM
11034	Darabhanga - Pune Express	Sunday	3:00 AM
12136	Nagpur - Pune Express	Sunday, Tuesday, Thursday	4:30 AM
11042	Shirdi - Mumbai (Dadar) Express	Sunday, Wednesday, Thursday, Friday	9:15 PM
12730	Nanded - Pune (Hadapsar) Express	Monday, Wednesday	3:00 AM
12782	H. Nizamuddin (Delhi) - Mysuru Express (Via Pune)	Tuesday	2:15 AM
16218	Shirdi - Mysuru Express (Via Solapur)	Wednesday	1:00 AM
16501	Yashwantpur - Ahmedabad Express	Wednesday	8:45 AM
22132	Banaras - Pune Dyanganga Express	Thursday	3:00 AM
12148	H. Nizamuddin (Delhi) - Kolhapur Express	Friday	2:15 AM
12849	Bilaspur - Pune Express	Friday	4:30 AM

=== Towards Manmad ===
Trains towards Manmad
Train No	Train Name	Runs on	Time
12149	Pune - Danapur Express	All Days	12:30 AM
11039	Kolhapur - Gondia Maharashtra Express	All Days	2:30 AM
12779	Wasco - H. Nizamuddin (Delhi) Goa Express	All Days	8:30 AM
12627	Bangaluru - New Delhi Karnataka Express	All Days	1:00 PM
51421	Pune - Nizamabad Passenger	All Days	8:00 PM
11077	Pune - Jammu Tawi Jhelum Express	All Days	9:00 PM
12129	Pune - Howrah Azad Hind Express	All Days	10:30 PM
12135	Pune - Nagpur Express	Sunday, Tuesday, Thursday	9:30 PM
11041	Mumbai (Dadar) - Shirdi Express	Sunday, Wednesday, Thursday, Friday	7:30 AM
16502	Ahmedabad - Yashvantpur Express	Monday	9:30 AM
22131	Pune - Banaras Dyanganga Express	Monday	8:00 PM
16217	Mysuru - Shirdi Express (Via Solapur)	Tuesday	9:30 AM
12147	Kolhapur - H. Nizamuddin (Delhi) Express	Tuesday	8:00 PM
12729	Pune (Hadapsar) - Nanded Express	Tuesday, Thursday	1:45 AM
11033	Pune - Darbhanga Express	Wednesday	8:00 PM
12850	Pune - Bilaspur Express	Friday	9:30 PM
12781	Mysuru - H. Nizamuddin (Delhi) Express (Via Pune)	Saturday	8:00 PM
