= Puntamba =

- town
- Location in Maharashtra, India
- Coordinates: 19°45′N 74°38′E
- Country: India
- State: Maharashtra
- District: Ahmednagar

Languages
  - Official: Marathi
- Time zone: UTC+5:30 (IST)

Puntamba is a market town situated on the banks of the Godavari River in Rahata taluka, Ahmednagar District in the state of Maharashtra in India. The village contains the 14th and the final resting place of the sage Changdev. The town is known for old temples and traditional schools that specialize in study of the Hindu scriptures or the Vedas.

== History of name ==
The village has history going back to the Shalivahana. It is believed that the name of the village was formed by merging the two towns Punyastambha and Tambilindanapur.

== Town layout ==
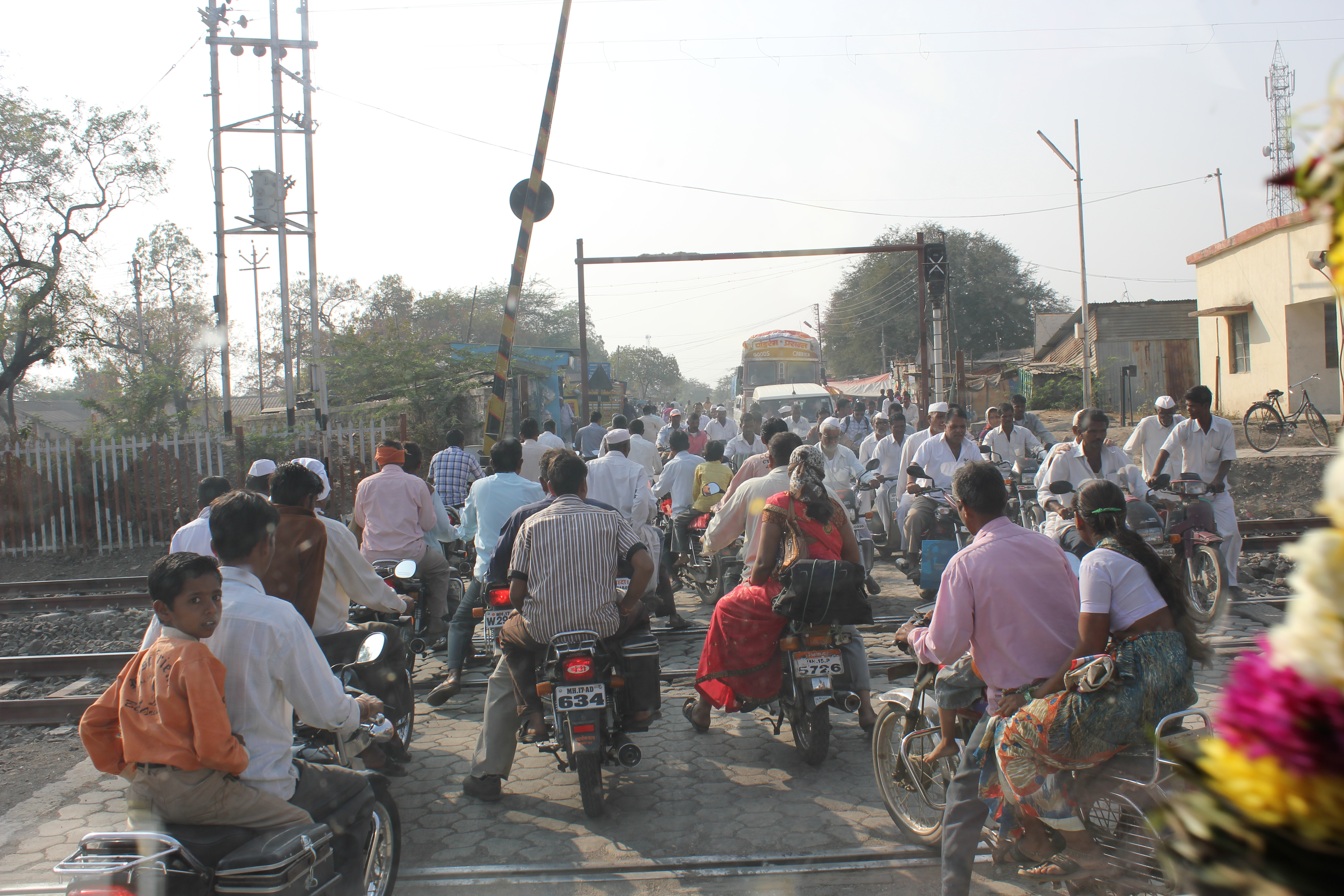
A Busy Railway Crossing in Puntamba

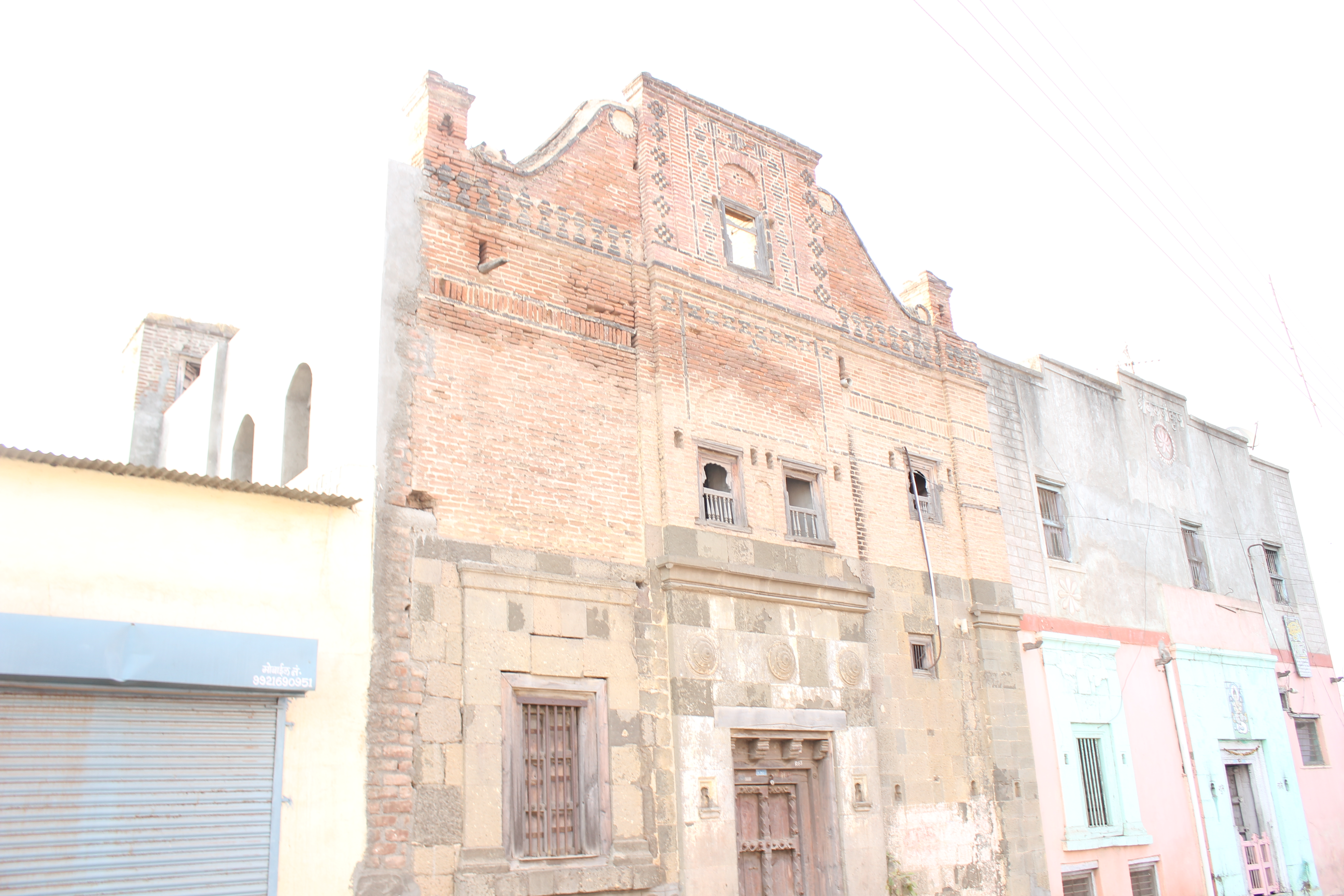
A Traditional Wada in Puntamba

.

The town is situated on the banks of the Godavari river. The 18th century ruler of Indore, Ahilyabai Holkar an embankment or ghat on the river. The old town is enclosed by a Defensive wall (or Tatabandi) which was built by the Patwardhan ruling family of Jamkhandi, but has fallen into disrepair. From a similar era there are also numerous traditional houses with large enclosed courtyards (or vada). The Village is served by a rail link between Manmad and Daund. Puntamba station also serves as a junction for trains going to Shirdi, a short distance away.

== Economy and culture ==
Per the 2001 Census of India, the population of the village was 12425 with 6366 males and 6059 females. Puntamba is a Market Town with a weekly market held on every Monday. It is located twelve miles south-east of Kopargaon, the taluka (district sub-division) headquarters with a railway station on the Daund-Manmad railway line and a railway spur connecting it with the town of Shirdi which attracts pilgrims from all over India to the shrine of Saibaba.

In modern times, large number of residents of the town are involved in farming of Cash crops such as sugarcane. The main source of water-supply for farming is, of course, the Godavari river and wells. The town is electrified. The Chandeo Sugar factory has been operating in the area since 1939.

Facilities and businesses in the town include a ST bus-stand, a post office, two commercial banks, six credit co-operative societies, and a godown for storing grains. There is also a veterinary dispensary. There are seven Doctor's offices. The educational institutions include an agricultural school with 200 acres of land, five primary schools, two high schools including New English School, and three libraries. Cultural or religious facilities in the town include a traditional gym called akhada or talim, two dharmashalas (Hindu pilgrim lodges), three maths (Hindu Monasteries), a Christian church, a dargah (tomb of a Sufi saint) and four mosques.

=== Hindu religious institutions, places of worship and pilgrimage ===
View of Puntamba, a town of Temples, You Can see Temples as well as Railway Bridge on Godavari.

The Godavari river is sacred to Hindus and has several places on its banks, that have been places of pilgrimage for thousands of years. Puntamba is one of them. On the bank of the Godavari in town, there are low flights of steps or ghats to the water, one of which was built by Ahilyabai Holkar, the great temple-building ruler of Indore (1765–1795) and another by one Shri Shivram Dhumal.

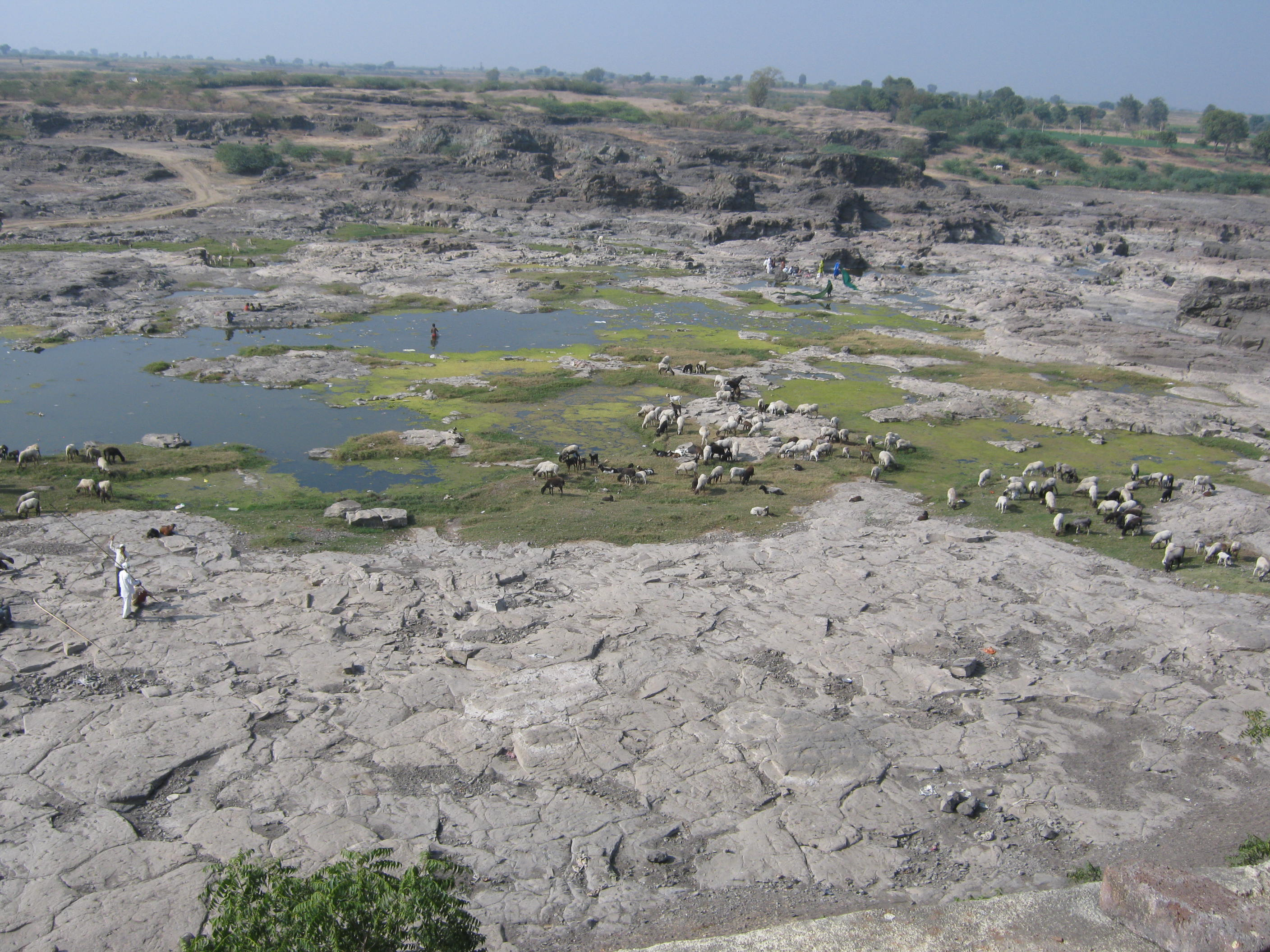
Dried up Godavari as seen from the Changdeo temple

The place has sixteen temples of Maruti, six temples of Mahadev including one of Kashi Vishweshvar, temple of Kalbhairav, three temples of Vitthal, two temples of Datta, and one each of Laxmi-Narayan and Changdeo Maharaj.

==== Changdeo Temple ====
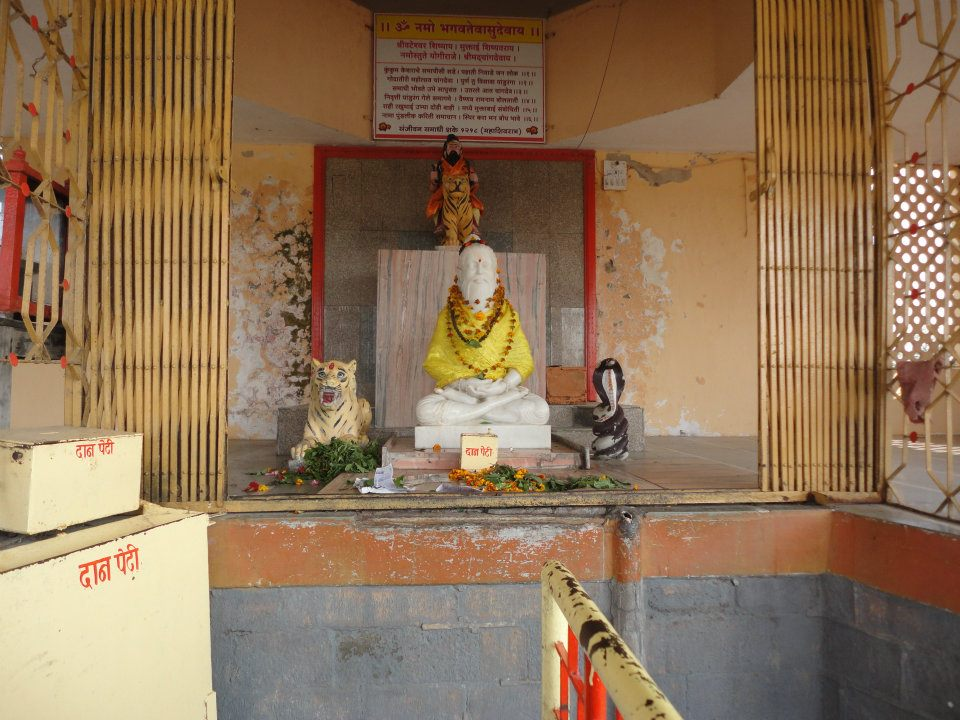
Chagdeo Samdahi Facing the Godavari River

The main temple in Puntamba is that of Changdev, a famous saint said to have lived for 1,400 years. It is stated that the saint used to absorb himself in devout contemplation after every hundred years at different places, Puntamba being the last place where he had his fourteenth meditation. There is a legend about Changdeo who, it is said, was very proud of his supernatural powers. He went to visit Dnyaneshwar, the noted saint-poet, by riding on a tiger, and using a poisonous cobra as a whip. The saint decided to humiliate Changdev by deriding his supernatural powers and made the inanimate masonry wall on which he was sitting with his brothers and sister move to meet the approaching Changdev. On seeing this strange spectacle Changdev lost all his pride, bowed in submission to Dnyaneshvar and asked for his forgiveness.

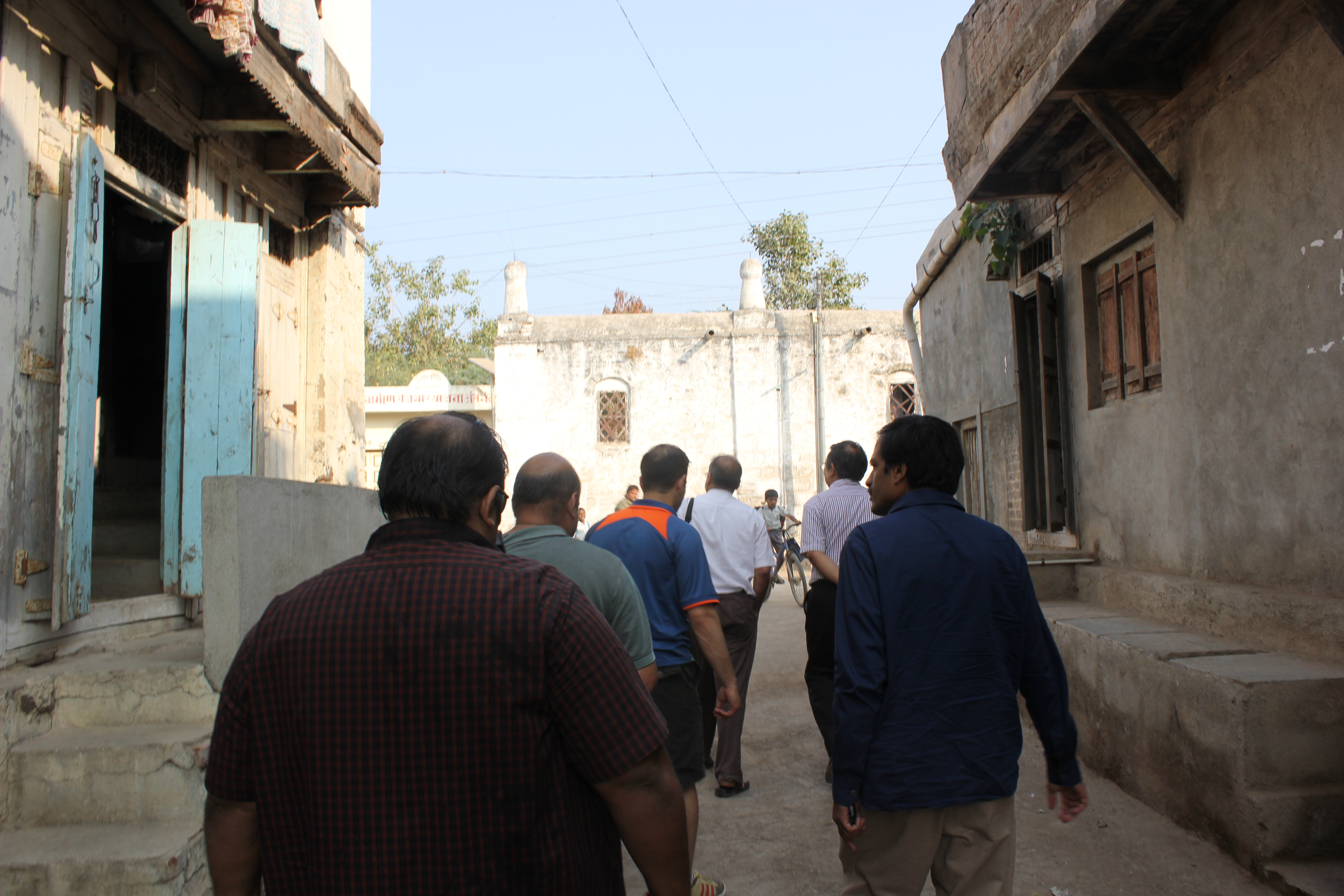
An Old Street in Puntamba

The main temple of Changdev was built in the mid-1600s. Though very old, the temple of Changdev Maharaj is a simple structure with a mandap of 50'x30', open on all sides and covered with a roof of corrugated iron sheets having slope on four sides supported by a wooden frame and ten uncarved wooden pillars about eight feet in height. There is a small quadrangular gabhara wherein small idols of Vitthal and Rakhumai of black stone, facing east are placed. One can enter the gabhara (Inner sanctum) through a small door. However, one cannot see the samadhi (tomb) of Changdev which is just behind the backwall of the inner sanctum. The samadhi is built in well-dressed black stone in a quadrangular form of 6'x4' and paved with marbles, at the centre of which two foot-prints of marble are placed on a little raised platform under a small dome of about 4 feet in height. One has to ascend a flight of steps to see the foot-prints. The temple including the samadhi is surrounded by a wall 100'X70' built in mud and stone at a distance of about 10' on all the sides of the temple. The Godavari river which flows to the west of the temple provides a delightful scenic background during the monsoon season (June–October) but is reduced to a trickle by January. The temple holds its annual fair in Kartik (October–November). It is attended by about twenty-five thousand people from all over the district.

== Farmers’ strike ==
In 2017, the idea of a farmers’ strike was born in Puntamba. On April 3, 2017, the village panchayat assembly passed the resolution to strike on 1 June 2017. Farmers had decided to cut off food and milk supplies to cities or sow the Kharif crops. The main demands of the farmers were implementation of the MS Swaminathan committee's recommendation, a loan waiver, better prices for milk, and pensions for farmers. The strike achieved immediate impact through the use of social media, which led to statewide agitation and further triggered agitation in several other states. After meeting with farmers’ representatives, the Government of Maharashtra announced a loan waiver scheme.

== Notable people ==
- Padmanabha Tirtha, direct disciple of Madhvacharya, founder of Dvaita Vedanta
- Vidyadhisha Tirtha, 16th century Hindu saint and 16th peetadhipathi of Uttaradi Math of Dvaita Vedanta.
- Satyanidhi Tirtha, 17th century Hindu Saint and 19th peetadhipathi of Uttaradi Math of Dvaita Vedanta.
- Ramchandra N. Chitalkar, (popularly known as C. Ramchandra), the Hindi film music director who composed many all time favourites of the 1940s & 1950s.
