= Dadar–Sainagar Shirdi Superfast Express =

Train in India

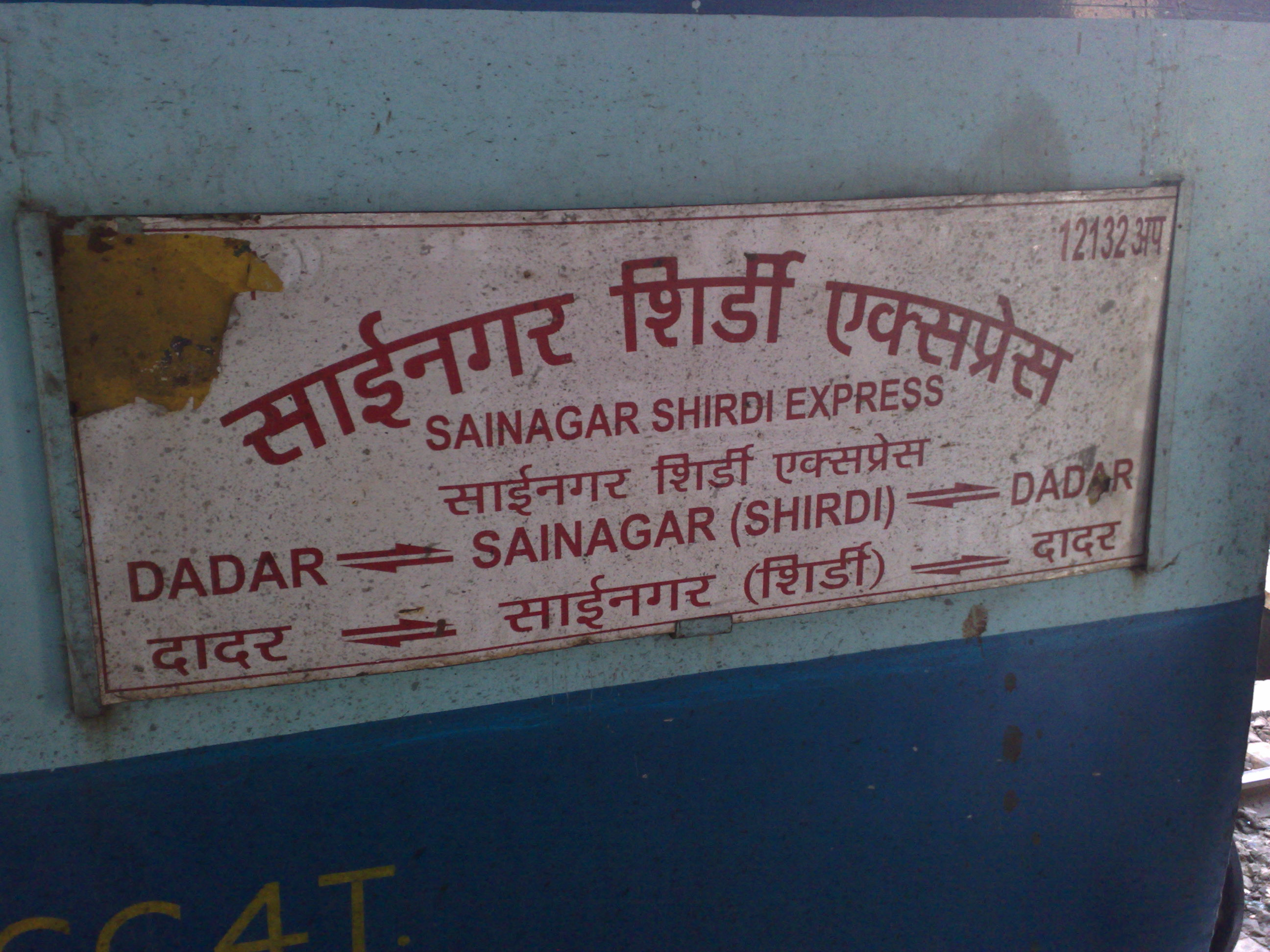

Overview
- Service type: Superfast Express
- Locale: Maharashtra
- First service: 28 August 2010
- Current operator: Central Railways

Route
- Termini: Dadar; Sainagar Shirdi
- Stops: 8
- Distance travelled: 336 km (209 mi)
- Average journey time: 6 hours
- Service frequency: Tri-weekly
- Train number: 12131 / 12132

On-board services
- Classes: AC 2 tier, AC 3 tier, Sleeper class, General Unreserved
- Seating arrangements: Yes
- Sleeping arrangements: Yes
- Catering facilities: Not available
- Observation facilities: Large windows

Technical
- Rolling stock: Standard Indian Railways coaches
- Track gauge: 1,676 mm (5 ft 6 in)
- Operating speed: 55.16 km/h (34 mph), including halts
Route map
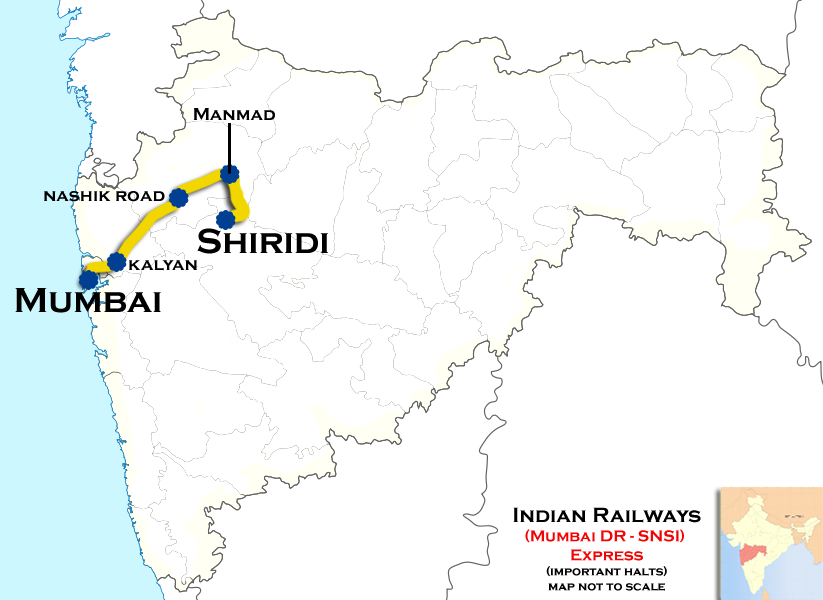

The 12131/12132 Dadar–Sainagar Shirdi Superfast Express is a Superfast Express train belonging to Indian Railways that run between Mumbai and Shirdi in India. It operates as train number 12131 from Dadar to Sainagar Shirdi and as train number 12132 in the reverse direction.

== Coaches ==
12131/12132 Dadar–Sainagar Shirdi Superfast Express presently has 1 AC 2 tier, 1 AC 3 tier, 7 Sleeper class & 9 General Unreserved coaches. As with most train services in India, coach composition may be amended at the discretion of Indian Railways depending on demand.

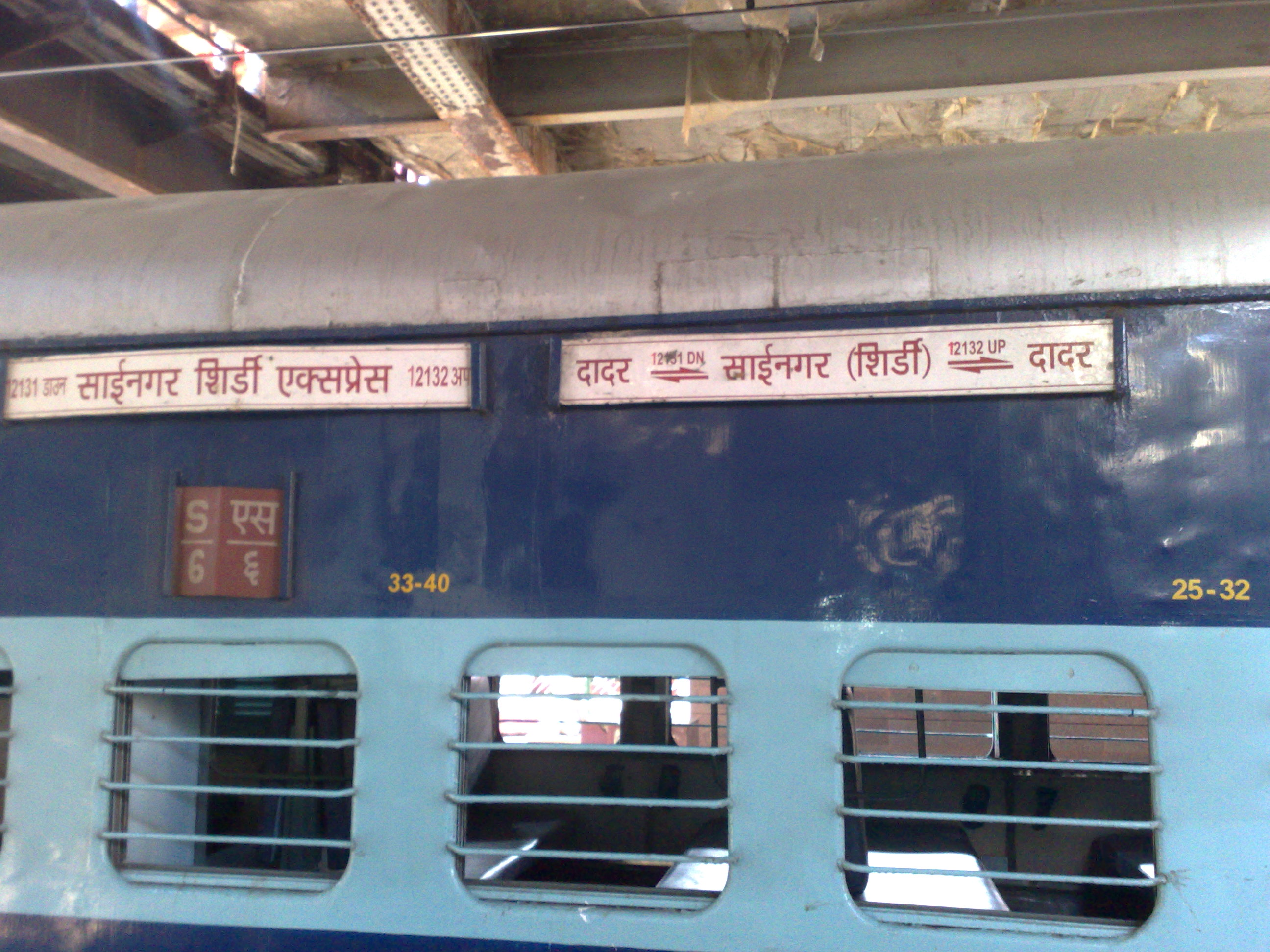
Dadar–Sainagar Shirdi Superfast Express – Sleeper class coach

== Service ==
12131 Dadar–Sainagar Shirdi Superfast Express covers the distance of 336 kilometres in 6 hours 6 mins (55.08 km/h) and 6 hours 5 mins as 12132 Sainagar Shirdi–Dadar Superfast Express (55.23 km/h). As the average speed of the train is above 55 km/h, as per Indian Railways rules, its fare includes a Superfast surcharge.
