= Sainagar Shirdi railway station =

Train station in Maharashtra, India

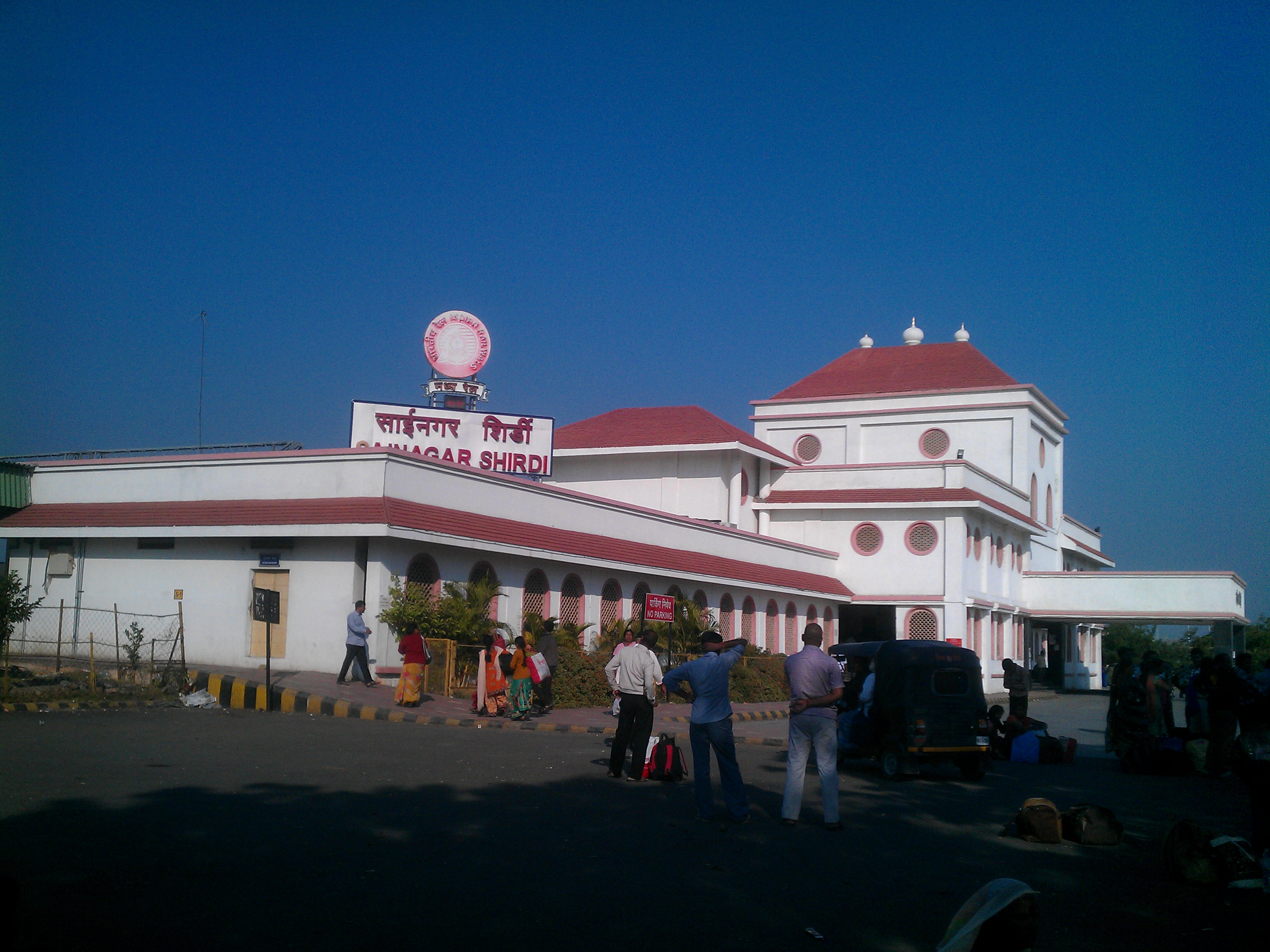
- Sainagar Shirdi

General information
- Location: Shirdi, Ahmednagar district, Maharashtra; India
- Coordinates: 19°46′50.73″N 74°28′48.5″E
- Elevation: 504 metres (1,654 ft)
- System: Indian Railways station
- Owner: Ministry of Railways (India)
- Operator: Indian Railways
- Line: Daund–Manmad branch line
- Platforms: 4
- Tracks: 5
- Connections: Buses, Taxi stand, Prepaid auto service

Construction
- Structure type: Standard on ground
- Parking: Yes
- Accessible: Yes

Other information
- Status: Functioning (Wi-fi Enabled)
- Station code: SNSI
- Zone(s): Central Railway zone
- Division(s): Pune

History
- Opened: 2009
- Electrified: 2011–12
Location
- Location within Maharashtra Location within India

Sainagar Shirdi railway station (station code: SNSI) is a railway station serving the town of Shirdi, Maharashtra. Sainagar Shirdi is a railway terminus and belongs to Central Railways of Indian Railways.

== History ==
Work began in 2003, and the railway station opened in 2009.

The Manmad–Puntamba-Sainagar Shirdi is a broad-gauge line which was electrified in 2011–12.

== Trains ==
1. 22147 Dadar Central–Sainagar Shirdi Weekly Superfast Express
2. 17207 Sainagar Shirdi–Vijayawada Express (Wednesday) via Secunderabad
3. 17001 Sainagar Shirdi–Secunderabad Express via Bidar (Monday and Saturday)
4. 17205 Sainagar Shirdi–Kakinada Port Express via Secunderabad (Sunday, Tuesday and Thursday)
5. 51034 Mumbai CST–Sainagar Shirdi Fast Passenger via Daund
6. 22602 Sainagar Shirdi-Chennai Central SuperFast Express (Friday) via Yelahanka, Krishnarajapuram (Bangalore), Daund
7. 22893 Sainagar Shirdi – Howrah SuperFast Express Via Nagpur (Saturday)
8. 18504 Sainagar Shirdi–Visakhapatnam Express via Kazipet(Friday)
9. 12131 Dadar Central–Sainagar Shirdi Superfast Express via Nasik (Sunday, Tuesday and Thursday)
10. 16218 Mysore–Sainagar Shirdi Express via Bangalore, Daund (Tuesday)
11. 22455 Sainagar Shirdi–Kalka Express via Bhopal –Agra–New Delhi (Tuesday & Saturday)
12. 20857 Puri–Sainagar Shirdi Weekly Superfast Express via Manmad–Bhusawal–Nagpur–Raipur–Bhubaneswar (Sunday)
13. 17418 Tirupati–Sainagar Shirdi Express via Manmad Secunderabad
14. 11001 Sainagar Shirdi–Pandharpur Express
15. 77657 Jalna–Sainagar Shirdi DEMU
16. 22224 Sainagar Shirdi - Mumbai CSMT Vande Bharat Express
