= Kopargaon railway station =

Railway station in Maharashtra, India

Kopargaon

General information
- Location: Kopargaon, Ahmednagar district, Maharashtra; India
- Coordinates: 19.9034°N 74.5035°E
- Elevation: 508 m (1,667 ft)
- Operator: Indian Railways; Central Railway Zone
- Platforms: 2
- Tracks: 2

Other information
- Status: Active
- Station code: KPG
Location
- Location within India Location within Maharashtra

Kopargaon railway station (station code: KPG) is a railway station serving Kopargaon town, in Ahmednagar district of Maharashtra State of India. It is under Solapur railway division of Central Railway Zone of Indian Railways.

It is located at 508 m above sea level and has two platforms. As of 2016, an electrified single broad gauge railway line exists and at this station, 74 trains stop. Shirdi Airport is at distance of 20 kilometers.
