= Daund Junction railway station =

Railway station in Pune district, India

Daund Junction
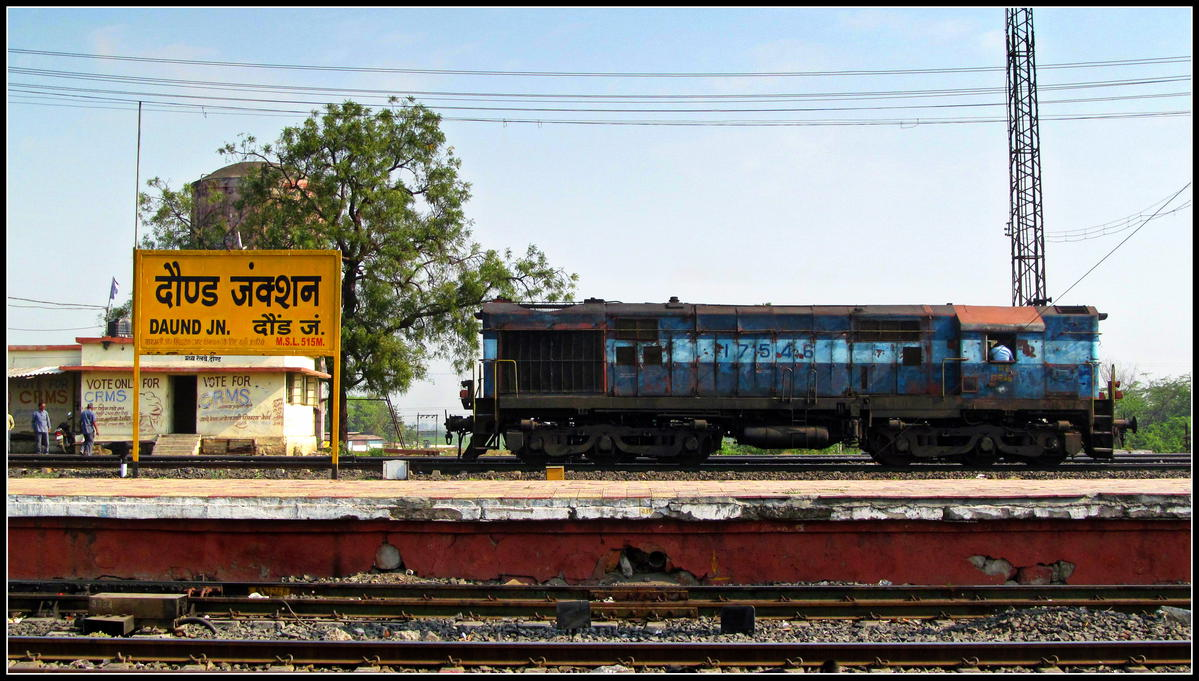
- Daund railway station

General information
- Location: Railway Hospital Road, New Daund, Pune district, Maharashtra; India
- Coordinates: 18.4640°N 74.5788°E
- Elevation: 514 metres (1,686 ft)
- System: Express train and Passenger train station
- Owner: Indian Railways
- Operator: Central Railway
- Lines: Mumbai–Chennai line Mumbai Dadar–Solapur section Daund–Manmad branch line Daund–Baramati line
- Platforms: 7
- Tracks: 14

Construction
- Structure type: Standard on ground
- Parking: Yes
- Cycle facilities: Yes

Other information
- Status: Functioning
- Station code: DD
- Zone(s): Central Railway zone
- Division(s): Pune

History
- Opened: 1857; 169 years ago
Location
- Location within Maharashtra Location within India

Daund Junction railway station is a railway junction station on the Mumbai–Chennai route of Indian Railways located in Pune district, Maharashtra, India. The Daund–Manmad line and the Daund–Baramati branch line start from here. Daund is a major freight redistribution hub.

== History ==
The Pune–Raichur sector of the Mumbai–Chennai line was opened in stages: the portion from Pune to Barshi Road was opened in 1859, from Barshi Road to Mohol in 1860 and from Mohol to Solapur also in 1860. Work on the line from Solapur southwards began in 1865, and the line was extended to Raichur in 1871.

Daund station was established in 1858 or 1859, the Daund-Baramati metre-gauge track was constructed in 1906. Daund became a junction after the broad-gauge Daund-Manmad track was built. Daund got connected to Srigonda by road when in 1928 the bridge over river Bhima was constructed.

Before establishment of Daund Chord Line, trains from Pune, Goa, Hubli, etc., and going to Delhi, Howrah, etc. had to get their engines reversed in opposite direction at Daund Junction, which was a very time-consuming process. To avoid this problem, a new station for halting such trains was established in 2020, named Daund Chord Line.

Since then, trains running on above routes halt at Daund Chord Line, bypassing Daund Junction. Daund station will now be a part of pune Railway division. 24 stations of Daund-Ankai section will be merged with Pune Railway division. Currently Daund-Ankai section is under Solapur railway division. Merging with Pune division will increase the chances of starting DEMU services between Ahmednagar and Pune railway station.

== Pune Suburban Railway ==
The Pune–Daund section was electrified in 2017, but is currently served by DEMUs only. Since March 2017, three DEMUs have started to operate on Pune–Daund route and one DEMU on Pune–Baramati route. Two DEMUs operate on Daund–Baramati route. There are plans to start EMU services on this section.

== Electric Loco Shed, Daund ==
Daund Electric loco Shed commissioned was in 2024. Current homing capacity of the Shed is 200 locos.

Serial No.	Locomotive Class	Horsepower	Quantity
1.	WAG-9	6120	50
Total Locomotives Active as of January 2026			50

== Amenities ==
Daund railway station has refreshment stalls serving vegetarian and non-vegetarian food, retiring room, waiting room and a book stall.

== Gallery ==
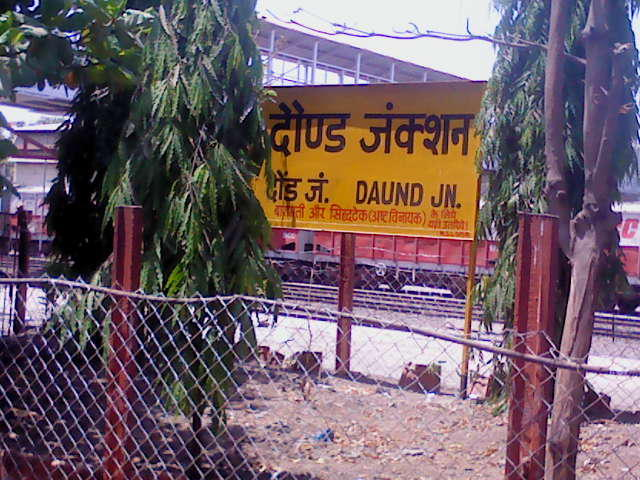
Daund Junction railway station
