= Monkey Hill railway station =

Railway Station in Maharashtra, India

Monkey Hill

General information
- Location: Bhor Ghat (Railway); India
- Coordinates: 18.7832°N 73.3664°E
- System: Indian Railways station
- Owner: Indian Railways
- Lines: Dadar–Solapur section Mumbai–Chennai line
- Platforms: 2
- Tracks: 2

Construction
- Parking: No

Other information
- Station code: MHLC
- Division(s): Pune
- Fare zone: Central Railway

Services
Indian Railways
Location

Monkey Hill is a railway station on the Bhor Ghat in Maharashtra, India. It serves as technical halt at which trains stop to check brakes. Almost all trains traveling from Khandala to Palasdari stop at Monkey Hill. Formerly, a reversing station was located between Monkey Hill and Khandala. The remains of the reversing station can be seen near the Amrutanjan Bridge on the old Mumbai–Pune road (Mumbai–Chennai National Highway NH48).

Some of the trains halting at Monkey Hill are:

1. 11008 Deccan Express
2. 11010 Sinhagad Express
3. 11020 Konark Express
4. 11024 Sahyadri Express (Formal Poona Mail)
5. 11030 Koyna Express
6. 11302 Udyan Express
7. 17412 Mahalaxmi Express
8. 12124 Deccan Queen
9. 12126 Pragati Express
10. 12128 Mumbai–Pune Intercity Express
11. 12702 Hussainsagar Express
12. 17032 Hyderabad Mumbai Express
13. 16382 Kanyakumari–Mumbai Express
14. 22106 Indrayani Express

== Catch siding ==
The station also has an inclined track (18.7891°N 73.3675°E) in case of train brake failure. This is called a catch siding. It was used if a train had problem with its brakes or was out of control, as the inclined track slowed the train. Today this is very rarely used.
