= Mumbai–Chennai line =

Railway line in India

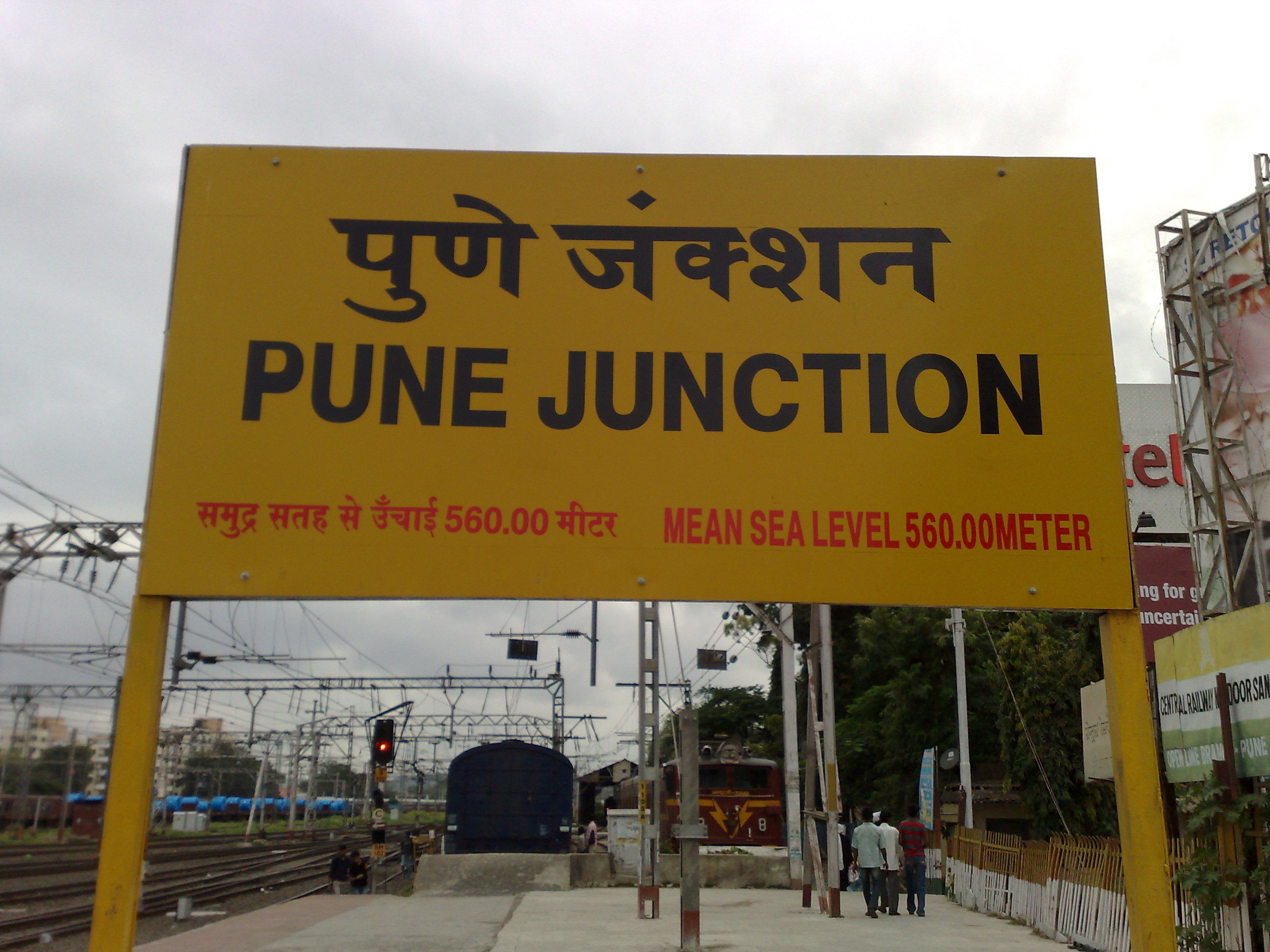
- Pune Junction railway station is an important Railway station on Mumbai–Chennai line

Overview
- Status: Operational
- Owner: Indian Railways
- Locale: Maharashtra; Karnataka; Telangana; Andhra Pradesh; Tamil Nadu
- Termini: Mumbai CSMT; Chennai Central

Service
- Operators: Central Railway; South Central Railway; South Coast Railway; Southern Railway

History
- Opened: 1871

Technical
- Line length: 1,281 km (796 mi)
- Number of tracks: 2/1
- Track gauge: 5 ft 6 in (1,676 mm) broad gauge
- Electrification: 25 kV 50 Hz AC overhead line
- Operating speed: 130 km/h (81 mph)
- Highest elevation: Lonavala 622 m (2,041 ft)
Route map
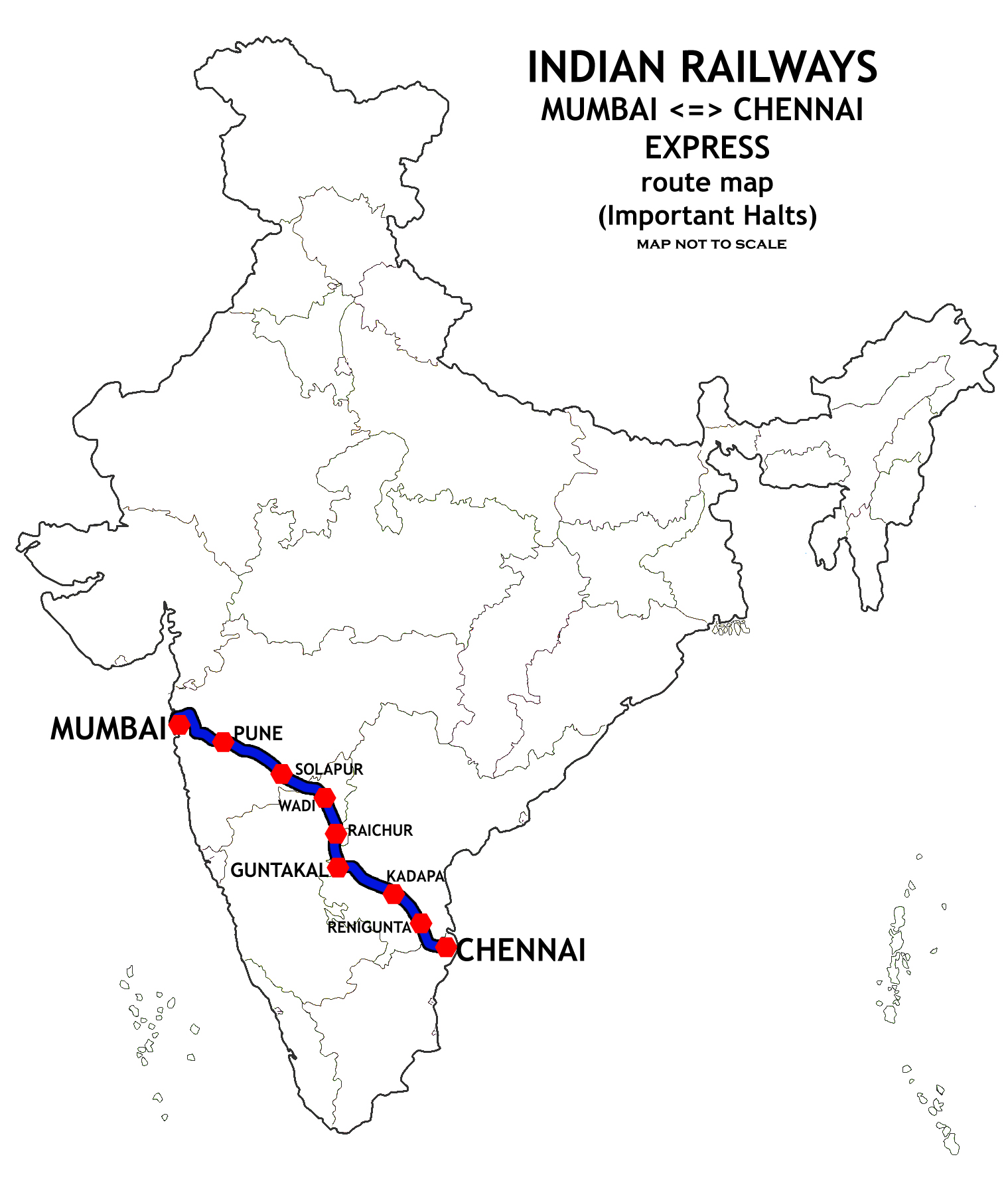
Mumbai–Chennai route map

The Mumbai–Chennai line, earlier known as Bombay–Madras line, is an Indian railway line connecting Mumbai CSMT and Chennai Central. It is one of the seven major trunk routes of the Indian Railways. It traverses about 1,281 km (796 mi) along the Indian peninsula across the states of Maharashtra, Karnataka, Telangana, Andhra Pradesh, and Tamil Nadu. The line forms part of the planned Diamond Quadrilateral rail network.

== Sections ==
The 1,281 km (796 mi)-long trunk line is divided into the following sections:

1. Central line (Mumbai Suburban Railway)
2. Dadar–Solapur section
3. Solapur–Guntakal section
4. Guntakal–Renigunta section
5. Renigunta–Chennai section

== History ==
The first passenger train in India from Chhatrapati Shivaji Maharaj Terminus in Mumbai to Thane ran on 16 April 1853 on the track laid by the Great Indian Peninsula Railway. The GIPR line was extended to Kalyan in 1854 and then on the south-east side to Khopoli via Palasdhari at the foot of the Western Ghats in 1856. While construction work was in progress across the Bhor Ghat, GIPR opened to public the Khandala–Pune track in 1858.

The Bhor Ghat incline connecting Palasdari to Khandala was completed in 1862, thereby connecting Mumbai and Pune. The Western Ghats presented a big obstacle to the railway engineers in the 1860s. The summit of the Bhor Ghat (earlier spelt as Bhore Ghat) incline being 2,027 feet. The maximum gradient was: 1 in 37 with extreme curvature. "The works on the Bhore ghat comprised 25 tunnels of a total length of nearly 4,000 yards, two of the longest being 435 yards and 341 yards respectively. The Bhore ghat have eight lofty viaducts having a total length of 2,961 feet. Two of the largest are more than 500 feet long with a maximum height of 1160 and 163 feet. There are 22 bridges of spans from 7 to 30 feet and 81 culverts of various sizes." The construction of the Bhor Ghat incline came at a high price: an estimated 24,000 builders died during the eight years of construction.

The Pune–Raichur sector of the Mumbai–Chennai line was opened in stages: the portion from Pune to Barshi Road was opened in 1859, from Barshi Road to Mohol in 1860 and from Mohol to Solapur also in 1860. Work on the line from Solapur southwards was begun in 1865 and the line was extended to Raichur in 1871. Thus the line met the line of Madras Railway thereby establishing direct Mumbai–Chennai link.

The first passenger train in southern India and the third in India was operated by Madras Railway from Royapuram to Wallajah Road (Arcot) in 1856. MR extended its trunk route to Beypur / Kadalundi (near Calicut) and initiated work on a north-western branch out of Arakkonam in 1861. The branch line reached Renigunta in 1862, and to Raichur in 1871, where it connected to the Great Indian Peninsula Railway line from Mumbai.

== Electrification ==
Railway electrification in India began with the first electric train, between Bombay Victoria Terminus and Kurla by the Great Indian Peninsula Railway's (GIPR) on 3 February 1925, on 1.5 kV DC. The Kalyan–Pune section was electrified with 1.5 kV DC overhead system in 1930.

The previously used 1.5 kV DC was converted to 25 kV AC on 5 May 2013 from Kalyan to Khopoli and Kalyan to Kasara. Conversion from 1.5 kV DC to 25 kV AC on the Lokmanya Tilak Terminus-Thane-Kalyan section was completed on 12 January 2014. The CSMT to LTT section was converted from 1.5 kV DC to 25 kV AC on 8 June 2015. The Kasara-Pune section was also converted from 1.5 kV DC to 25 kV AC.

The Pune–Daund section as well as Daund -Bhigwan section was electrified in 2017. The electrification of the Bhigwan - Kalaburgi section was completed by March 2022. The Kalaburgi -Wadi section was electrified in 2018.

The Renigunta–Nandalur sector electrification was completed in 2006. The Nandalur–Guntakal sector was electrified by Dec 2013. The electrification of the Guntakal-Wadi section was completed in 2015.

The Chennai Central–Tiruvallur sector, as well as the Basin Bridge–Chennai Beach sector were electrified in 1979–80. The Tiruvallur –Arakkonam sector was electrified in 1982–83, Arakkonam–Tiruttani sector in 1983–84 and the Tiruttani–Renigunta sector in 1984–85.

Hence, the entire Mumbai-Chennai route is completely electrified.

== Speed limit ==
The stretch between Chhatrapati Shivaji Maharaj Terminus and Kalyan is classified as 'Group A' line, where trains run with speed up to 110 km/h due to train density and curve limitations . The Kalyan–Pune–Daund–Wadi line and the Wadi–Raichur–Adoni–Arrakonam–Chennai Central line are classified as 'Group B' lines and can take speeds up to 130 km/h.

== Passenger movement ==
Mumbai CSMT, Pune, Solapur and Chennai Central on the line, are amongst the top hundred booking stations of Indian Railway.
