= Kelavli railway station =

Railway station in Maharashtra, India

Kelavli Railway Station केळवली रेल्वे स्थानक
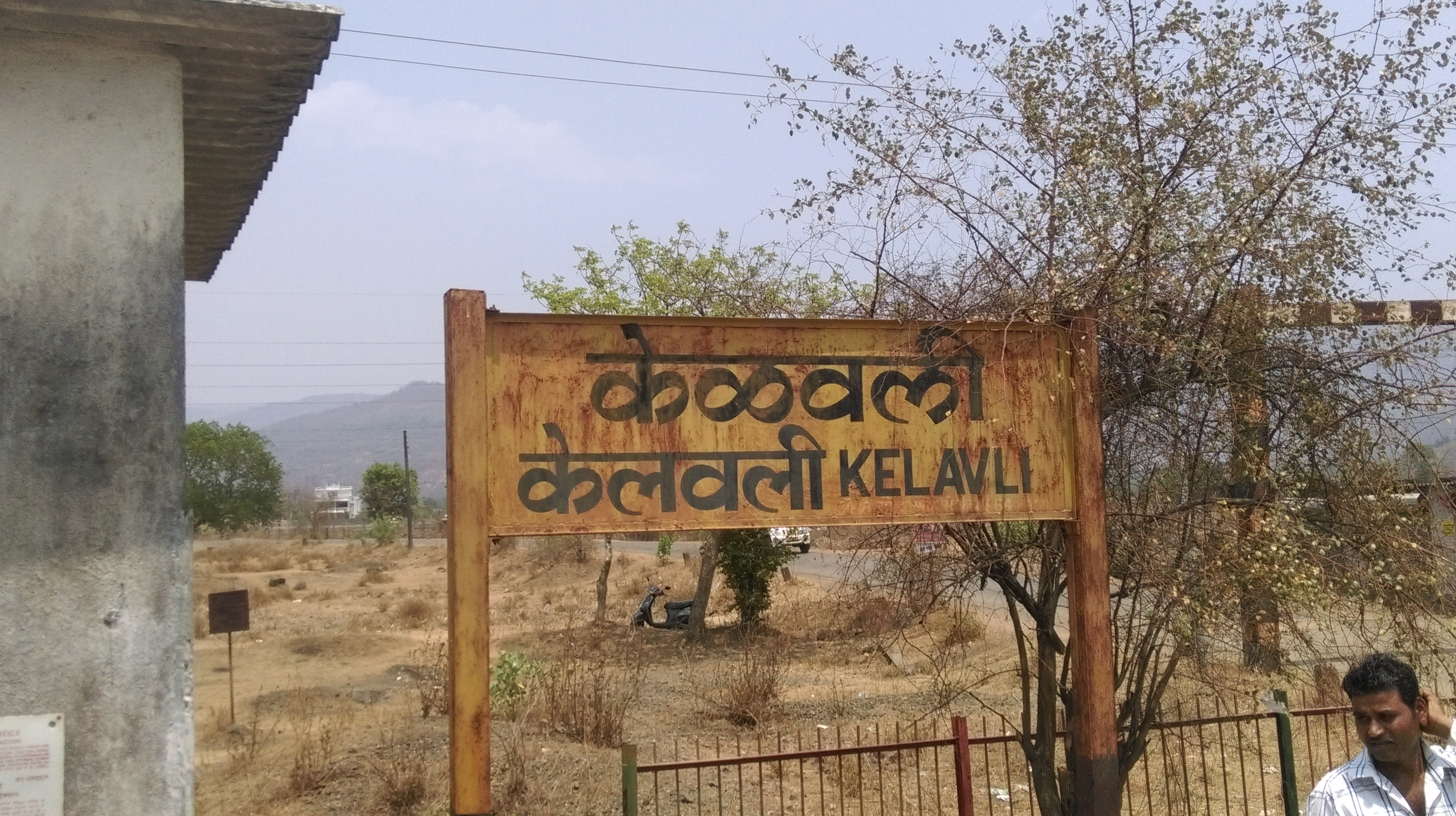

General information
- Coordinates: 18°50′45″N 73°19′8″E
- Elevation: 64.61 metres (212.0 ft)
- System: Indian Railways and Mumbai Suburban Railway station
- Owner: Ministry of Railways, Indian Railways
- Line: Central Line
- Platforms: 1
- Tracks: 1

Construction
- Structure type: Standard, on ground

Other information
- Status: Active
- Station code: KLY
- Fare zone: Central Railways

History
- Opened: 1 November 1879

Services
Preceding station	Mumbai Suburban Railway	Following station
Palasdhari towards Chhatrapati Shivaji Terminus	Central line	Dolavli towards Khopoli
Route map
Location
- Location within India Location within Maharashtra

Kelavli railway station (station code: KLY) is a railway station on the Central line of the Mumbai Suburban Railway network. It is on the Karjat–Khopoli route. Palasdhari railway station is the previous station and Dolavli railway station is the next station. Kelavli lies on Karjat–Khopoli State Highway 35.
