= Kalyan Junction railway station =

Railway junction station in Thane district, Maharashtra, India

Kalyan Junction
- Kalyan Junction railway station

General information
- Coordinates: 19.23525°N 73.1305°E
- Elevation: 8.840 metres (29.00 ft)
- System: Indian Railways and Mumbai Suburban Railway station
- Owner: Indian Railways
- Operator: Central Railways
- Lines: Central line Howrah–Nagpur–Mumbai line Howrah–Allahabad–Mumbai line Mumbai–Chennai line Bhusawal–Kalyan section Dadar–Solapur section
- Platforms: 8 + 6 (under construction)
- Tracks: 20+
- Connections: Orange Line Kalyan Railway Station (under construction), KDMT bus stand, auto and taxi stand

Construction
- Structure type: Standard (on ground)
- Parking: Yes
- Cycle facilities: Yes
- Accessible: Available

Other information
- Status: Active
- Station code: K (suburban); KYN (mainline)
- Zone(s): Central Railway zone
- Division(s): Mumbai CR

History
- Opened: 1 May 1854
- Former names: Callian Railway Station

Passengers
- 2012-13: 3,60,348

Services
Preceding station	Mumbai Suburban Railway	Following station
Thakurli towards Chhatrapati Shivaji Terminus	Central line	Shahad towards Kasara
Thakurli towards Chhatrapati Shivaji Terminus	Central line	Vithalwadi towards Khopoli
Route map
Location
- Location within Maharashtra

Kalyan Junction (station code: KYN) is a major railway junction station on the Central Line of the Mumbai Suburban Railway network, lying at the junction of the north-east and south-east lines of the suburban Mumbai division of the Central Railway, 54 km (34 mi) north-east of Mumbai. It is one of the busiest railway stations both in the country, and globally as it handles a huge amount of passenger load daily.

This is one of the most important railway junctions serving the country. It is an important stop for all the trains. The station currently has eight platforms and more than 15 railway tracks, with additional platforms proposed under a yard-remodelling project to separate suburban and long-distance operations. The Kalyan Electric Loco Shed and Kalyan Diesel Loco Shed located nearby are important maintenance facilities serving the Mumbai region.

== Major developments ==
A proposed Kalyan–Ahmednagar railway line (often called the "third ghat project") has been discussed since the British period and would create a shorter route connecting Mumbai with Marathwada, Andhra Pradesh and Telangana. The major challenge for this project is 18.96 km long tunnel Malshej Ghat section.

The Kalyan–Murbad section, considered the first phase of this route, has been surveyed in recent years. Kalyan Junction is a major interchange on the Central Railway network and lies at the branching point of the north-east (towards Kasara) and south-east (towards Karjat/Khopoli) suburban lines. It serves as the last stop for fast suburban services from Mumbai before trains begin halting at all stations on the Kasara and Khopoli sections.

== History ==
Even before the Bori Bunder-Thane line opened on April 16, 1853, further progress was already underway. The extension beyond Thane required the navigation of the two Thane Creek, and tunnels in the Godadunghur hills all the way to the Parseek point (under today's Parsik Hill). This section was let out to contractors William Whythes and Jackson in April 1851, at a cost of Rs. 3,41,407, and was completed by December 1853. The section further ahead to Callian was let out to a Parsi contractor Mr. Jamsetjee Dorabjee in May 1852, for a cost of Rs. 1,65,851 and was completed by April 1854. The line to Callian (Kalyan) opened on 1 May 1854.

The first journey to Callian from Bori Bunder was scheduled that day to begin at 4:50 p.m, with Lord Elphinstone accompanied by around 250 guests. The journey proceeded, with a halt at Bhandoop to fill in water. The train finally reached Callian at 6:10 p.m, but it did not go all the way to the station, rather only to the comparatively nearer Creek ground. Similar to the first train journey of 1853 from Bombay to Tannah, at the destination were bands, decorative tents, and a dinner. The celebration was concluded with a display of fireworks, with the train leaving for its origin at 9 p.m., arriving two hours later at 11 p.m.

== Station layout ==
There are eight platforms at Kalyan Junction. Platforms 2 and 3, 4 and 5, and 6 and 7 share a common platform base. Platforms 4, 5, 6, and 7 serve for express trains. Platforms 5 and 7 serve for all Chhatrapati Shivaji Maharaj Terminus-bound fast local trains where Platforms 4 and 6 serve for all Khopoli/Kasara-bound fast local trains. The majority of trains towards Nashik side from Chhatrapati Shivaji Maharaj Terminus stop at platform 4. Platform 1 and Platform 1A are dedicated to slow local trains that start from Kalyan and go to CSMT.

== Loco sheds ==
The Kalyan Electric Loco Shed and Kalyan Diesel Loco Shed are located to the north-east and south-east of the station respectively. They are two of five loco sheds serving the Mumbai Metropolitan region, with the others being Kurla, Bandra and Neral.

Locomotives at Kalyan Diesel Loco Shed
Serial no.	Locomotive class	Horsepower	Quantity
1.	WDG-3A	3100	11
2.	WDM-3D	3300	15
3.	WDG-4/4D	4000/4500	64
4	WDP-4/4B/4D	4000/4500	12
Total locomotives active as of August 2025			102

== 1991 train bomb blast ==
On 8 November 1991, a bomb exploded on a train when it reached Kalyan railway station. Twelve people were killed and 65 injured in the explosion. Ravinder Singh, alias Bittu, who was linked to the Babbar Khalsa, a Sikh militant organization, was convicted in the case.

== Gallery ==
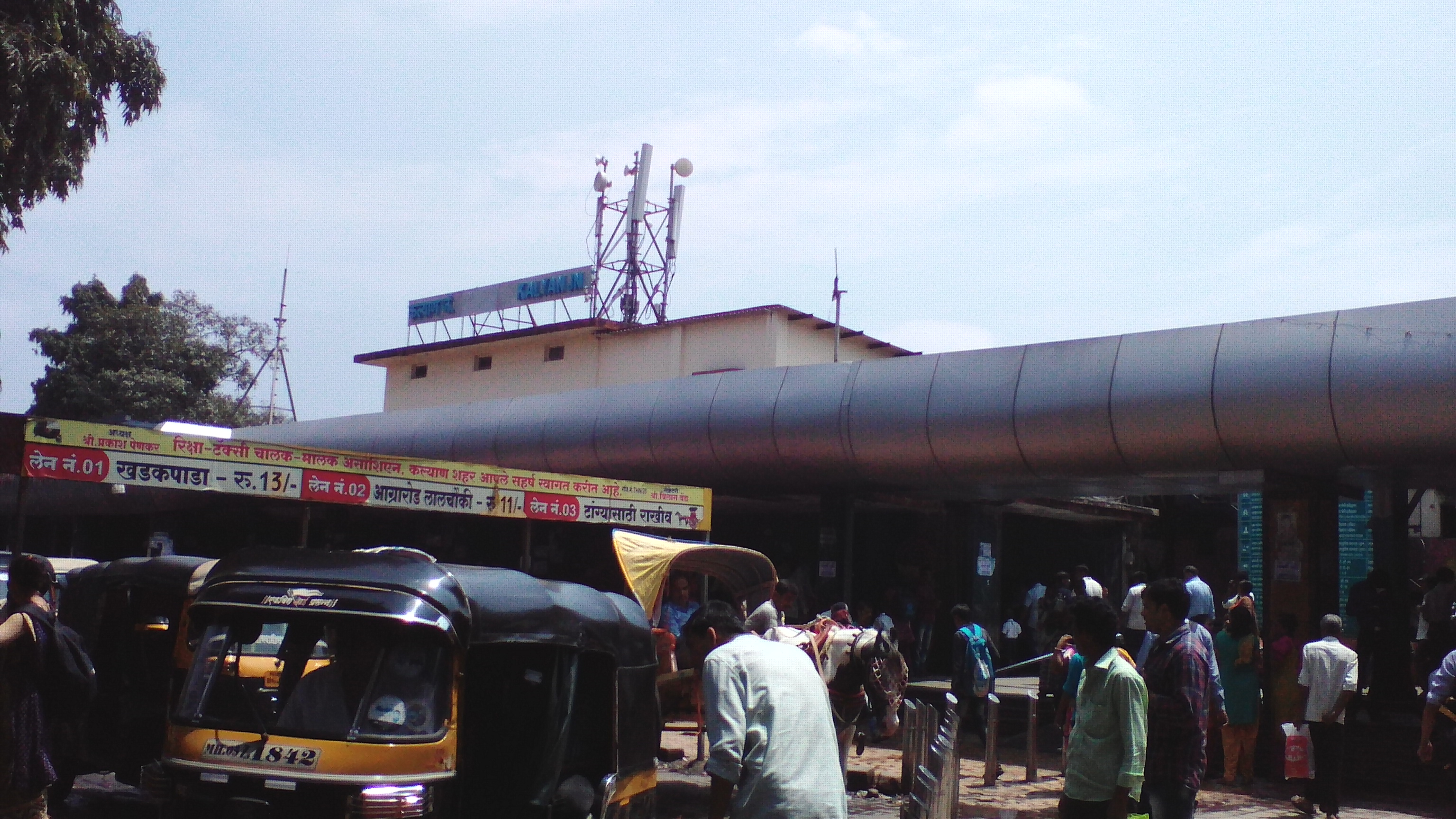
Kalyan Junction railway station booking office

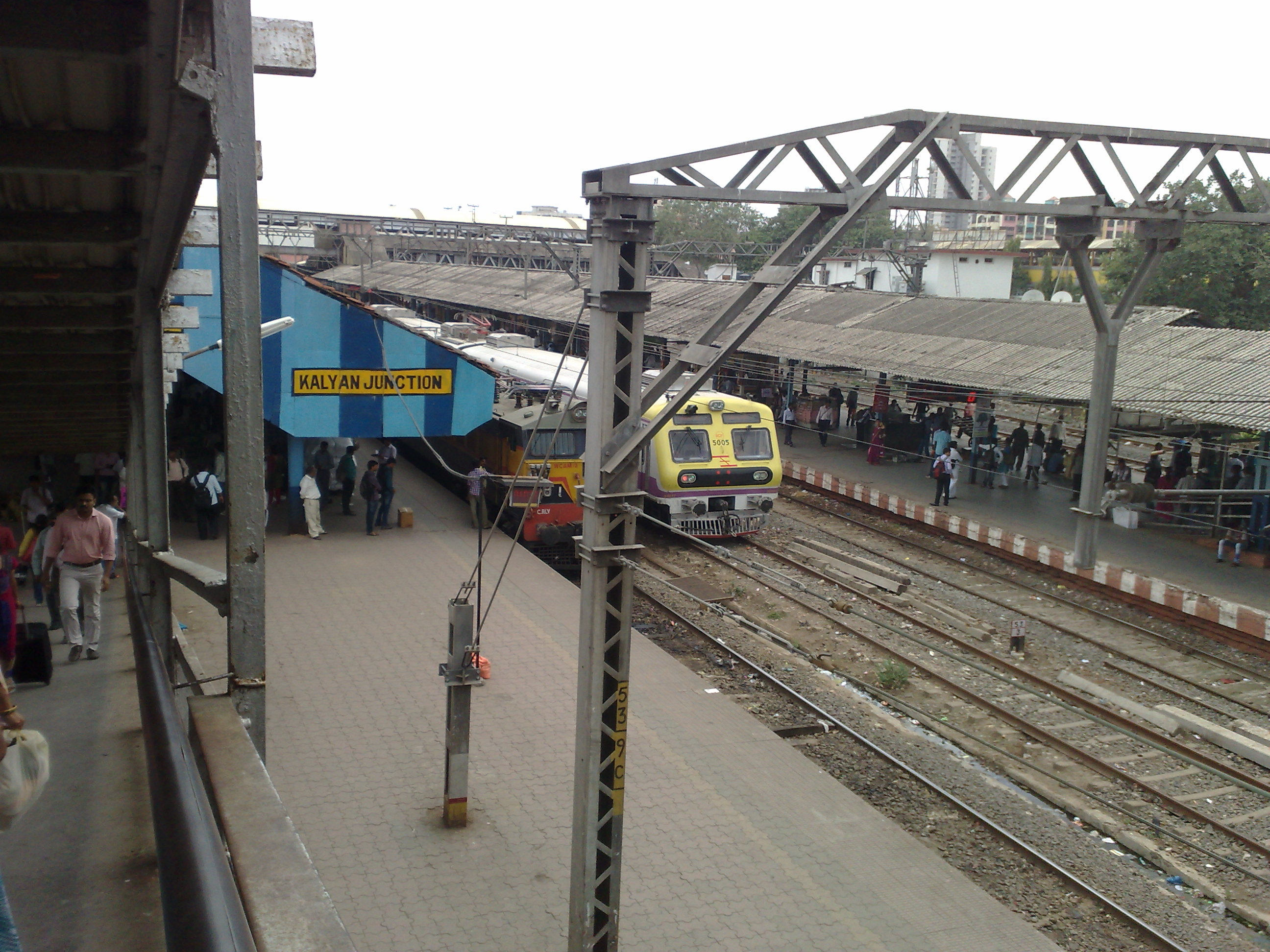
Kalyan Junction railway station - overview

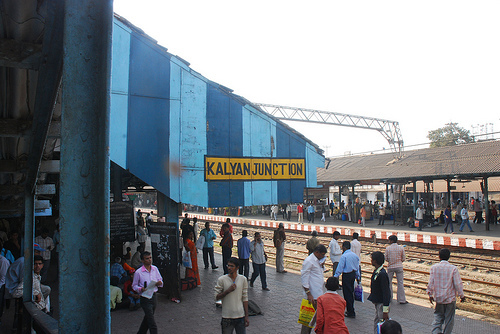
Kalyan Junction platform view

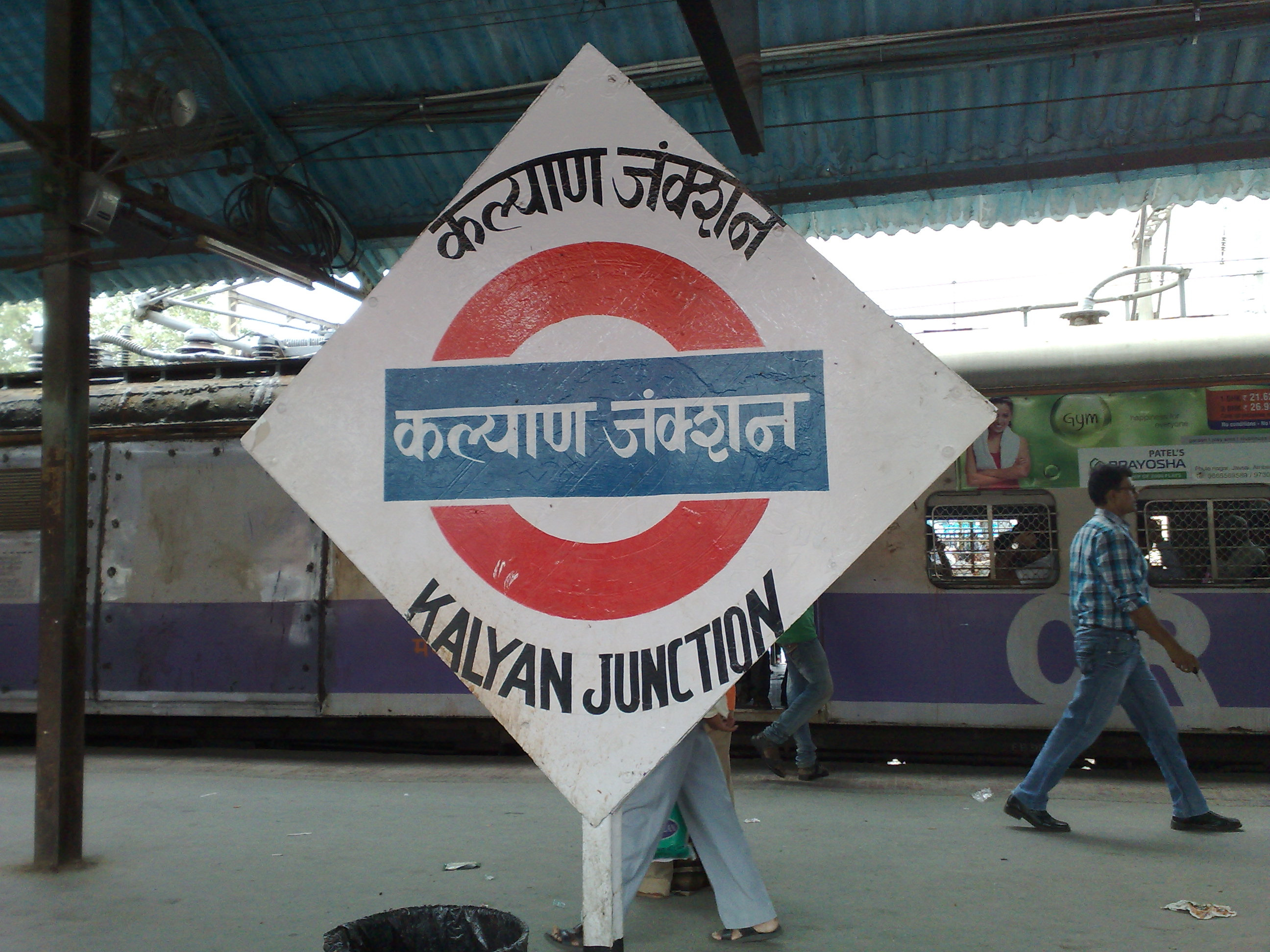
Kalyan Junction railway station platform board

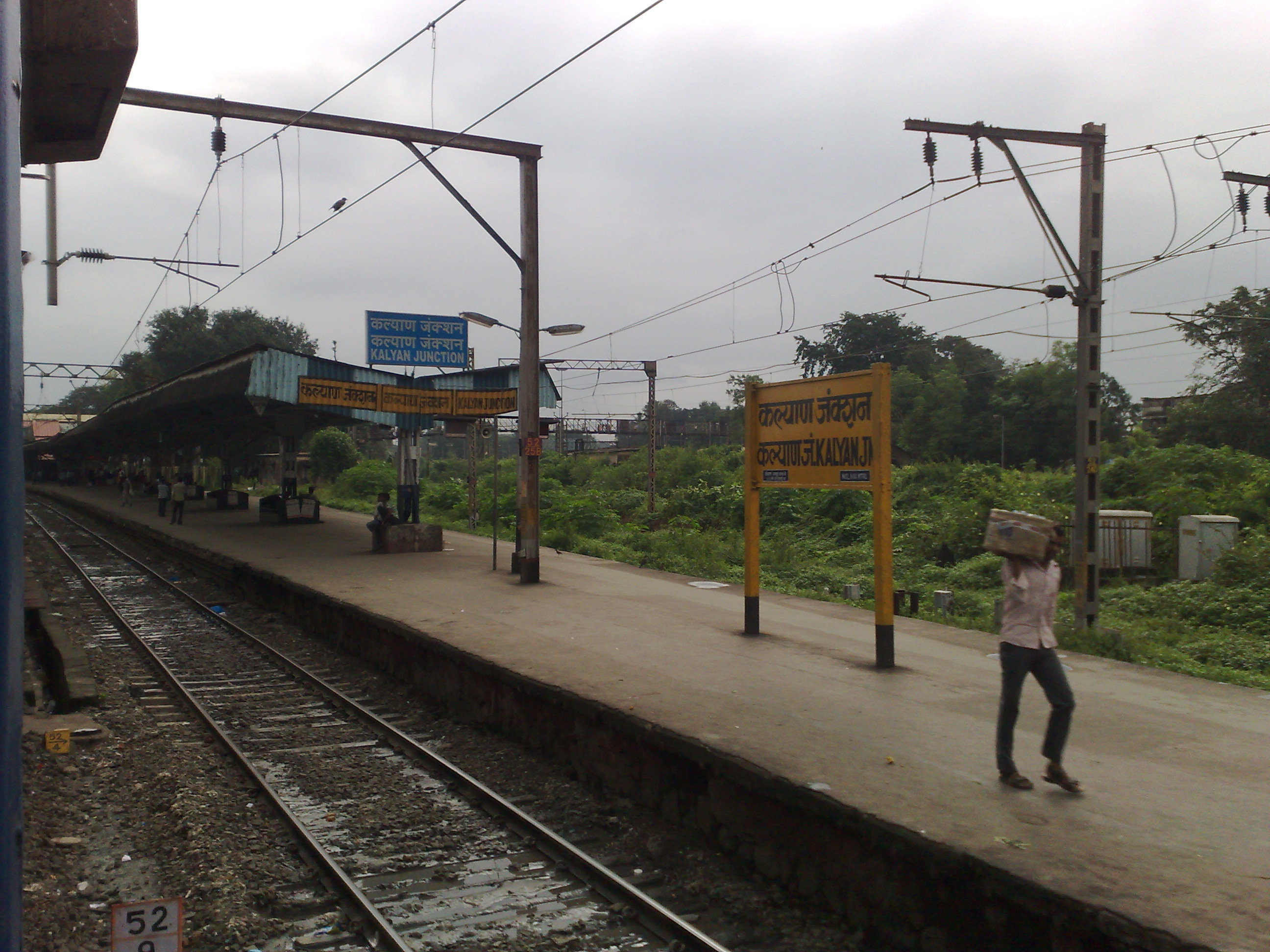
Entering Kalyan Junction station

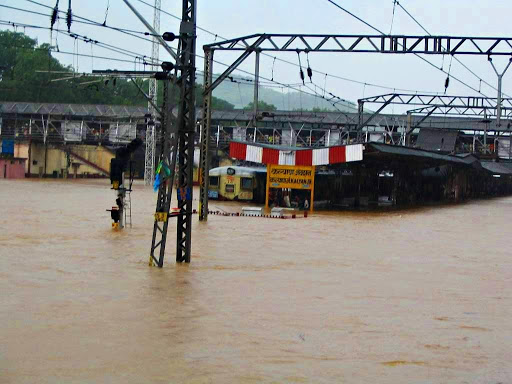
Kalyan railway station during floods

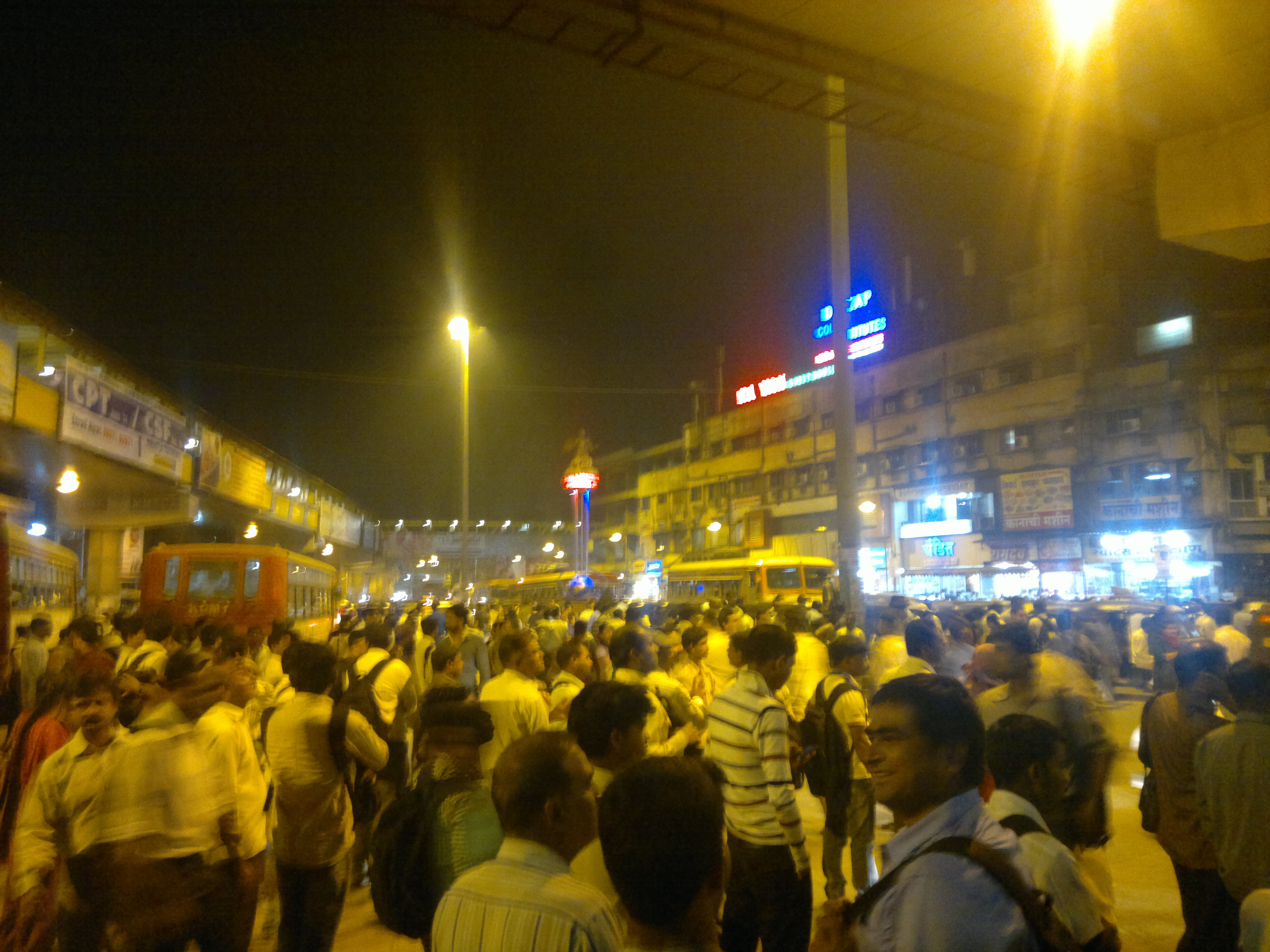
Crowd outside Kalyan Junction

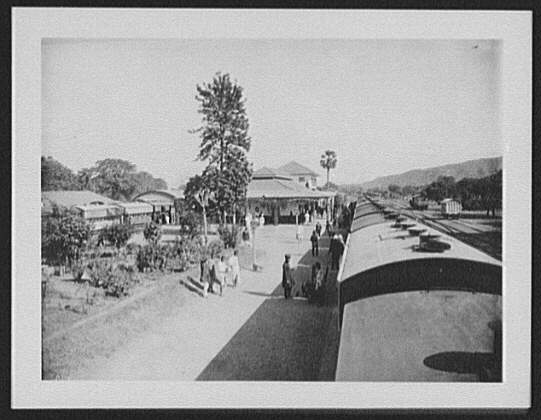
Kalyan Junction station, c.1895
