= LWJ =

LWJ may refer to:

- FDD's Long War Journal, an American news website which reports on the War on terror
- LWJ, the station code for Lowjee railway station, Maharashtra, India
