= Dolavli railway station =

Railway Station in Maharashtra, India

Dolavli Railway Station डोळवली रेल्वे स्थानक
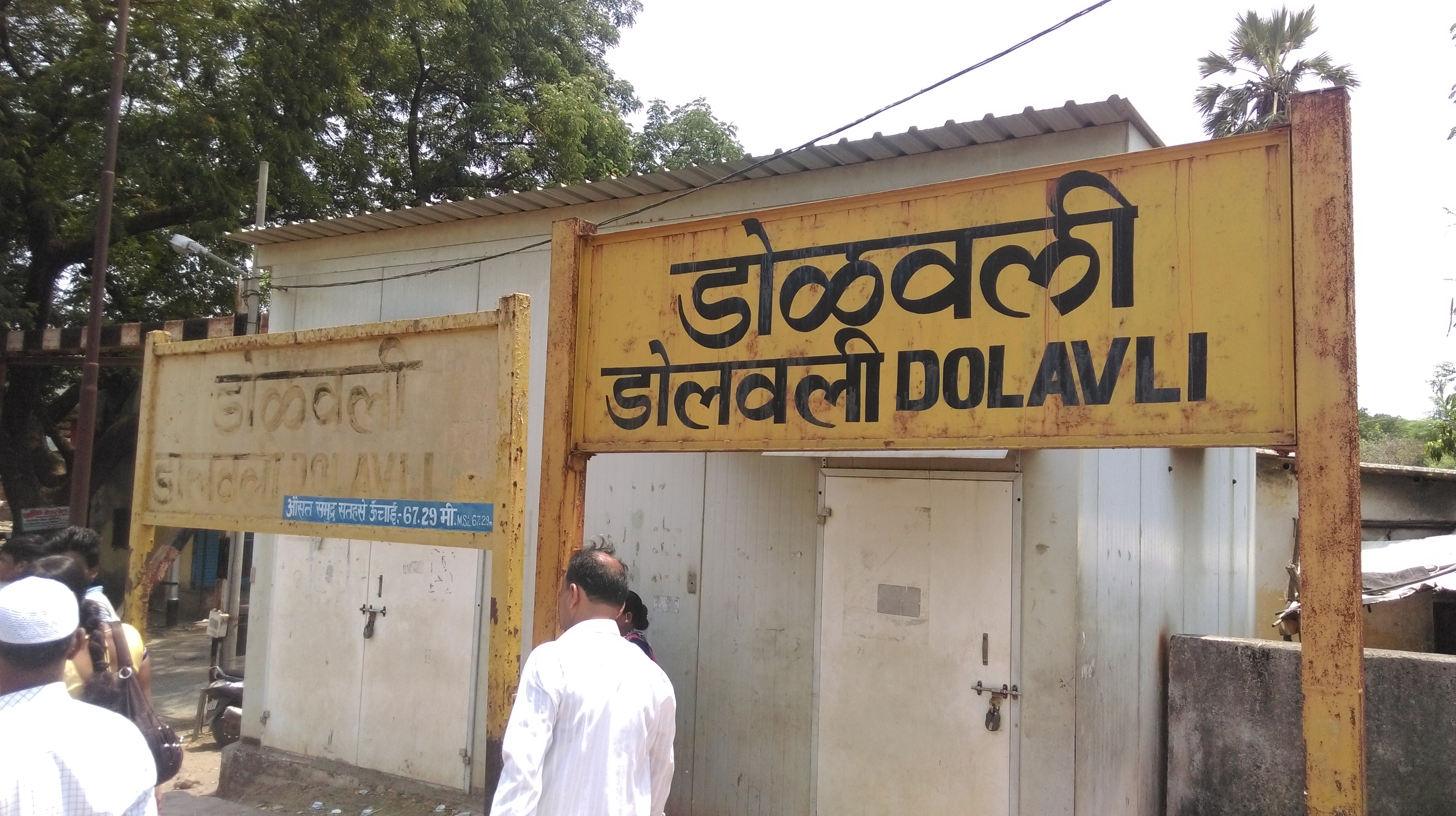

General information
- Coordinates: 18°50′4″N 73°19′12″E
- Elevation: 67.29 metres (220.8 ft)
- System: Indian Railways and Mumbai Suburban Railway station
- Owner: Ministry of Railways, Indian Railways
- Line: Central Line
- Platforms: 1
- Tracks: 1

Construction
- Structure type: Standard, on ground

Other information
- Status: Active
- Station code: DLV
- Fare zone: Central Railways

Services
Preceding station	Mumbai Suburban Railway	Following station
Kelavli towards Chhatrapati Shivaji Terminus	Central line	Lowjee towards Khopoli
Route map
Location
- Location within India Location within Maharashtra

Dolavli (station code: DLV) is a railway station on the Central line of the Mumbai Suburban Railway network in the Central Railway. It is in Raigad district, Maharashtra. It is on the Karjat–Khopoli route. Kelavali is the previous station and Lowjee is the next station.
