= Bhor Ghat rail accident =

1869 derailment in Bhor Ghat Pass, India

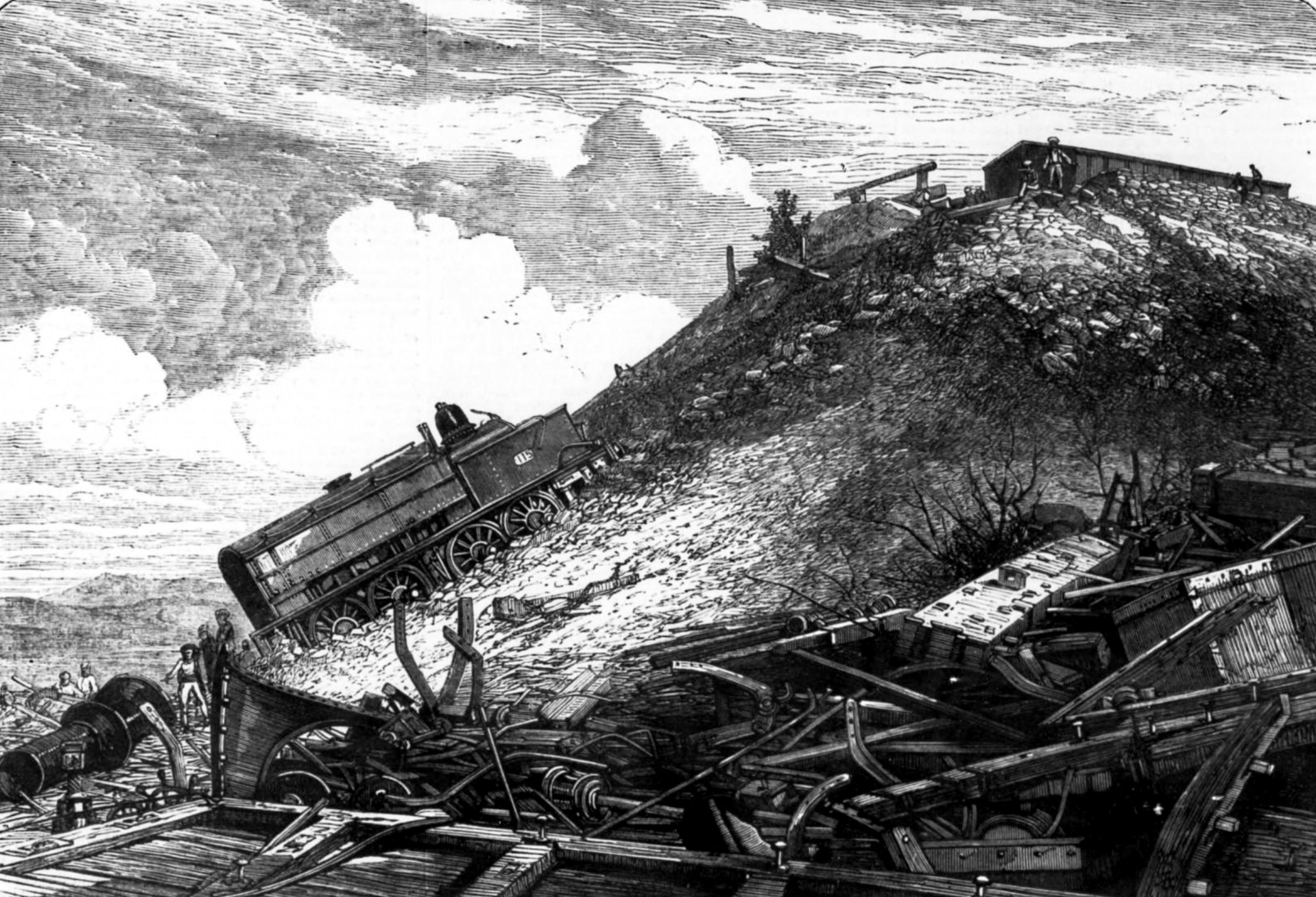
- Scene of the accident (The Illustrated London News, 6 March 1869)

Details
- Date: 26 January 1869 c. 2 AM
- Location: Bhor Ghat mountain Pass, Maharashtra, India
- Country: British India
- Line: Mumbai–Pune Mail
- Operator: Great Indian Peninsula Railway
- Incident type: Derailment
- Cause: Brake failure

Statistics
- Deaths: 15
- Injured: 35

The Bhor Ghat rail accident (also Bhore Ghaut accident) occurred on 26 January 1869 at Bhor Ghat Pass in Maharashtra, India, on the Great Indian Peninsula Railway line, connecting Mumbai and Madras (Chennai). Brakes of the Mumbai–Pune Mail line train failed to stop the train, due to wet tracks and a difficult, rapidly decreasing part of the rail, finally crashing through a dead-end of the Bhor Ghat Reversing Station track down the railway embankment, causing the death of at least 15 people and 36 more injured. The event is recorded as one of the first major rail accidents in the history of rail transport in India.

== Bhor Ghat Incline ==
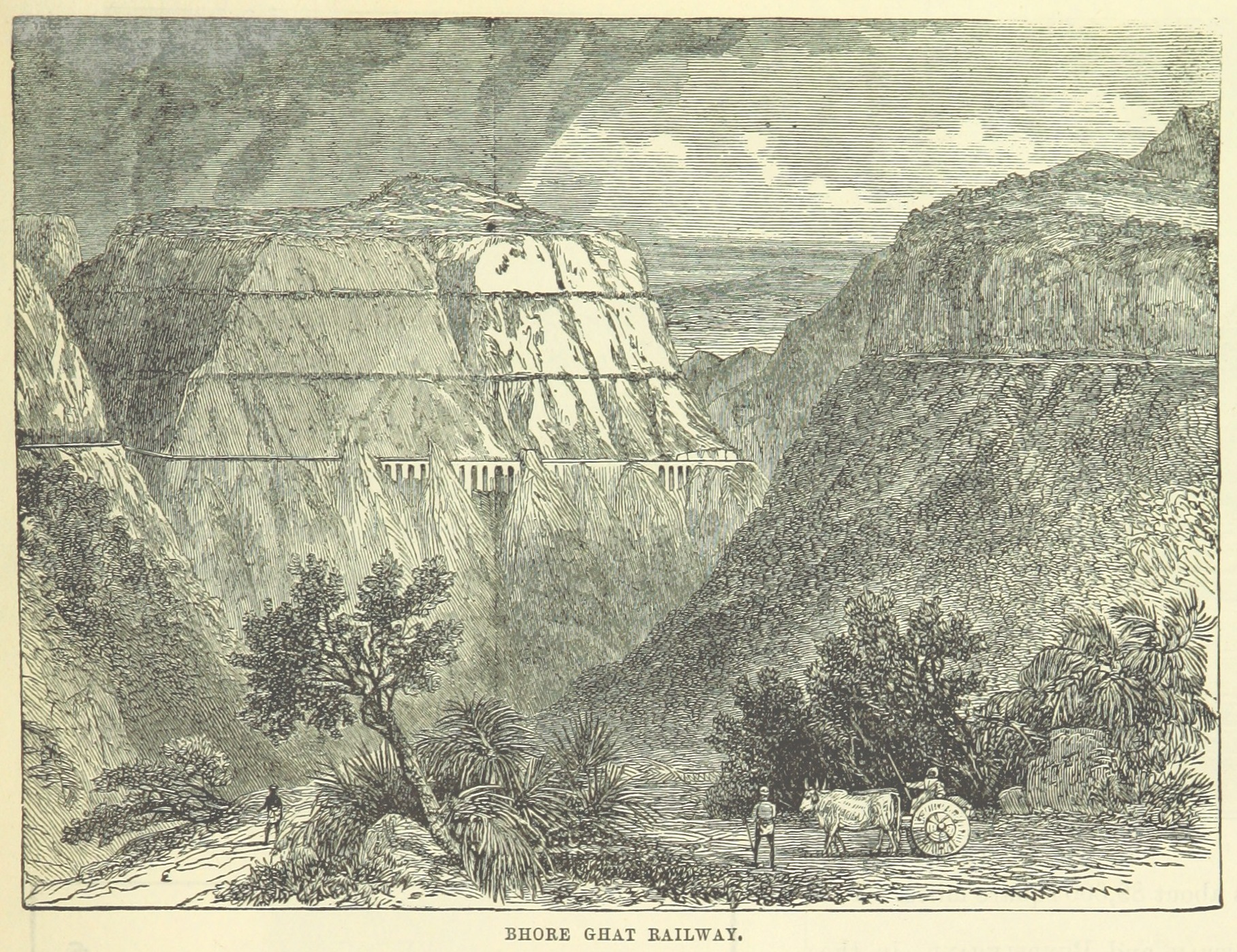
Bhore Ghat Railway (c. 1890)

The idea of railway connection of Bombay and Madras, two major port cities at the opposite coast sides of the subcontinent, became being fulfilled in the 1850s. At the end of 1855 construction of the Mumbai–Pune railway section reached the northern slopes of Bhor Ghat. One of the most complicated railway projects of that time took workers led by British engineers Adamson and Clowser eight years to build, facing the obstacles of increasing budget, industrial unrest, disease and accidents, causing death of as many as 24,000 workers.

Due to extreme terrain conditions, Bhor Ghat Reversing Station had to be built as a solution of need of leading the track down the valley, out of Bhor Ghat ridge, continuing to Khandala station. The section through the pass with 28 tunnels and 8 stone viaducts was opened in April 1863, although the whole Mumbai-Chennai railway was finally completed and operated in 1871.

== Accident ==
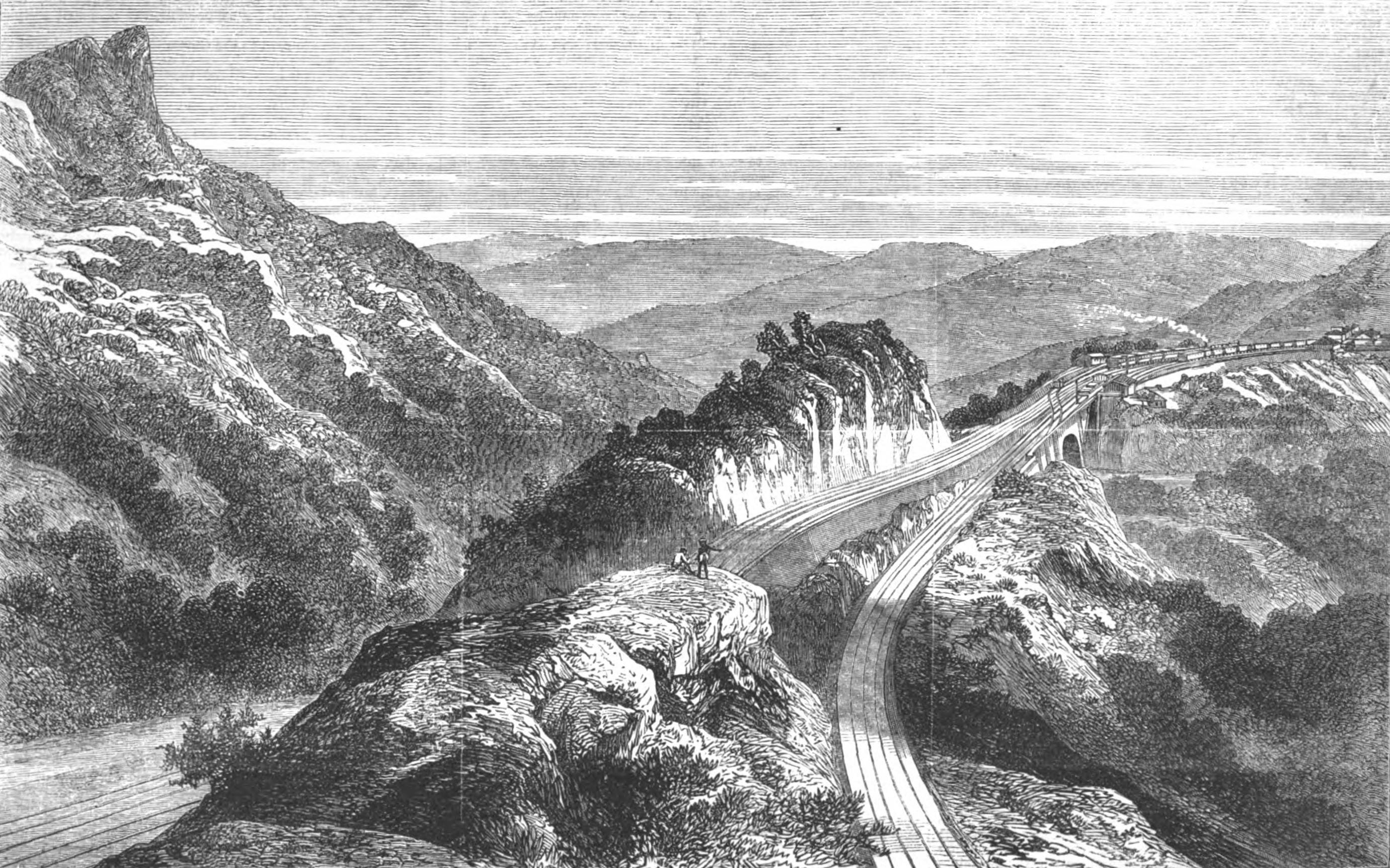
The reversing station, Bhore Ghaut (at the time of the event, The Illustrated London News, 6 March 1869)

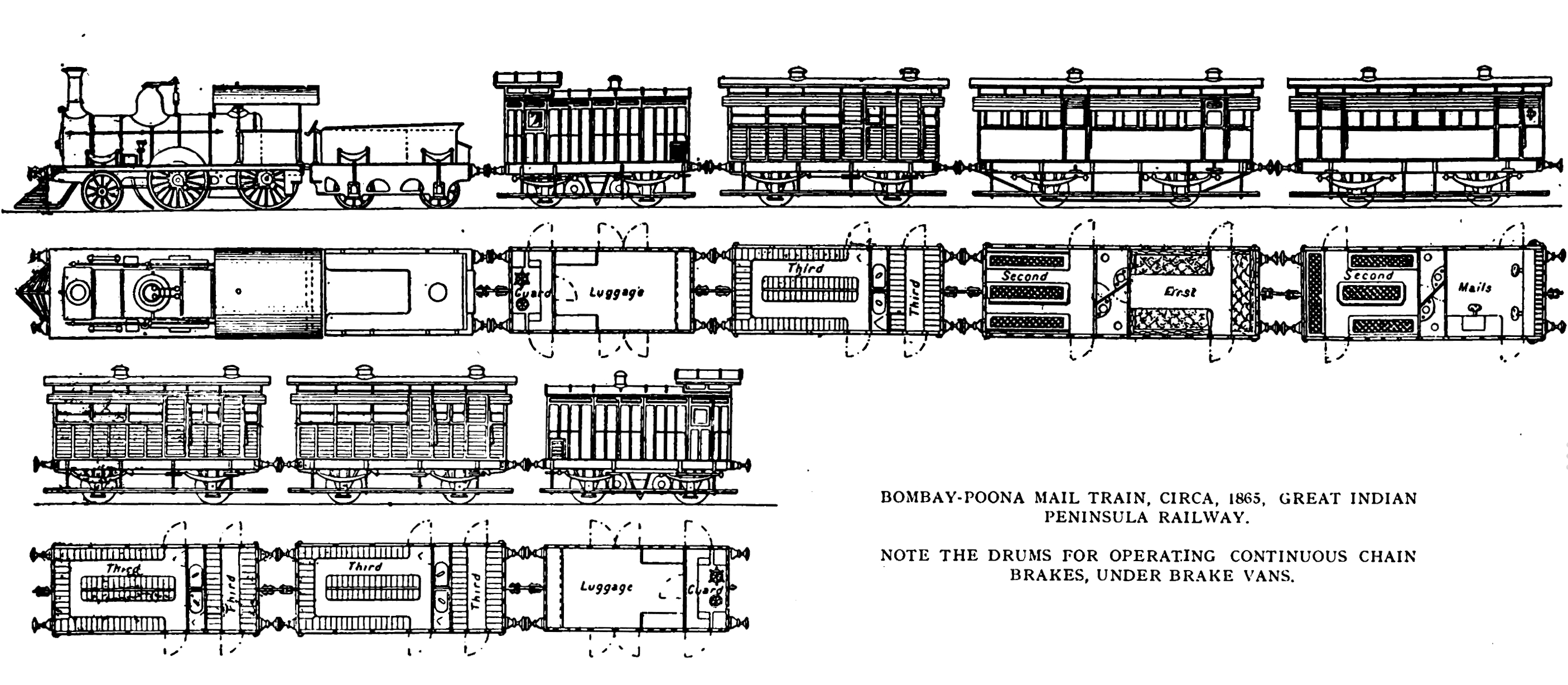
Composition and interior of the Mumbai–Pune Mail services around 1865

At 11 PM of Monday night of January 25 1869 a regular Mumbai–Pune Mail train of the Great Indian Peninsula Railway departed from Solapur left Pune railway station. Between Lonavala and Khandalla stations the steam locomotive engineer Mr Arton noticed that the heavy dew on the rails had rendered them unusually slippery, and usage of the brakes had just little control over the train. On leaving Khandalla the train consisted of one road van, two saloon vans, two second-class carriages and three third-class carriages, controlled by four brake vans, transferring about 150 passengers. Around 2 AM of January 26, on the decline part of the route a few miles away of the Bhor Ghat Reversing Station, train crew, including several brakemen, realized that brakes has no effect of train speed. Engine was reversed immediately, but the train still dashed on at a speed estimated by the witnesses at between fifty and sixty miles an hour.

After some time the train came to the foot of the incline. This fact, brakes on and the reversed engine then had some effect in decrease of the train speed, being reduced between twenty to twenty-four miles an hour at its arrival at the reversing station embankment. At this point the train run through the end of the embankment, and the engine, the four brakes, four third-class and one second-class carriage went over being completely destroyed. The engine and brakes turned a little to one side as they fell the passenger carriages went straight down the embankment. Some of train crew members, including Arton, and passengers jumped out of the train, mostly sustaining just light injuries.

== Aftermath ==
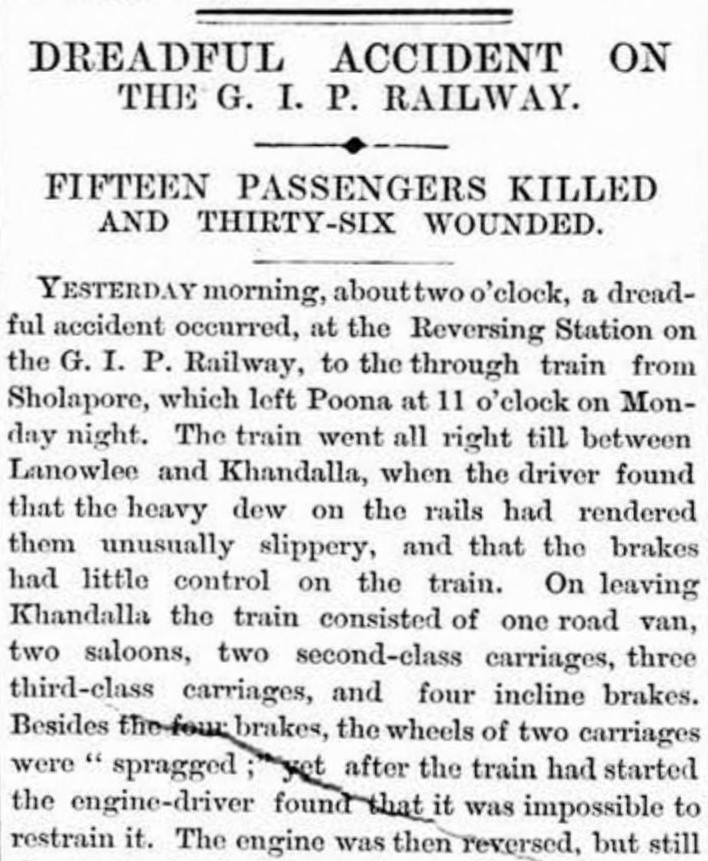
Part of the article in The Bombay Gazette newspaper, 27 January 1869

Immediately after the crash, information was telegraphed from Bhor Ghat to Lonavala, and in about an hour the district manager, Mr. Middleton, and a number of assistants arcived at the scene, a special train was also despatched from Poona with three doctors onboard. Final death toll of the incident was 14 dead, mostly Indians riding in third-class carriages, and 36 wounded, one of them dying in the hospital about a day after. Surviving passengers were transported by a special train to Mumbai on the Tuesday morning of January 26.

Major British and British-Indian newspapers, including The Illustrated London News or The Bombay Gazette, informed about the incident. The event is mentioned in Act I of the Government of India from early 1869 urging them to accept and sustain more security measures on the railway. The act was later repealed by the Governor of Bombay Seymour Vesey-FitzGerald.

== See also ==
- Bhor Ghat
- Great Indian Peninsula Railway
- Mumbai–Pune Mail
- List of railway accidents and incidents in India
