= Dadar–Solapur section =

Railway Station in Maharashtra, India

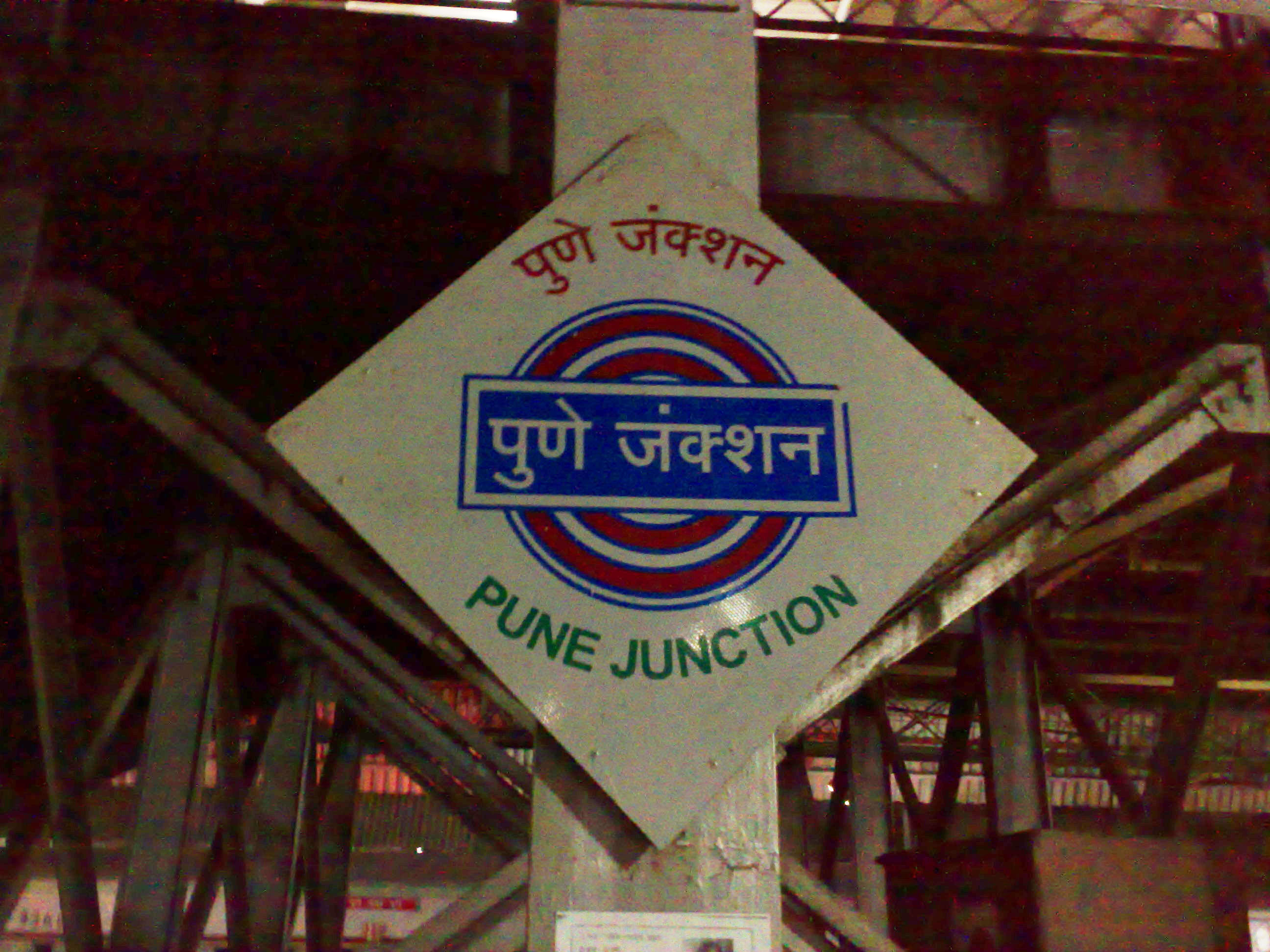
- Pune Junction, an important railway station on Dadar–Solapur section

Overview
- Status: Operational
- Owner: Indian Railways
- Locale: Maharashtra
- Termini: Dadar; Solapur

Service
- Type: Indian Railways Station
- Services: Mumbai–Chennai line
- Operator: Central Railway
- Depot(s): Kalyan, Badlapur, Pune, Lonavla
- Rolling stock: WDM-2, WDM-3A, WDM-3D, WDG-3A and WDG-4 diesel locos. WCAM-2, WCAM-3, WCAG-1, WAG-5, WAG-7, WAG-9 and WCM-6 electric locos.

History
- Opened: 1860

Technical
- Track length: Main line:446 km (277 mi); Branch lines: Kurduvadi-Latur 153 km (95 mi); Kurduvadi-Miraj 190 km (118 mi)
- Number of tracks: 2/1
- Track gauge: 5 ft 6 in (1,676 mm) broad gauge
- Electrification: Main line: 25 kV 50 Hz AC overhead lines
- Operating speed: Main line: up to 130 km/h
- Highest elevation: Lonavala 622 metres (2,041 ft)

Dadar–Solapur section is part of the Mumbai–Chennai line. It connects Dadar and Solapur both in the Indian state of Maharashtra.

== History ==
The first passenger train in India from Chhatrapati Shivaji Maharaj Terminus in Mumbai to Thane ran on 16 April 1853 on the track laid by the Great Indian Peninsula Railway. The GIPR line was extended to Kalyan Junction in 1854 and then on the south-east side to Khopoli via Palasdhari at the foot of the Western Ghats in 1856. While construction work was in progress across the Bhor Ghat, GIPR opened to public the Khandala–Pune Junction track in 1858.

The Bhor Ghat incline connecting Palasdari to Khandala was completed in 1862, thereby connecting Mumbai and Pune. The Western Ghats presented a big obstacle to the railway engineers in the 1860s. The summit of the Bhor Ghat (earlier spelt as Bhore Ghat) incline being 2,027 feet. The maximum gradient was: 1 in 37 with extreme curvature. "The works on the Bhore ghat comprised 25 tunnels of a total length of nearly 4,000 yards, two of the longest being 435 yards and 341 yards respectively. The Bhore ghat have eight lofty viaducts having a total length of 2,961 feet. Two of the largest are more than 500 feet long with a maximum height of 1160 and 163 feet. There are 22 bridges of spans from 7 to 30 feet and 81 culverts of various sizes." The construction of the Bhor Ghat incline came at a high price: an estimated 24,000 builders died during the eight years of construction. That is roughly one dead builder per meter of railway line - or an average of 8 dead builders per day for a time span of 8 years - an incredible death toll made possible by the neglect and carelessness of British colonialists.

The Pune–Raichur sector of the Mumbai–Chennai line was opened in stages: the portion from Pune to Barshi Road was opened in 1859, from Barshi Road to Mohol in 1860 and from Mohol to Solapur also in 1860. Work on the line from Solapur southwards was begun in 1865 and the line was extended to Raichur in 1871.

The 1,676 mm (5 ft 6 in) Manmad–Daund line was opened in 1878 and connected the two main sections (the south-east and north east) of GIPR.

Barsi Light Railway was a 202-mile (325 km) long, 2 ft 6 in (762 mm)-wide railway from Kurduvadi Junction to Latur. It was opened in 1897 on a 22-mile (35 km) long railway track from Barsi Road to Barsi, and extended in stages. The narrow-gauge line from Barsi Road to Pandharpur was extended to Miraj in 1927. Gauge conversion from 2 ft 6 in (762 mm) to 5 ft 6 in (1,676 mm) of the Miraj-Latur track and extension of the new line to Latur Road was taken up in 1992 and completed in stages. The last phase of the 375-kilometre (233 mi) long project was completed in 2008.

== Electrification ==
Railway electrification in India began with the first electric train, between Bombay Victoria Terminus and Kurla by the Great Indian Peninsula Railway's (GIPR) on 3 February 1925, on 1.5 kV DC. The Kalyan–Pune section was electrified with 1.5 kV DC overhead system in 1930.

The previously used 1.5 kV DC was converted to 25 kV AC on 5 May 2013 from Kalyan to Khopoli and Kalyan to Kasara. Conversion from 1.5 kV DC to 25 kV AC on the Lokmanya Tilak Terminus-Thane-Kalyan section was completed on 12 January 2014. The CSMT to LTT section was converted from 1.5 kV DC to 25 kV AC on 8 June 2015. The Kasara-Pune section was also converted from 1.5 kV DC to 25 kV AC.

The Pune–Daund section as well as Daund-Bhigwan section was electrified in 2017. The electrification of the Bhigwan-Kalaburgi section was completed on 25 March 2022. With this, the Mumbai Chennai section is fully electrified. In September 2022, the entire Mumbai-Chennai section was also doubled.

== Speed limit ==
The Kalyan–Pune–Daund-Wadi line is classified as 'Group B' line and can take speeds up to 130 km/h. However, the stretch between Chhatrapati Shivaji Terminus and Kalyan Junction is classified as 'Group A' lines, where trains can take speed up to 160 km/h.

== Loco sheds ==
Kalyan diesel loco shed houses WDM-2, WDM-3A, WDM-3D, WDP 4D, WDG-3A and WDG-4 locos. Kalyan electric loco shed houses WAP-7, WCAM-2, WCAM-3, WCAG-1, WAG-5, WAG-7 and WAG-9 locos. Pune diesel loco shed houses 175+ locos. These include WDM-2, WDM-3A, WDM-3D, WDG-3A, WDP-4D and WDG-4 locos. Pune trip shed houses WAP-4, WAP-5, WAP-7, WCAM-2/2P, WCAM-3 and WCAG-1 locos. Pune has one trip shed for WDS-4 shunters and another for Pune–Lonavla EMUs. Lonavla has an AC trip shed for Bhor Ghat bankers. Kurduwadi had a narrow gauge diesel loco shed for Barsi Light Railway. The shed was closed down after conversion to the broad-gauge railway. Historic stock included the WCG-2, WCM-1, WCM-2, WCM-3, WCM-4, WCM-5, WCP-1, WCP-2, WCP-3, and WCP-4 electric locomotives. Also a new loco shed is under construction in Daund.

== Workshop ==
Kurduwadi Workshop was set up for repair of narrow-gauge steam locomotives, coaches and wagons by Barsi Light Railway in 1930. After conversion to the broad gauge, Kurduwadi Workshop now undertakes rehabilitation of 20 broad-gauge wagons per month.

== Passenger movement ==
Dadar, Pune and Solapur on this line, are amongst the top hundred booking stations of Indian Railway.
