= Bhor Ghat =

Mountain pass in Maharashtra, India

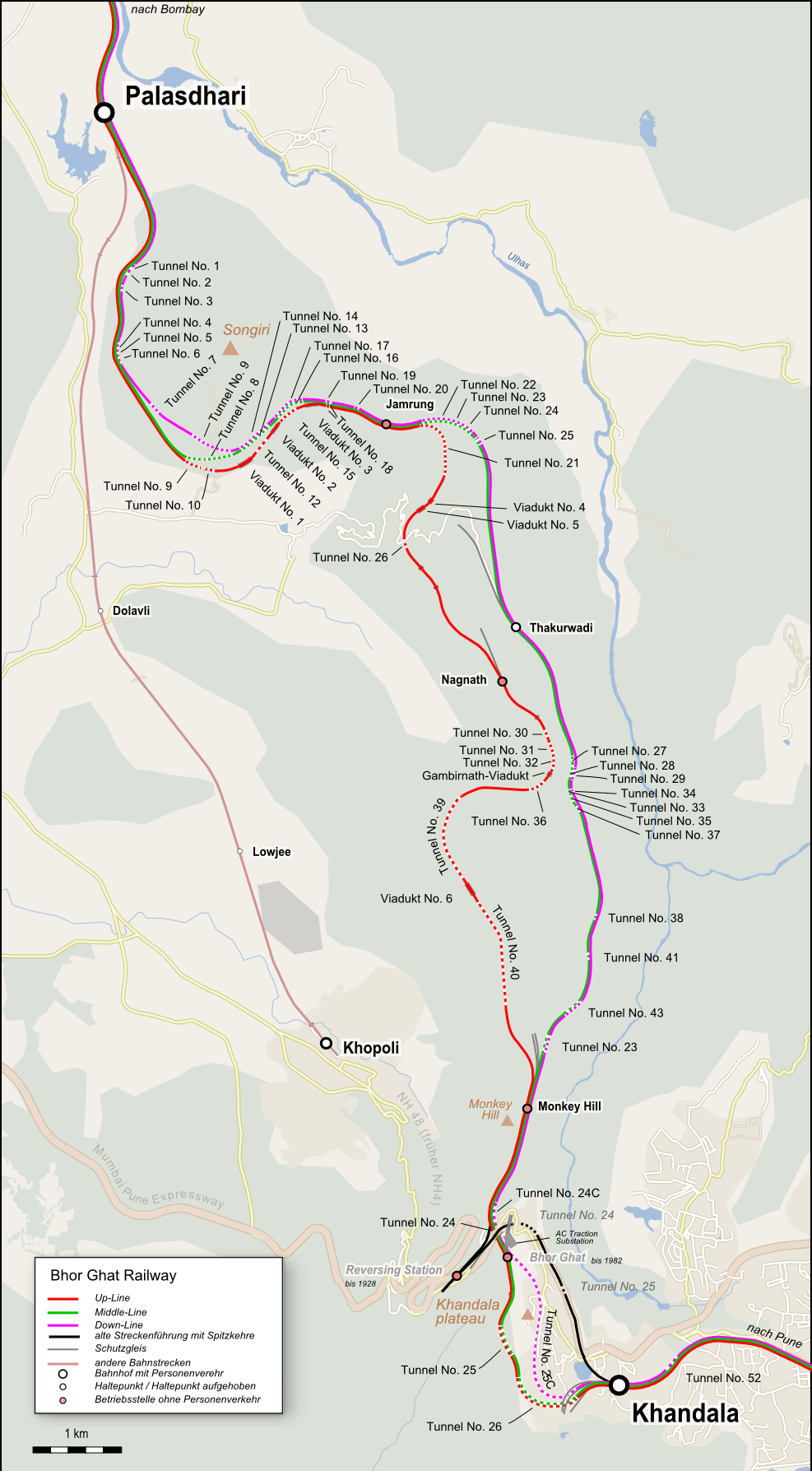
- Bhor ghat map

- Location within Maharashtra
- Elevation: 622 metres (2,041 ft)

Location
- Location: Maharashtra, India
- Range: Sahyadri
- Coordinates: 18.46°N 73.22°E

Bhor Ghat is a mountain pass located between Palasdhari and Khandala for railway and between Khopoli and Khandala on the road route in Maharashtra, India, on the crest of the Western Ghats.

== History ==
In February 1781, Bhorghat was the site of a battle between the Maratha Empire centered in Poona and the foreign powers in Bombay. They dispatched a large force to capture Pune, which had to pass through the Bhorghat pass, where they were intercepted by Maratha forces. In the battle that ensued, the Marathas inflicted a crushing defeat on the British in what would be known as the Battle of Bhorghat.

The discovery of a route to make a motorable pass in Bhor Ghat came after information was provided by a local Dhangar tribesman called Shigroba. Later, the Great Indian Peninsula Railway laid a railway line from Mumbai to Pune. The section through Bhor Ghat with 28 tunnels, and old bridges was opened in 1863. The Ghat opened Mumbai to the Deccan plains of Peninsular India.

Building a railway over the Bhor ghat was an exercise in imperial engineering, as noted in an article in Engineering Magazine in 1899, where it was described as "a more certain and enduring form of attack than military power, and that the railway, the canal and harbour are the real weapons in the conquest of a colony."^{p. 347}

The number of staff during construction increased from 10,000 in 1856, over 20,000 in 1857 to a peak of 42,000 in January 1861. The original incline included building 25 tunnels, eight arched masonry viaducts, blasting and removing of 54 mio cubic feet (1.5 mio m^{3}) of hard rock and building embankments from 67.5 mio cubic feet (1.9 million m^{3}) of material at a total cost of £ 1,100,000, i.e. £70,000 per mile.^{p. 352}

The project was marred by industrial unrest, disease and accidents. As many as 24,000 workers died during the project. The first contractor awarded the section, William Frederick Faviell, mistreated his workers and underpaid his subcontractors, leading to riots by the workers that resulted in the death of one of the European managers attempting to subdue the unrest. Following a Government investigation, Faviell's contract was taken away from him and granted to Solomon Tredwell, who arrived in 1859 to restart the works. Tredwell died within days, of dysentery or cholera. His wife, Alice then took over the contract, completing it with success by 1863.

During the grand ceremony at the official opening, which was held at Khandala near the highest point of the incline on 21 April 1863, the governor of Bombay, Sir Bartle Frere, gave a speech, in which he felt "assured, that in the future ages the works of our English engineers on these Ghats will take the place of those works of their demigods, the great cave temples of western India, which have so long, to the simple inhabitants of these lands, been the type of superhuman strength, and of more than mortal constructive skill."^{p. 351}

On early morning of 26 January 1869 Bhor Ghat rail accident occurred at the Bhor Ghat Reversing Station when Mumbai–Pune Mail train sustained a brake failure on incline track and crashed through a dead-end of the station track down the railway embankment. The event is recorded as one of the first major rail accidents in the history of rail transport in India.

== Rail ==
The Bhor Ghat Railway is a part of the Mumbai–Chennai line and cuts a distance of 21 km between Khandala and Palasdari. There are 28 tunnels across the railway ghat. This ghat comes under the proposed Golden Quadrilateral Freight Corridors. During construction of this ghat almost 25,000 workers lost their lives due to steepness of this ghat.^{p. 343} Initially steam traction was used to haul trains across this ghat. In 1929–30 the Great Indian Peninsula Railway electrified Mumbai – Pune section with a 1.5 kV DC system. This led to end of steam era on this ghat. The electrification system of the Mumbai – Pune section completed its conversion to a 25 kV 50 Hz AC system in June 2015.

The first DC locomotives were EF/1 class locomotives (later classified as WCG1) for freight trains. Later Express trains were hauled by EA/1 class locomotives (later classified as WCP1). all the passenger and goods train will have back engines like WAG-7 or WCAM-3 pushing up the hill between Karjat and Lonava

Reversing station

There used to be a reversing station on this ghat which trains of Great Indian Peninsula Railway (GIPR) used earlier. This was shut down due to new tunnels on the ghat. The reversing station was located between Monkey Hill and Khandala after tunnel no. 26. During night time lights of Khopoli can be seen from here.

Railway cabins on Bhor Ghat
#	Station name			Description	km
#	English	Marathi	Station code	Description	km
1	Jambrung	जांबरुंग	JBC	Start	4
2	Thakurvadi	ठाकुरवाडी	TKW	Minor halt	9
3	Monkey Hill	मंकी हिल	MNLC	Technical halt, no tickets issued	16

== Road ==
The road ghat lies between Khopoli and Khandala and is 18 km long. There are six lanes on the Mumbai – Pune express highway and four lanes on the old Mumbai–Pune road. There is a proposal to dig two four-lane tunnels between Khalapur toll booth near Khopoli and Sinhagad institute, Lonavala to bypass this ghat on Mumbai – Pune express-way which will be expanded from six-lane to eight-lane road. Similarly, old Mumbai – Pune highway will use the existing express highway route and will be expanded from four to six lanes. This will also reduce the distance on express highway by 6 km i.e. from 18 km to 12 km.

== Gallery ==
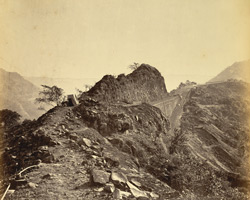
Bhor Ghat in 1870

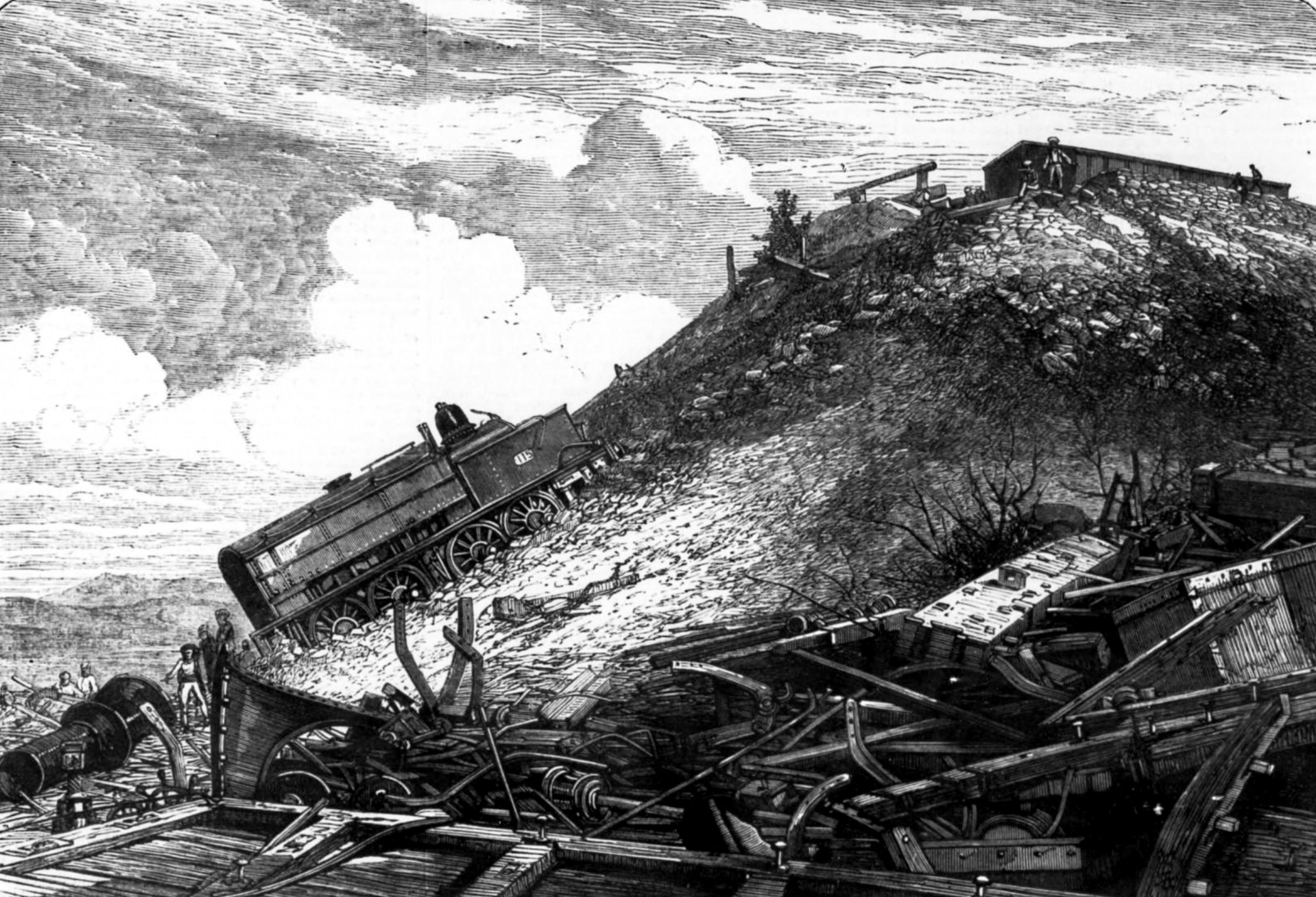
Bhor Ghat rail accident (1869)

== See also ==
- Thal Ghat
