= Alice Tredwell =

English railway contractor and photographer

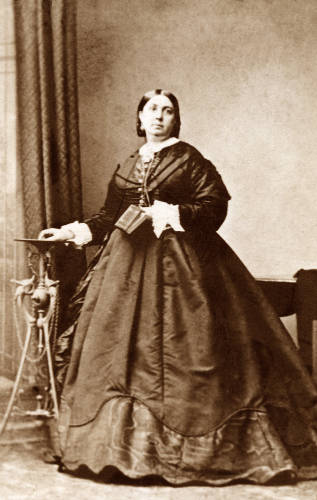
Portrait of Alice Tredwell (1823-1867), contractor on the Great Indian Peninsular Railway

Alice Tredwell (née Pickering; 1823 – 14 June 1867) was an English railway contractor and photographer. She is best known for the completion of the Bhor Ghat section of the Great Indian Peninsular Railway line between Mumbai and Pune in 1863.

Alice Pickering was born in Leek, Staffordshire, in 1823. She married Solomon Tredwell, a railway contractor, in Leeds in 1846. Awarded the construction of the Bhor Ghat section of the Great Indian Peninsular Railway, Alice and Solomon arrived in India in 1859. Solomon died of dysentery or cholera within a month.

Alice Tredwell took up the contract with a remarkable "degree of spirit and judgment", assigning the Railway's engineers Swainston Adamson and George Louis Clowser to manage the construction. The construction was completed by 1863.

Tredwell photographed much of the Bhor Ghat landscape and the development of the line.

Adamson and Clowser continued to work for Tredwell's company, extending the Peninsular railway towards Madras, constructing the section between Sholapur and Gulbarga.

Alice Tredwell returned to England in 1860. She had inherited £70,000 from her husband. Her only surviving daughter Alice Martha Elizabeth got married in 1866.

Tredwell died in Ryde on the Isle of Wight on 14 June 1867.
