= Palasdari =

Palasdari, also known as Padusdhurree during the British Raj is a tourist destination and a railway station on Karjat-Khopoli route of Mumbai Suburban Railway. The name Palasdari is derived from Palas, meaning “tree” and Dari means "Valley" in the Marathi language. It is situated on Karjat-Khopoli State Highway No. 35. Palasdari has a well known Palasdari dam. It is frequented by people from Mumbai, Panvel and Navi Mumbai particularly during rainy season. The whole area is surrounded by waterfalls and greenery during monsoon.

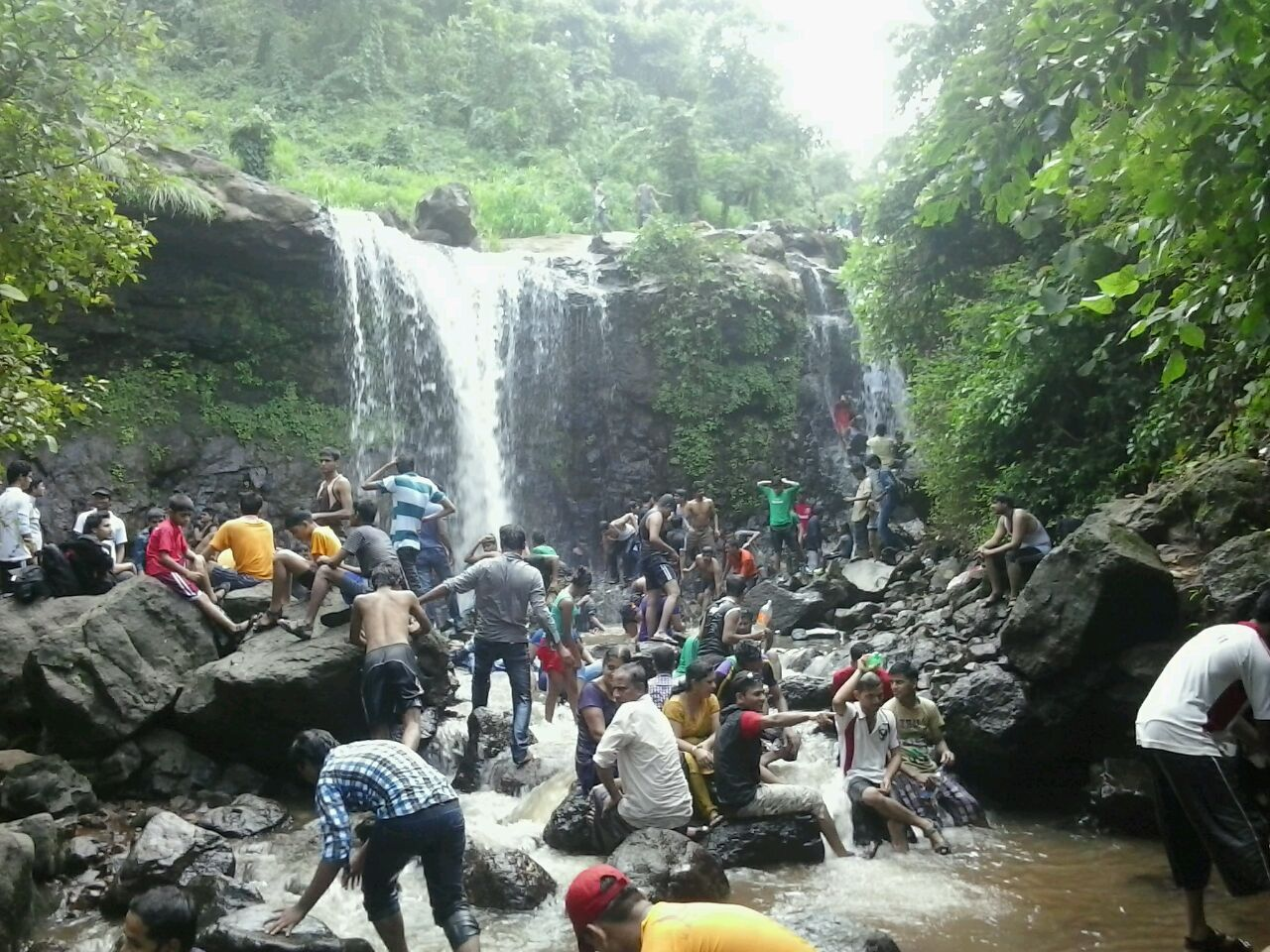
Palasdari waterfall

An attraction of Palasdari is "Math" of Shree Swami Samarth Maharaj Akkalkot. This scenic location is open to the public from 6:00 am to 9:00 pm every day.

Ministry of Railways (Central Railways has started work im March 2022 as a Green Field "Gati Shakti" Multi-ModelCargo Terminal. This Mega terminal will give GatiShakti to both inward and outward containerised and non containerised freight traffic.

Palasdari is known for its scenery and rough terrain, thorny bushes are in abundance in Palasdari which can be dangerous to reckless travellers. Palasdari has a number of old temples which date from before the British Raj in India.

In the village there's a waterfall called Palasdari waterfall. The waterfall is not much hard to climb for a basic trekker, but in the rainy season the path becomes difficult to travel due to heavy waves of water.

== Palasdari Dam ==
Palasdari dam
- Location within Maharashtra Location within India
- Coordinates: 18.88074°N 73.3184523°E
- Purpose: Support railway

Reservoir
- Surface area: 40 acres, more or less

Palasdari dam is a water body constructed by Indian Railways for the requirement of the adjoining Karjat terminus. This dam is near Palasdari railway station and Palasdari town. It is a picnic spot as well as a monsoon gate away. Many farm houses are located nearby. It is situated on Karjat-Khopoli state highway.
