= Lowjee railway station =

Railway Station in Maharashtra, India

Lowjee Railway Station लौजी रेल्वे स्थानक
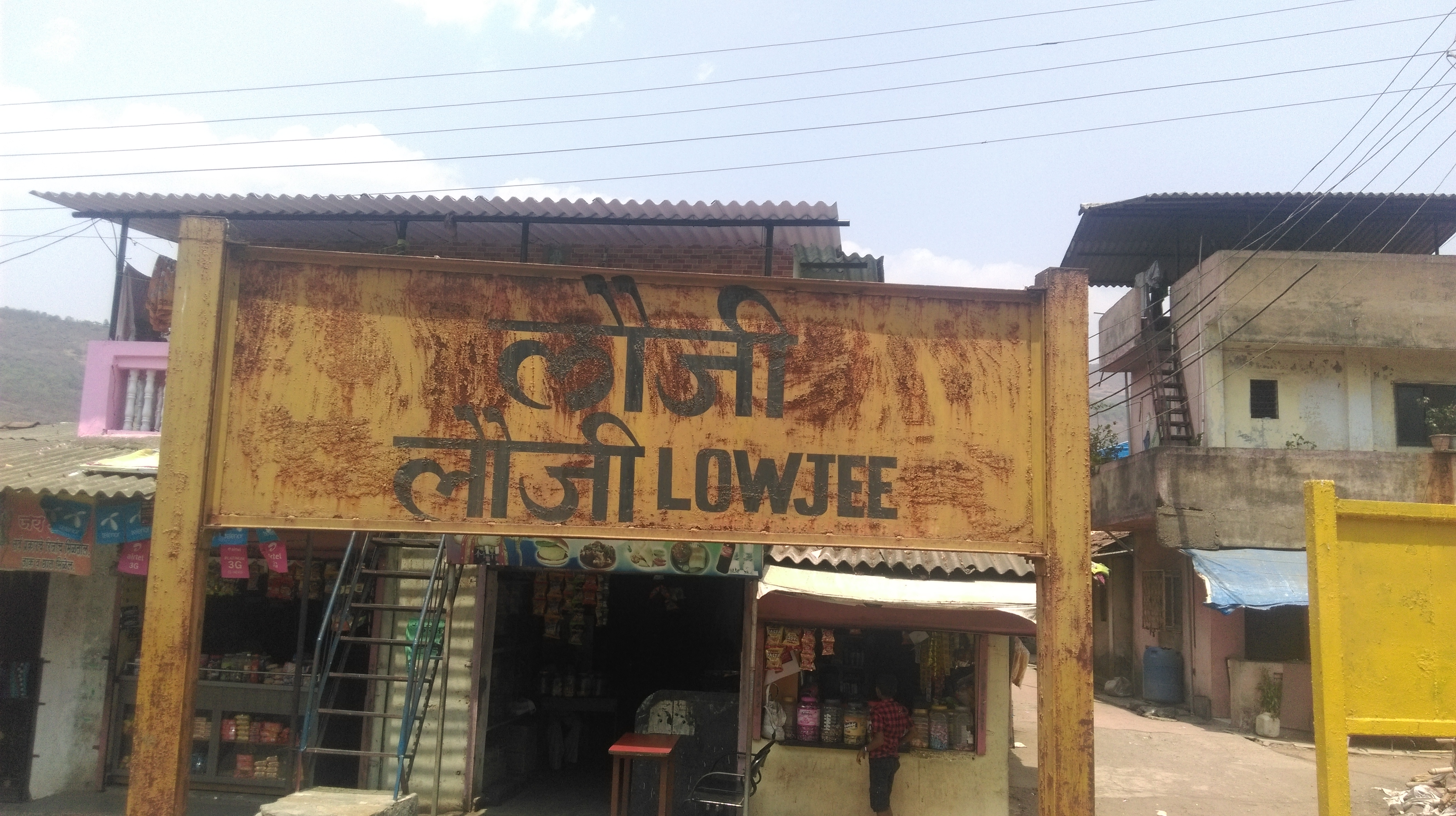

General information
- Coordinates: 18.809955°N 73.335006°E
- Elevation: 68.61 metres (225.1 ft)
- System: Indian Railways and Mumbai Suburban Railway station
- Owner: Ministry of Railways, Indian Railways
- Line: Central Line
- Platforms: 1
- Tracks: 1

Construction
- Structure type: Standard, on ground

Other information
- Status: Active
- Station code: LWJ
- Fare zone: Central Railways

Services
Preceding station	Mumbai Suburban Railway	Following station
Dolavli towards Chhatrapati Shivaji Terminus	Central line	Khopoli Terminus
Route map
Location
- Location within India Location within Maharashtra

Lowjee railway station (station code: LWJ) is a railway station on the Central line of the Mumbai Suburban Railway network. It is on the Karjat–Khopoli route. Dolavli is the previous station and Khopoli is the next station.
