= Khandala railway station =

Railway Station in Maharashtra, India

Khandala
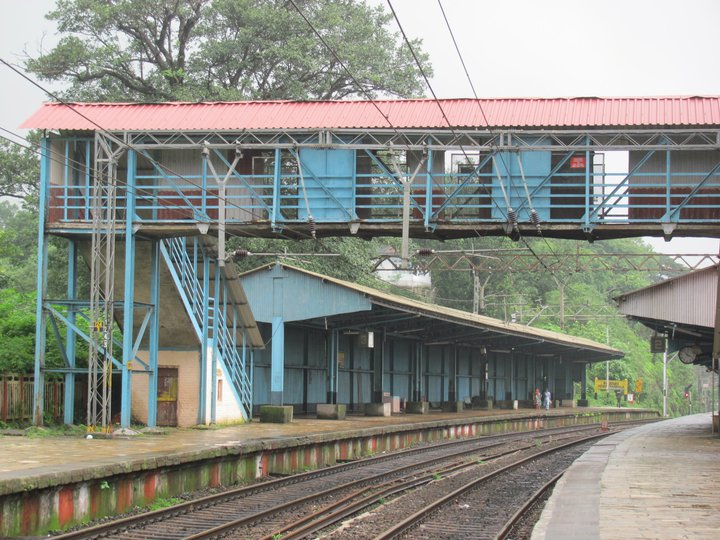
- Khandala railway station

General information
- Location: Khandala, Tal. Maval, Dist. Pune. India
- Coordinates: 18.7548°N 73.3769°E
- Elevation: 545.000 metres (1,788.058 ft)
- System: Indian Railways station
- Owner: Indian Railways
- Lines: Mumbai–Chennai; Dadar–Solapur section
- Platforms: 3
- Tracks: 3

Construction
- Parking: Yes

Other information
- Status: Active
- Station code: KAD
- Fare zone: Central Railway
Location
- Location within India Location within Maharashtra

Khandala railway station is a local station for Khandala town, a twin hill stations of Lonavala – Khandala, in Pune district in Maharashtra, India. The Station code is KAD. It has three platforms,

It is the very next station (towards Pune) to Lonavala from where Pune Suburban Service starts. Khandala Ghat starts after this station towards Mumbai.

== Trains ==
1. 11007/08 Deccan Express
2. 11009/10 Sinhagad Express
3. 11019/20 Konark Express
4. 11023/24 Sahyadri Express
5. 11029/30 Koyna Express
6. 11301/02 Udyan Express
7. 12115/16 Siddheshwar Express
8. 12125/26 Pragati Express
9. 12701/02 Hussainsagar Express
10. 17411/12 Mahalaxmi Express
11. 22105/06 Indrayani Express
12. 22107/08 Latur Express
13. 51033/34 Shirdi Fast Passenger

=== Passengers ===
1. Pune–Karjat Passenger
2. Pune–Mumbai Passenger
3. Mumbai–Bijapur Passenger
4. Mumbai–Pandharpur Passenger
5. Mumbai–Shirdi Passenger

== Gallery ==
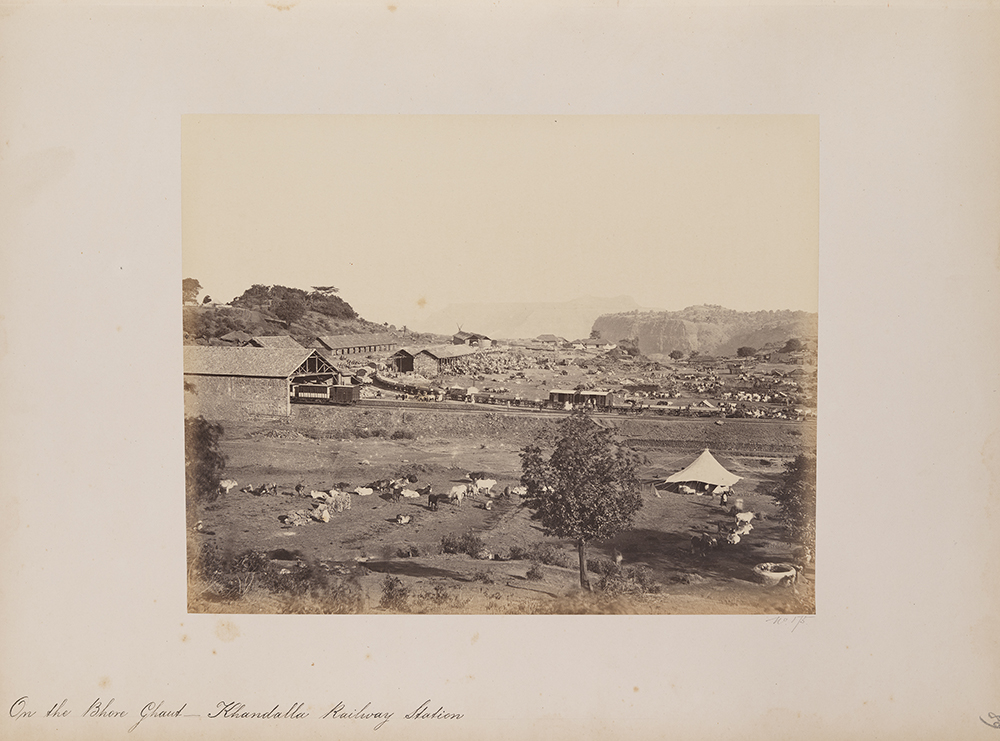
Khandala Raiway Station (circa 1860)

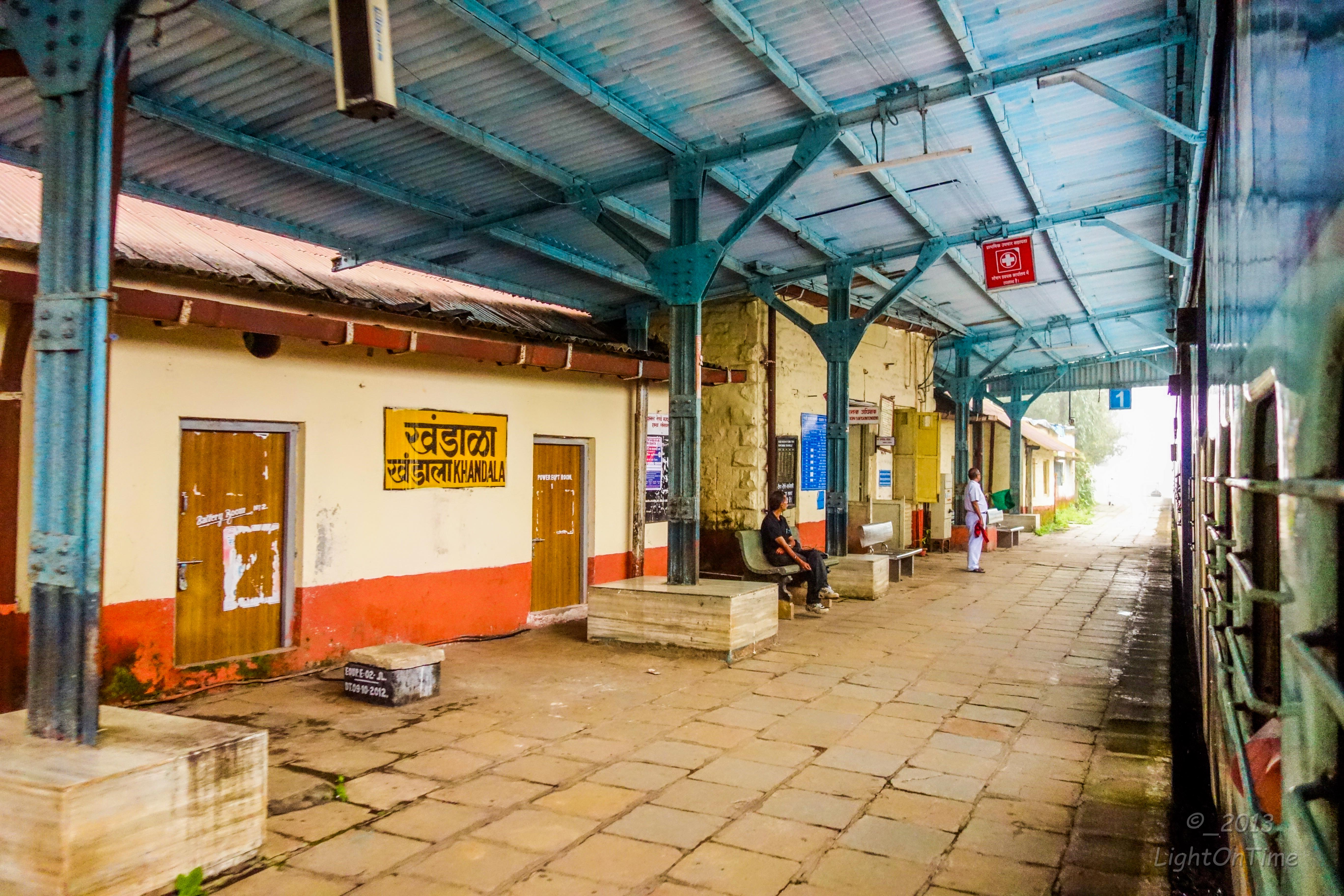
Khandala Station Platform

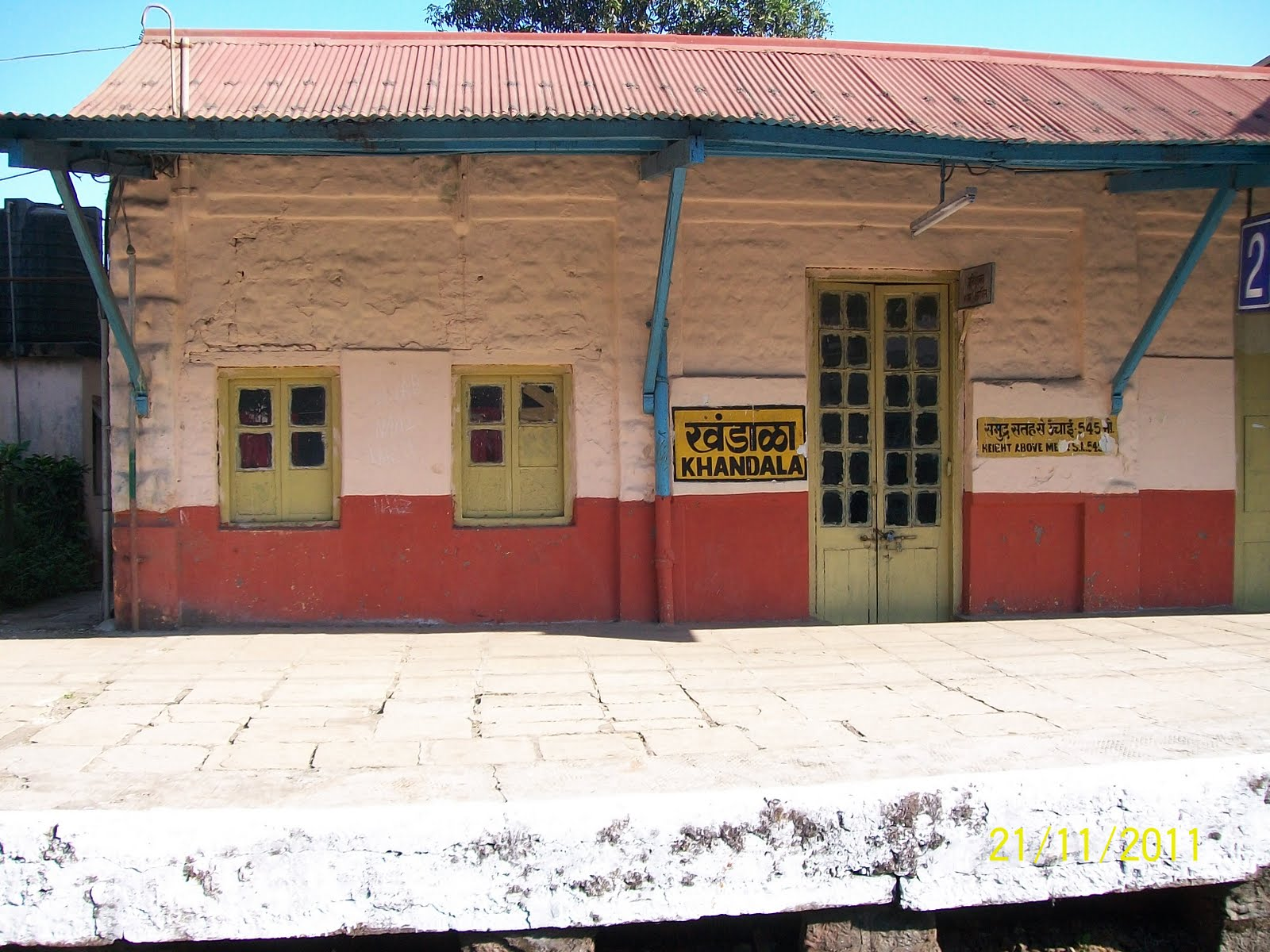
Old Platform Building at Khandala Station

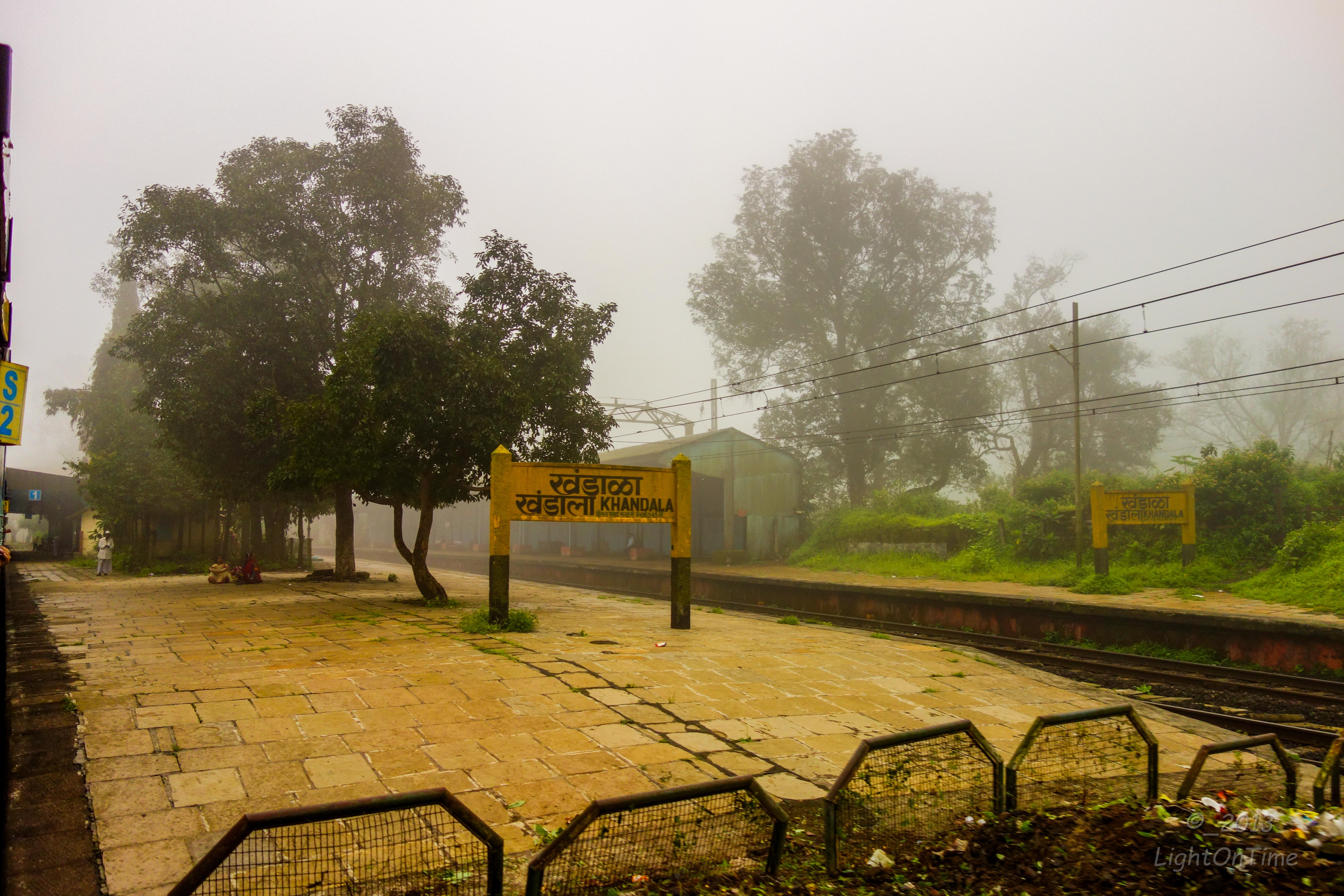
Khandala Station Platform view

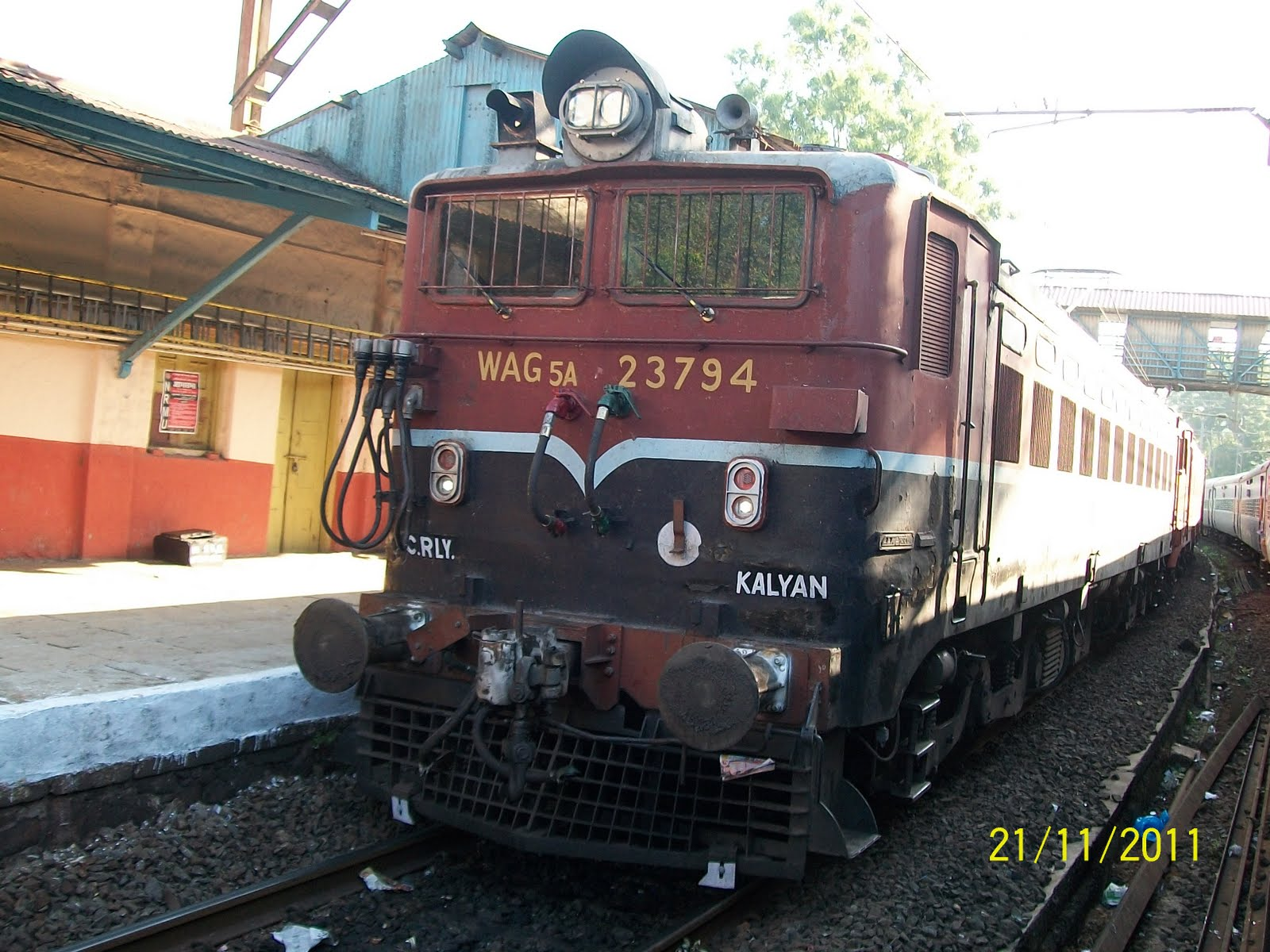
Train arriving at Khandala Station

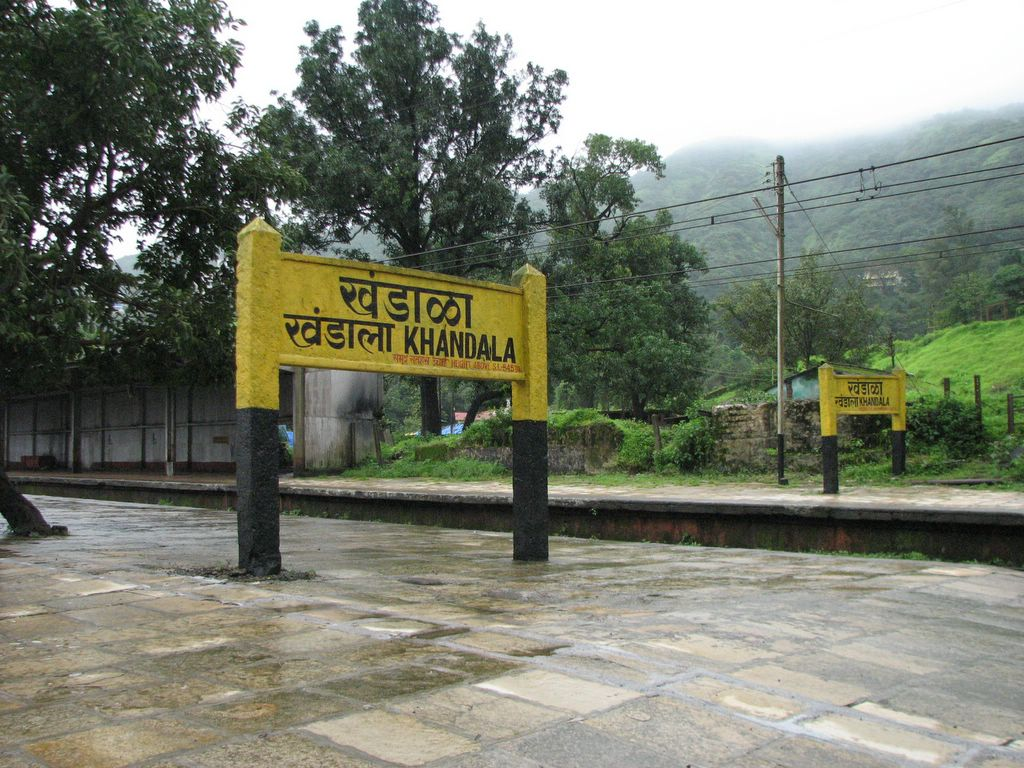
Khandala Station Platform Board
