= Palasdhari railway station =

Image of Palasdari (or Palasdhari) railway station

Palasdhari पळसधरी
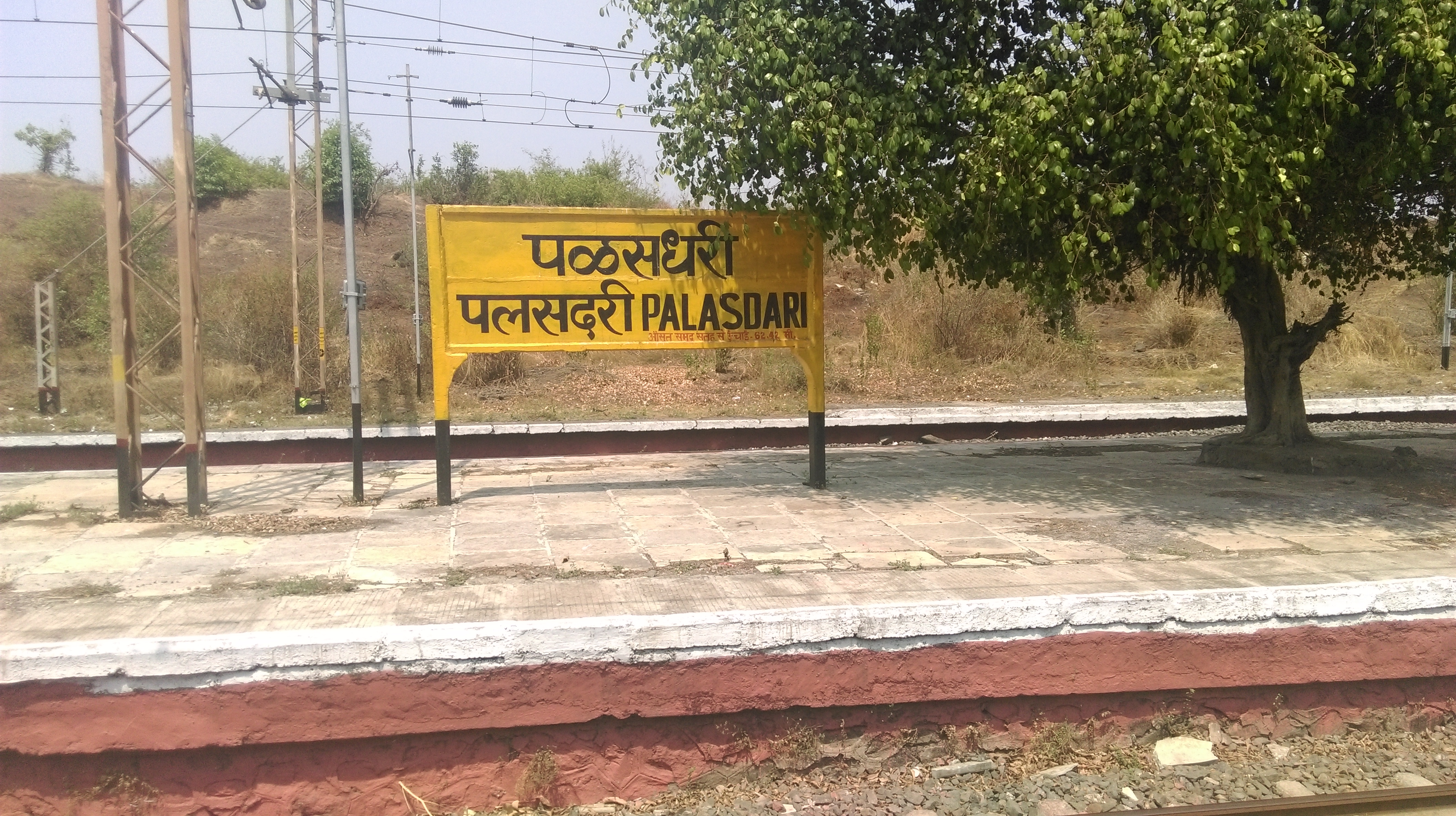

General information
- Other names: Palasdari
- Coordinates: 18°53′4″N 73°19′15″E
- Elevation: 62.42 metres (204.8 ft)
- System: Indian Railways and Mumbai Suburban Railway station
- Owner: Ministry of Railways, Indian Railways
- Lines: Central Line; Mumbai Dadar–Solapur section

Other information
- Status: Active
- Station code: PDI
- Fare zone: Central Railways

Services
| Preceding station | Mumbai Suburban Railway | Following station |
|---|---|---|
| Karjat towards Chhatrapati Shivaji Terminus | Central line | Kelavli towards Khopoli |
Route map
Location
- Location within India Location within Maharashtra

Palasdhari (also Palasdari, formerly Padusdhurree, station code: PDI) is a railway station on the Central line of the Mumbai Suburban Railway network.

It is also on Karjat–Lonavala line. On Khopoli route Kelavli is the next station.
