= Khopoli railway station =

Railway Station in Maharashtra, India

Khopoli Railway Station खोपोली रेल्वे स्थानक

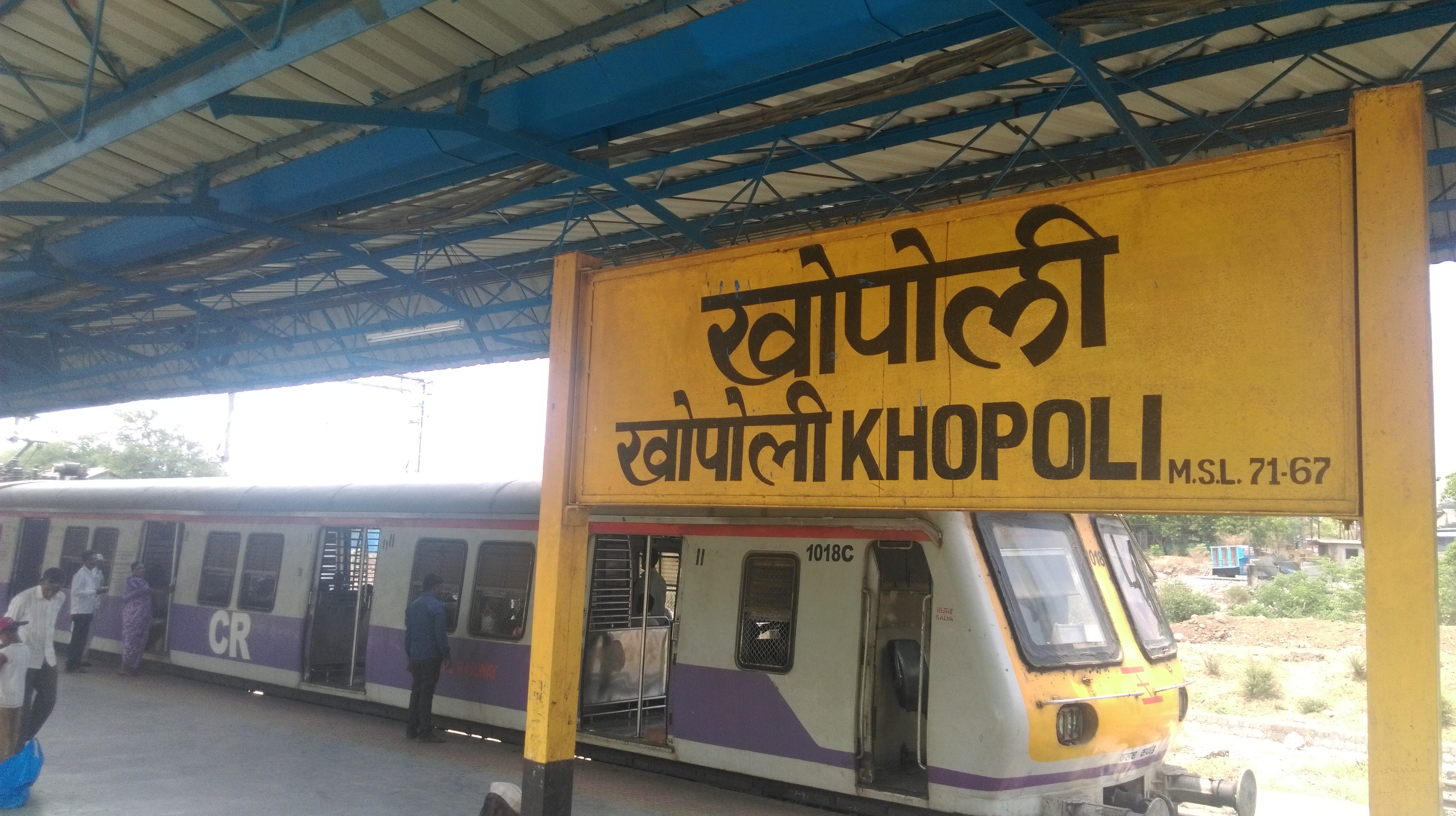

General information
- Location: Khopoli, Taluk - Khalapur, Dist - Raigad; India
- Coordinates: 18°47′22.7″N 73°20′41.4″E
- Elevation: 71.67 metres (235.1 ft)
- System: Indian Railways and Mumbai Suburban Railway station
- Owner: Ministry of Railways, Indian Railways
- Line: Central Line
- Platforms: 2 End
- Tracks: 3

Construction
- Structure type: Standard, on ground
- Parking: Yes

Other information
- Status: Active
- Station code: KHPI (Central Railways); KP (Mumbai Suburban Railway)
- Fare zone: Central Railways

History
- Opened: 12 May 1856

Services
Preceding station	Mumbai Suburban Railway	Following station
Lowjee towards Chhatrapati Shivaji Terminus	Central line	Terminus
Route map
Location
- Location within India Location within Maharashtra

Khopoli railway station (formerly Campoolie railway station, station code: KHPI on Central Railways and KP on Mumbai Suburban Railway) is a suburban railway station on the Central line of the Mumbai Suburban Railway in Mumbai, India.

== History ==
The South East extension from Callian (Kalyan) to Campoolie (Khopoli) opened on 12 May 1856, with station at Badlapur, Neral, and Khopoli. The branch to Khopoli seems to have been opened and closed multiple times over the initial years of the station.

== Gallery ==
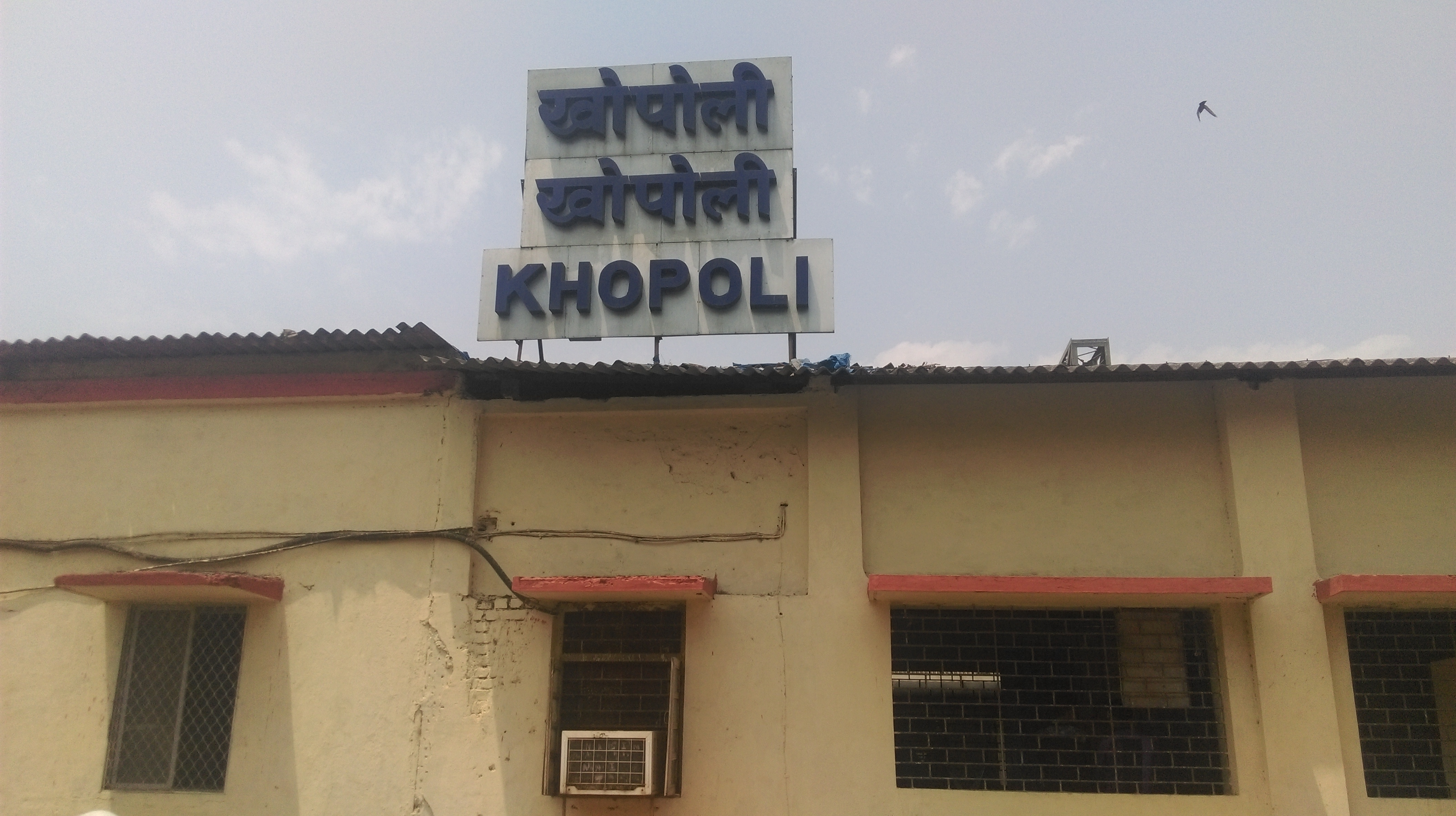
Khopoli railway station - Main Entrance

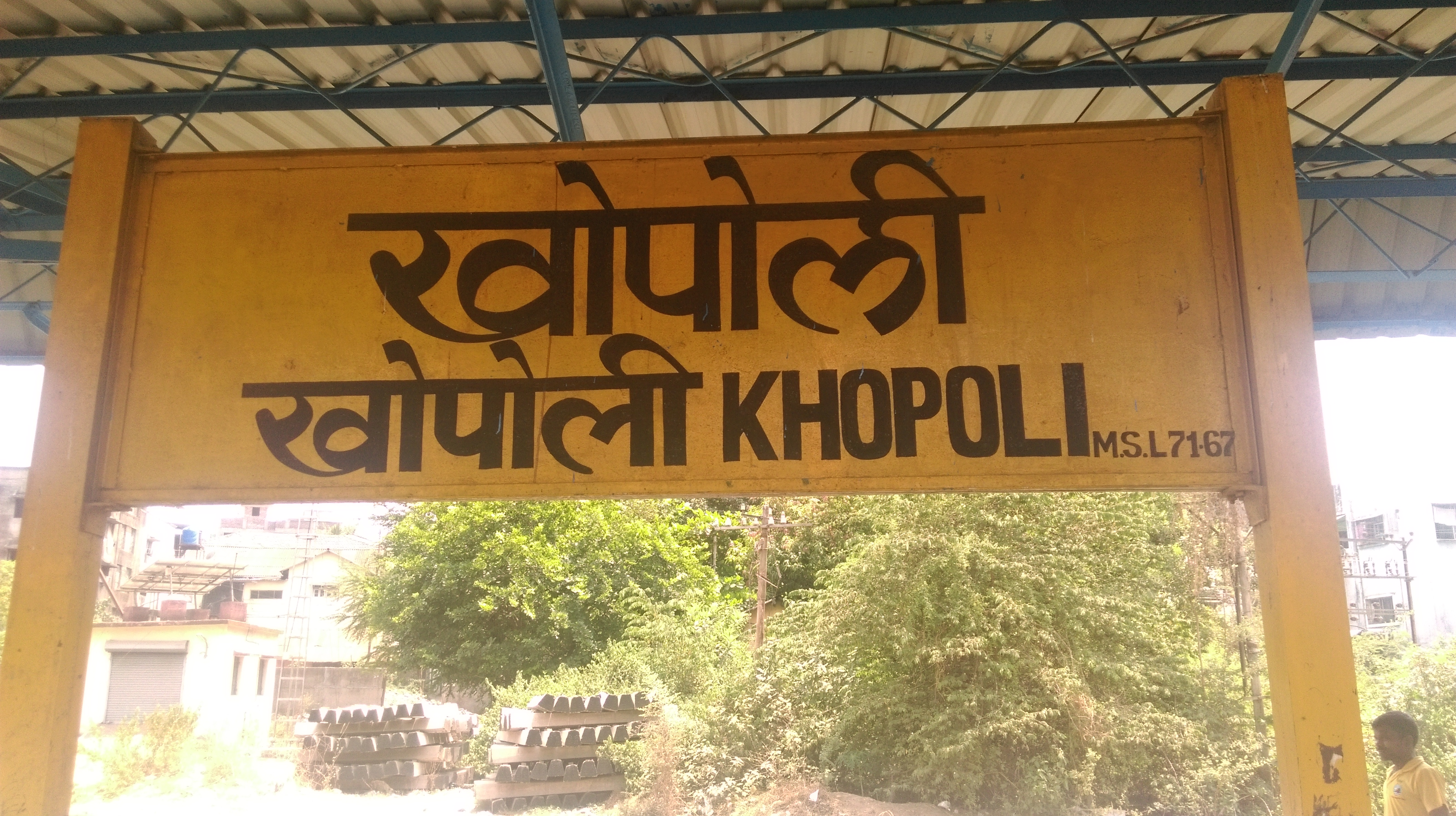
Khopoli railway station

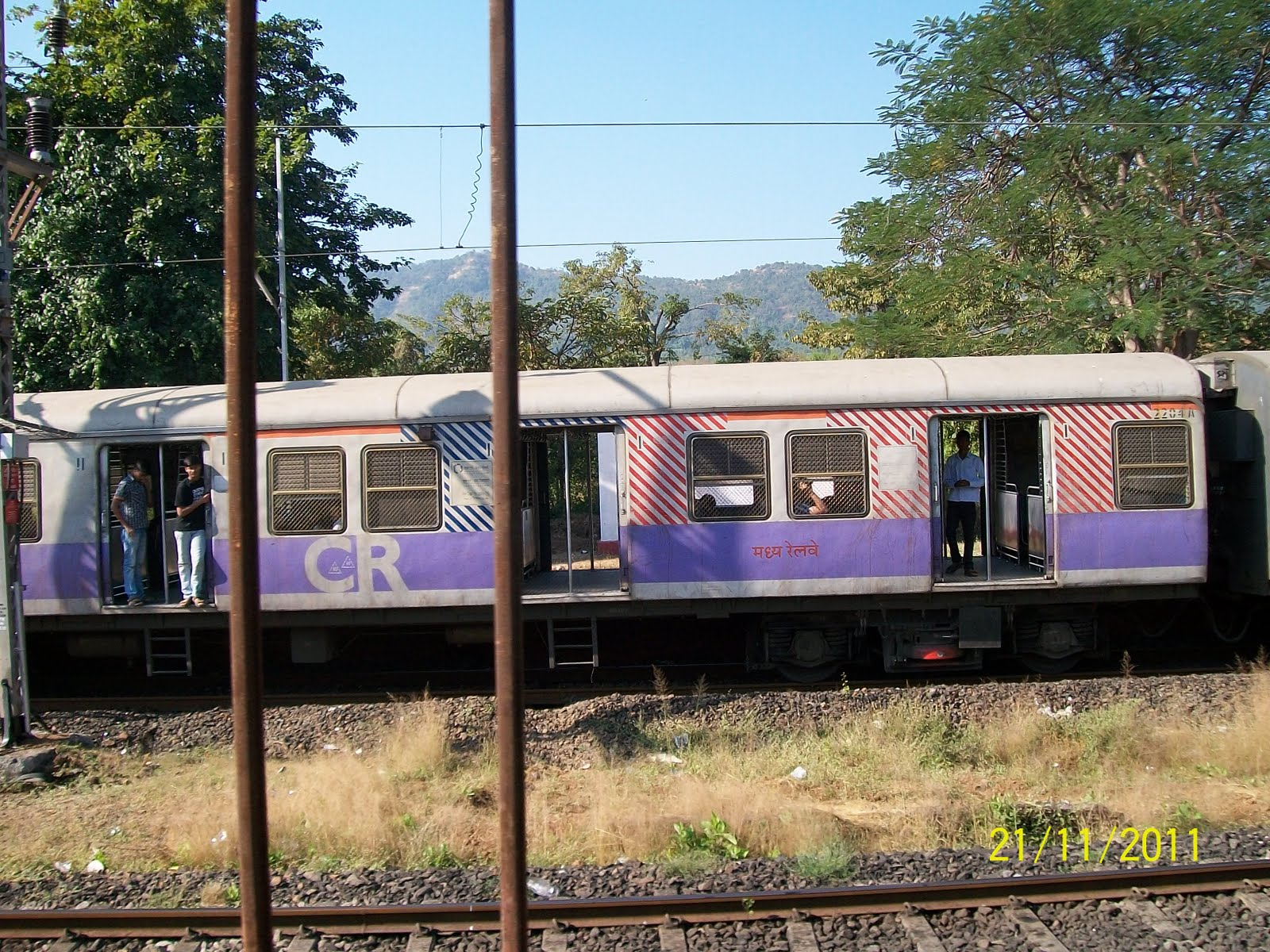
Local train at Khopoli station

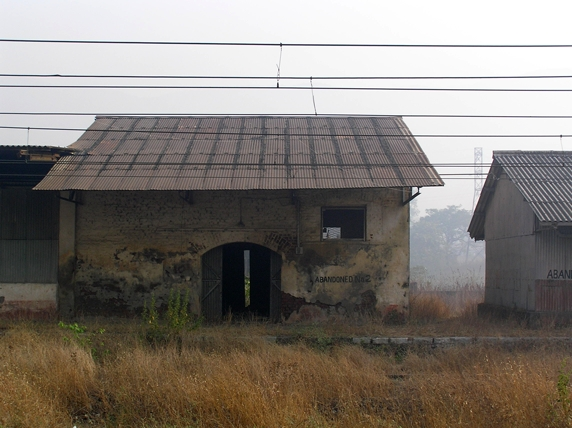
Abandoned railway shed at Khopoli
