= Indrayani Express =

Intercity train in India

Chhatrapati Shivaji Maharaj Terminus (Mumbai CSMT) - Pune Indrayani Superfast Express
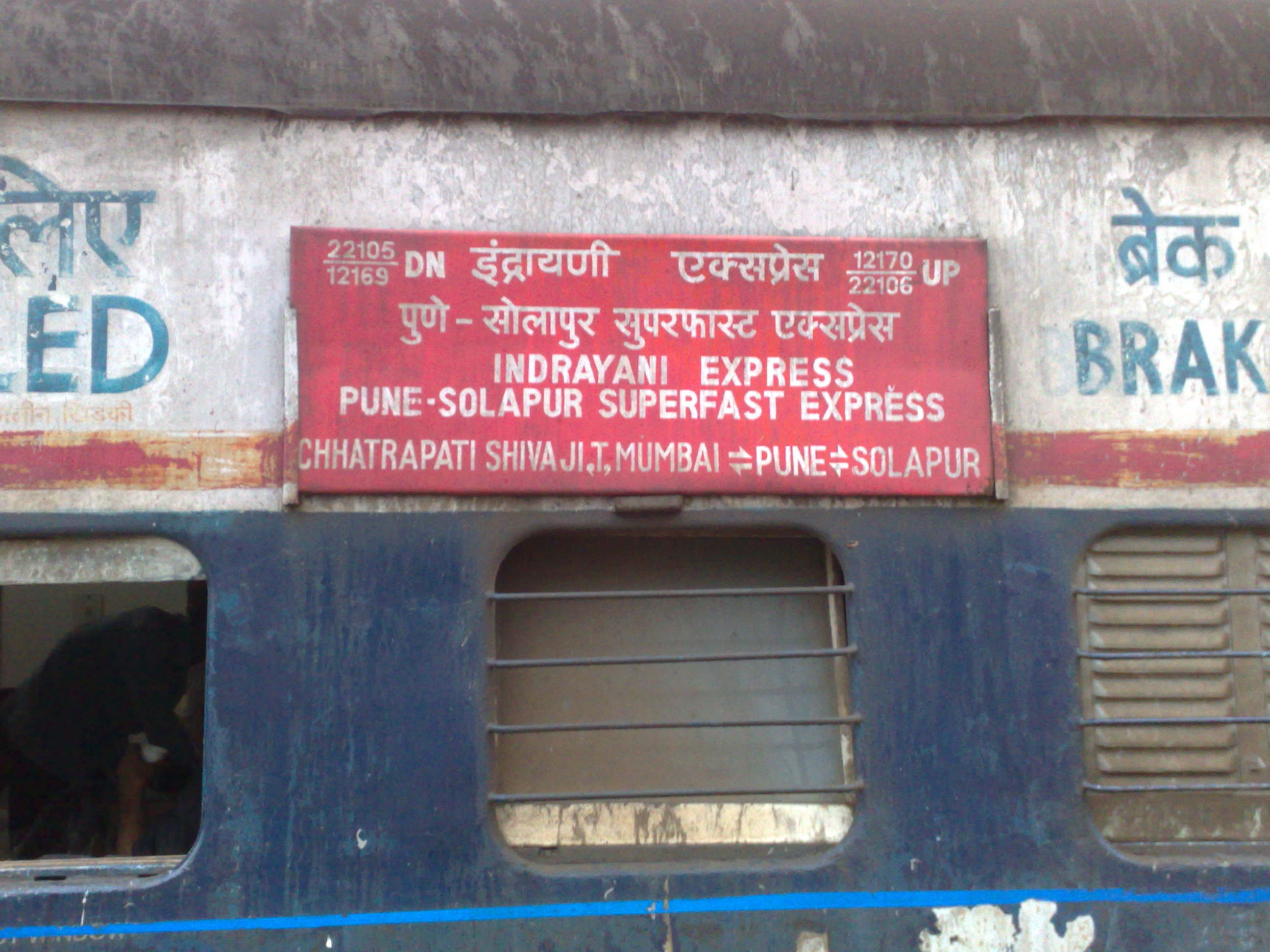

Overview
- Service type: Superfast Express
- Locale: Maharashtra
- First service: 27 April 1988
- Current operator: Central Railways

Route
- Termini: Mumbai CSMT; Pune
- Stops: 6 as 22105 Indrayani Express, 5 as 22106 Indrayani Express
- Distance travelled: 192 km (119 mi)
- Average journey time: 3 hours 28 minutes as 22105 Indrayani Express, 3 hours 20 minutes as 22106 Indrayani Express
- Service frequency: daily
- Train number: 22105 / 22106

On-board services
- Classes: AC Chair Car, Second Class sitting
- Seating arrangements: Yes
- Sleeping arrangements: No
- Catering facilities: No Pantry Car
- Observation facilities: Rake Sharing with 12169/70 Pune Solapur Intercity Express

Technical
- Rolling stock: LHB Rake
- Track gauge: 1,676 mm (5 ft 6 in)
- Operating speed: 110 km/h (68 mph) maximum 56.47 km/h (35 mph), including halts

Indrayani Express, with train numbers 22105 and 22106, is a superfast express train belonging to Indian Railways that runs between Mumbai CSMT and Pune Junction in India.

It is a daily service and is named after the river Indrayani, a culturally significant river that flows through Pune district.

== History ==
The train earlier numbered as 1021 while running from Mumbai to Pune and 1022 from Pune to Mumbai, has now been upgraded to superfast and renumbered as 22105 (Mumbai CSMT - Pune Junction) and 22106 (Pune Junction - Mumbai CSMT).

The train had white and royal blue livery with red bands. On 2 February 2020 it was upgraded to LHB coaches.

== Coaches ==
Indrayani Express has 16 LHB coaches, and the composition is as follows:

- 2 AC Chair Car
- 7 Second Seating
- 2 Unreserved MST Pass holder coaches
- 3 Unreserved General Second Class
- 1 Ladies Unreserved, Divyangjan and Brake Van
- 1 Generator Luggage and Brake Van

This train shares its rake with the Pune Solapur Intercity Express, and operational control is with Central Railways.

== Service ==
The Indrayani Express was introduced on 27 April 1988 and is one of six dedicated Intercity Chair Car trains between Mumbai CSMT and Pune Junction. The other five trains are 12127/28 Mumbai Pune Intercity Express, 11007/08 Deccan Express, 11009/10 Sinhagad Express, 12125/26 Pragati Express and 12123/24 Deccan Queen.

It covers the distance of 192 kilometres in 3 hours 25 mins as 22105 Indrayani Express (55.38 km/h) and 3 hours 20 mins as 22106 Indrayani Express (57.60 km/h).

It halts as 22105 at Dadar, Thane, Kalyan, Karjat, Lonavala, Shivaji Nagar and Pune. In the return service as 22106, it halts at Lonavala, Karjat, Kalyan, Thane, Dadar and Mumbai CSMT.

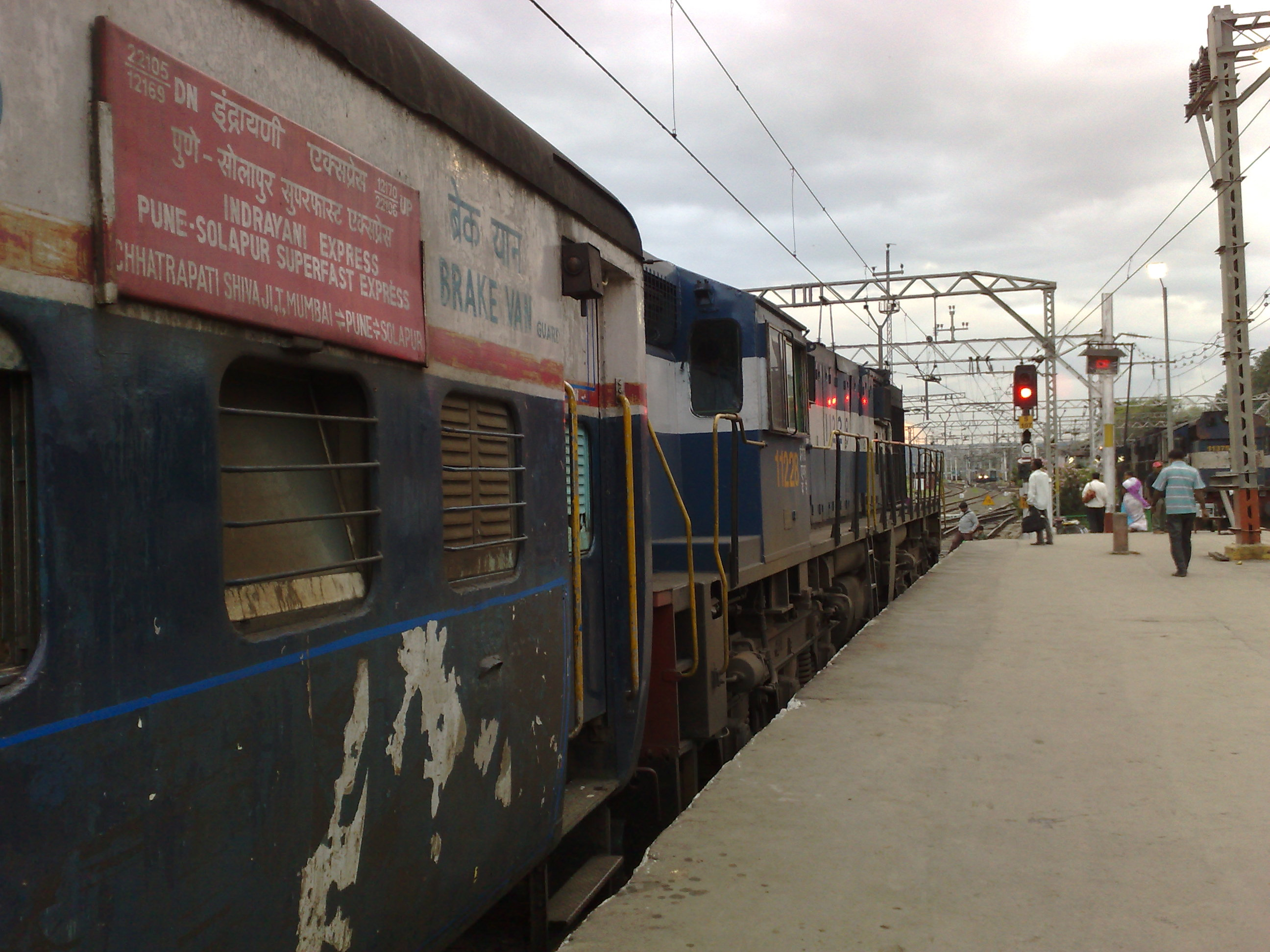
22106 Indrayani Express at Pune Junction

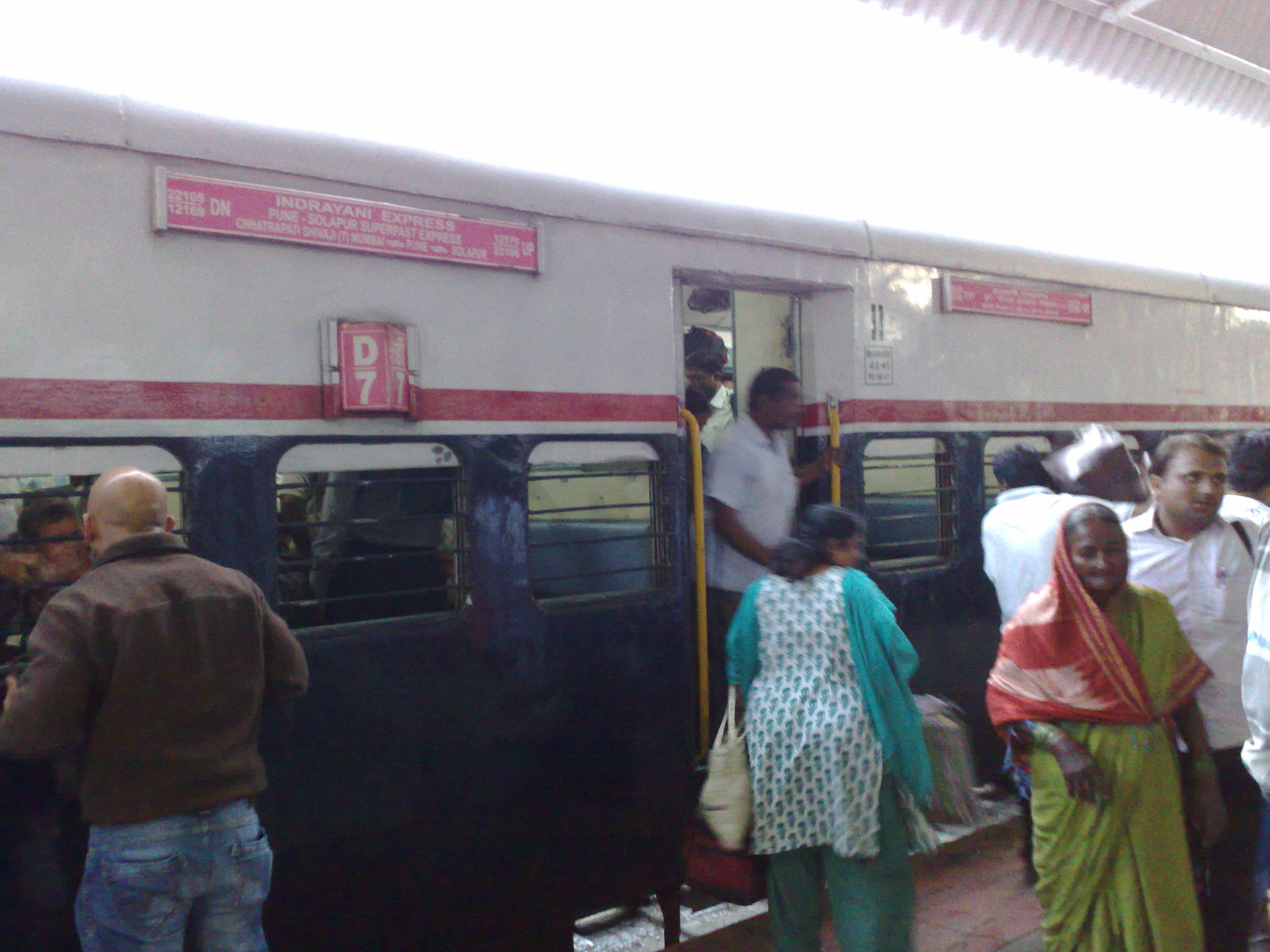
22106 Indrayani Express - 2nd Class seating

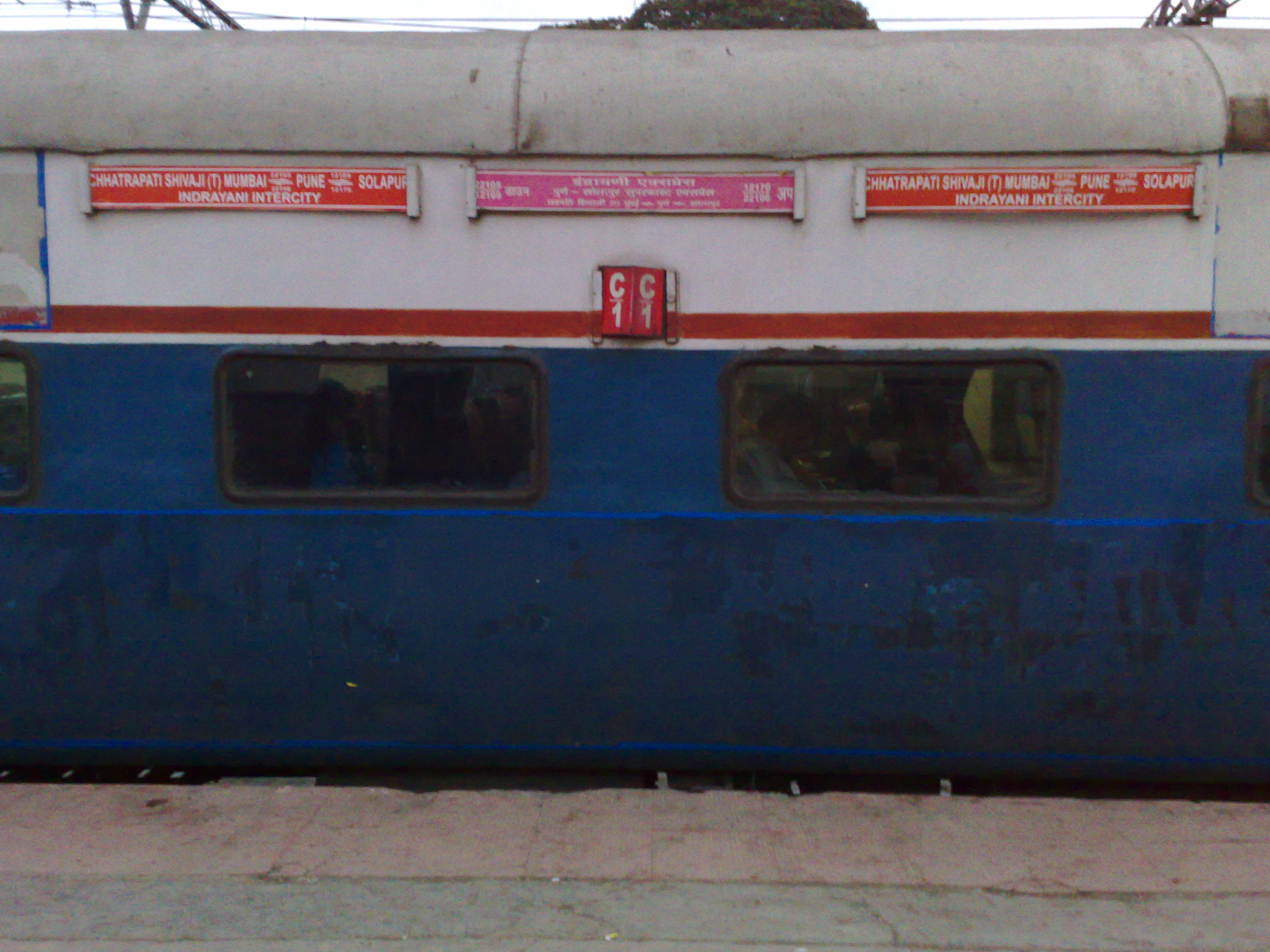
22106 Indrayani Express - AC Chair Coach

== Traction ==
Since March 2022, as the route is electrified, it is currently hauled by WAP-7 pure AC locomotive of the Kalyan shed. From November 2009 till March 2022, it was hauled by WDM-3A or WDP 4, to save time in locomotive change, due to the rake sharing with Pune Solapur Intercity Express, as the route after Daund Junction was not electrified.

When the train was introduced back in 1988, it was hauled by WCM 1/2/5 DC locomotives till the mid-1990s as the section between Mumbai CSMT and Pune was under 1500 V DC traction. From the mid-1990s, it was hauled by WCAM 2/2P or WCAM 3 dual traction locomotives of the Kalyan shed till November 2009, when the rake sharing was initiated.

At Karjat, it gets two or three WAG-5, WAG-7, WCAM-2 or WCAM 3 bankers of Kalyan shed to push the train on the ghat section between Karjat railway station and Lonavala railway station, where the gradient is of 1 in 37.

During the COVID-19 pandemic, all passenger trains of Indian Railways were suspended for operating from 24 March 2020 due to lockdown. Indrayani Express resumed its operations from 9 October 2020. However, this time train used to be hauled by WAP-7 Electric Locomotive since its rake sharing train Pune-Solapur Intercity Express was not permitted to resume operation.

== Time table ==
The Indrayani Express is the first of six dedicated trains to leave Mumbai CSMT for Pune Junction and is the last train to return.

22105 Indrayani Express leaves Mumbai CSMT every day at 05:40 hrs IST and reaches Pune Junction at 09:05 hrs IST.

On return, the 22106 Indrayani Express leaves Pune Junction every day at 18:35 hrs IST and reaches Mumbai CSMT at 21:55 hrs IST.

== Sister trains ==
- Dedicated Mumbai-Pune Intercity trains:

Via Kalyan	Via Panvel	Defunct
Deccan Express	Pragati Express	Pune Mail
Mumbai–Pune Intercity Express	Pragati Express	Mumbai–Pune Shatabdi Express
Deccan Queen	Pragati Express	Mumbai-Pune Passenger
Sinhagad Express	Pragati Express	Pune-Mumbai Passenger
	Pragati Express	Mumbai-Pune Janta Express
	Pragati Express	Bombay-Poona Express

== See also ==
- Pune-Solapur Intercity (Indrayani) Express (Rake sharing)
