= Pragati Express =

Train in India

Pragati Superfast Express
Overview
- Service type: Intercity Express
- Locale: Maharashtra
- First service: 27 December 1991; 34 years ago
- Current operator: Central Railway

Route
- Termini: Mumbai CSMT; Pune Junction
- Stops: 6
- Distance travelled: 187 km (116 mi)
- Average journey time: 3 hours 25 minutes
- Service frequency: Daily
- Train number: 12125 / 12126

On-board services
- Classes: AC Chair Car, Second Class Seating, General Unreserved and Vistadome
- Seating arrangements: Yes
- Sleeping arrangements: No
- Auto-rack arrangements: Overhead racks
- Catering facilities: No pantry car
- Observation facilities: Large windows
- Baggage facilities: No
- Other facilities: Below the seats

Technical
- Rolling stock: LHB coach
- Track gauge: 1,676 mm (5 ft 6 in)
- Operating speed: 110 km/h (68 mph) maximum, 54 km/h (34 mph) average including halts.

The 12125 / 12126 Pragati Superfast Express is a daily intercity express train plying between Pune and Mumbai via Panvel. It is operated by the Central Railways, a zonal railway under the larger Indian Railways. Currently, it plies the distance of 187 km in 3 hours and 25 minutes.

== Coaches ==
Pragati Express is composed of 15 LHB Coaches, as follows:

- 1 AC Chair Car
- 1 AC Vistadome
- 6 Second Seating
- 1 Unreserved coach (Reserved for Monthly Season Ticket holders)
- 4 General Second Class
- 1 Unreserved Ladies, Divyangjan and Brake Van
- 1 Generator Luggage and Brake Van

Pragati Express service is run using a single LHB rake and is maintained after every round trip in Pune at the Ghorpadi coaching depot

== Service ==
It was inaugurated on 27 December 1991 as an alternative to the most popular train on this sector the Deccan Queen. It is one of the six point-to-point express trains meant for intercity travel between Mumbai and Pune that carry thousands of regular commuters. The other five being the Sinhagad Express, Deccan Queen, Deccan Express, Indrayani Express and the Intercity Express. Although all trains have the same livery, the Pragati Express takes a different route. It takes the single line electrified route between Karjat and Panvel and continues towards Diva Junction from where it continues the rest of journey towards Mumbai CSMT. Thus it completely bypasses the Karjat–Kalyan Junction–Diva Junction section of the Central Line.

== Timing ==
The Pune–Mumbai Pragati Express Express is the 3rd of 6 dedicated trains to leave Pune Junction for Mumbai CST & is the 2nd-last train to return.

12126 Pune–Mumbai Pragati Express leaves Pune Junction every day at 07:50 hrs IST and reaches Mumbai CST at 11:15 hrs IST.

On return, the 12125 Mumbai–Pune Pragati Express leaves Mumbai CST every day at 16:25 hrs IST and reaches Pune Junction at 19:50 hrs IST.

== Traction ==
When the train was introduced, it was hauled by WCM 2/3/5 DC locomotives as the route between Mumbai and Pune was under 1500 V DC. Post 2014, after conversion of DC to AC on Central Line, it has been hauled occasionally by Bhusawal-based WAP-4/WAM-4 or Ajni-based WAP-7. As of 18 April, 2025, due to an acute shortage of healthy electric locomotives in the Central Railway zone, this train is temporarily being hauled by a WDP-4D of the Pune loco shed, which were laying dormant until now. However, this train may be hauled by the regular electric locomotive link.

At Karjat, it gets two or three WAG-7 or WCAM-3 bankers of Kalyan shed to push the train on the ghat section between Karjat railway station and Lonavala railway station, where the gradient is 1 in 40.

== Gallery ==
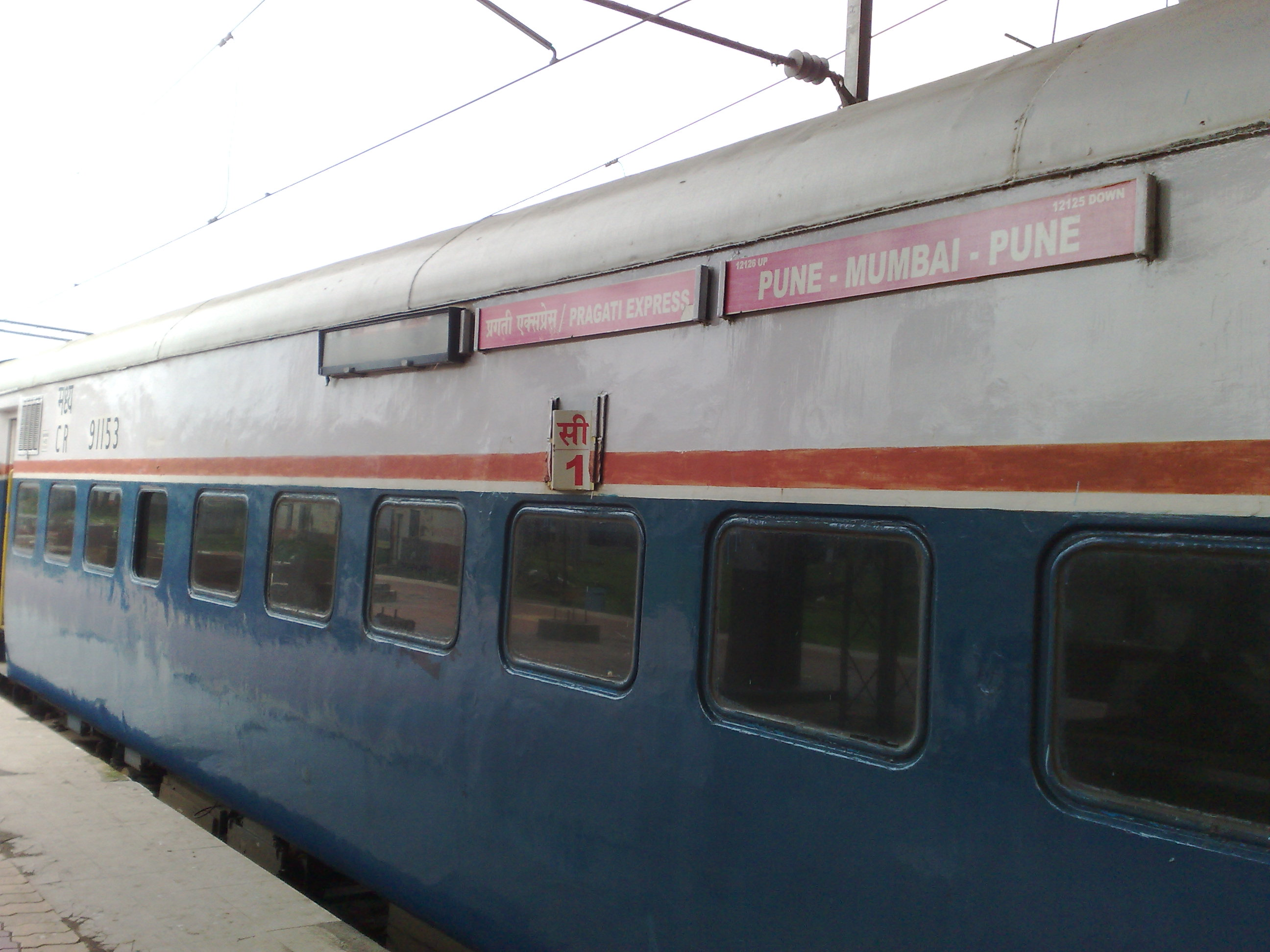
Old Pragati Express with beautiful coach

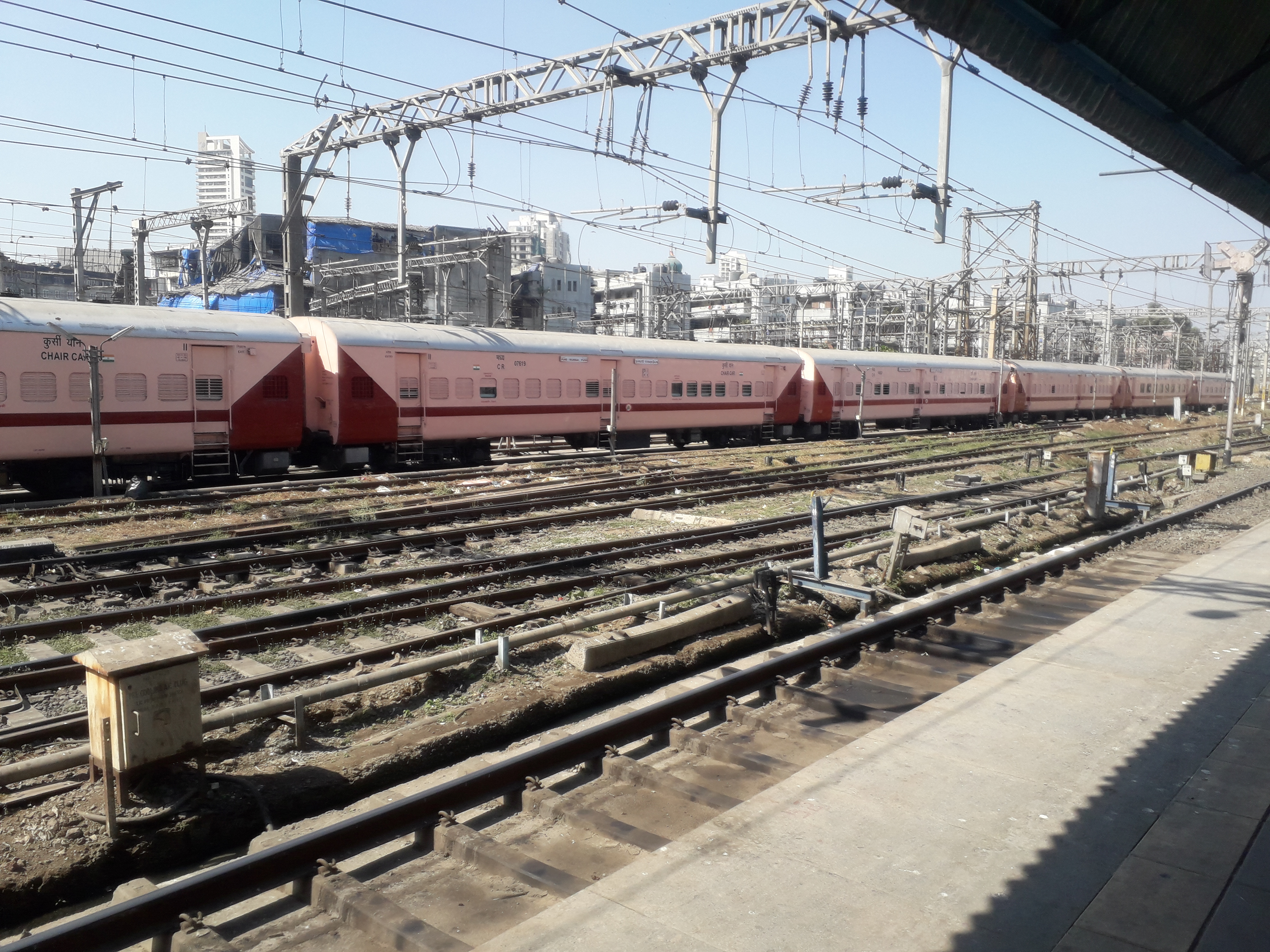
Pragati Express – with the new Uttamakristha coaches

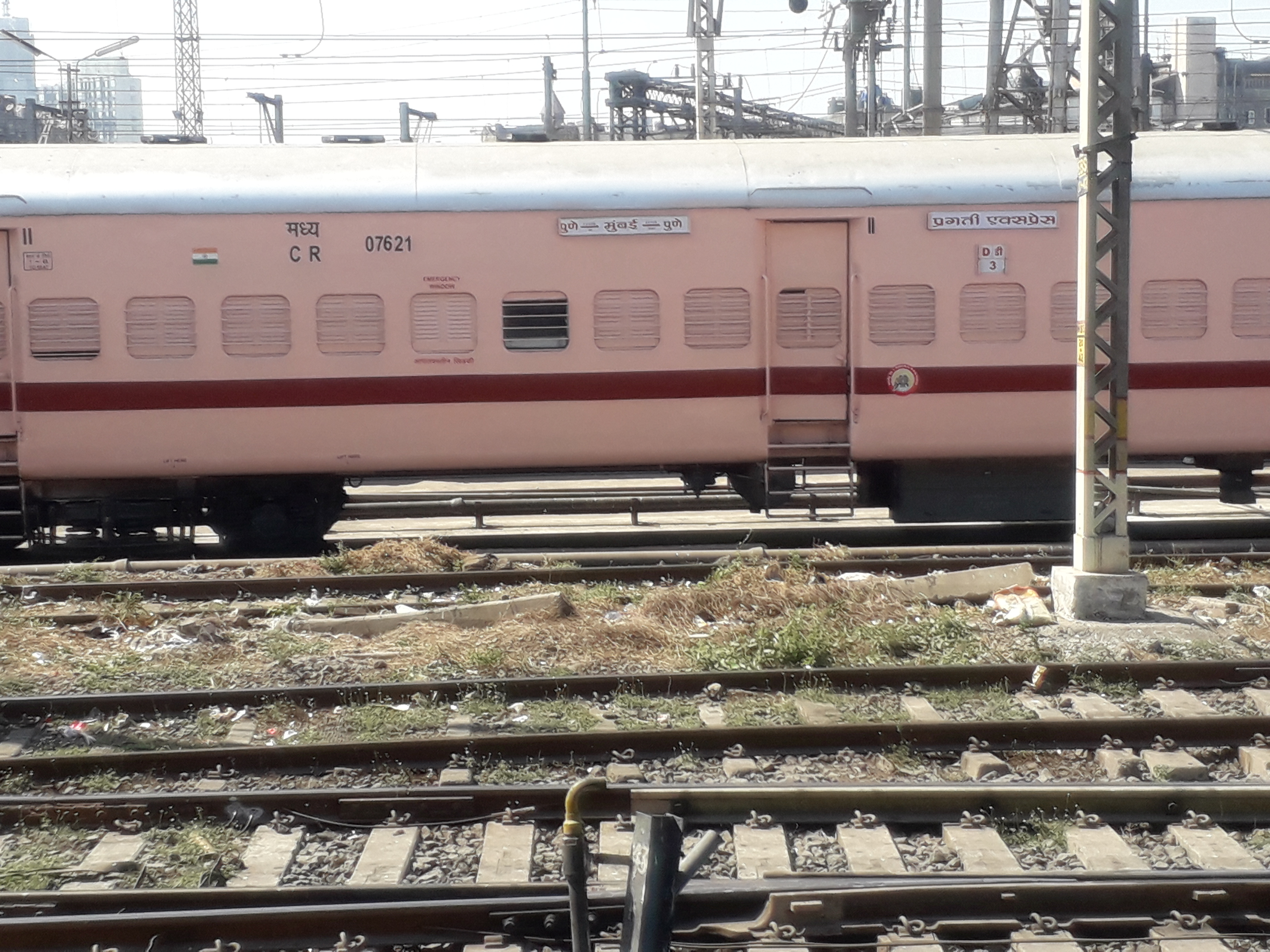
Pragati Express – 2nd Class seating – Uttamakristha coach

== Sister trains ==
- Dedicated Mumbai-Pune Intercity trains:

Via Kalyan	Defunct
Deccan Express	Mumbai–Pune Mail
Deccan Queen	Mumbai-Pune Passenger
Indrayani Express	Mumbai–Pune Shatabdi Express
Mumbai–Pune Intercity Express	Bombay-Poona Express
Sinhagad Express	Mumbai-Pune Janta Express
	Pune-Mumbai Passenger

== See also ==
- Mumbai–Pune Passenger
