= Deccan Express =

Train in India

Chhatrapati Shivaji Maharaj Terminus (Mumbai CSMT) - Pune Junction Deccan Express
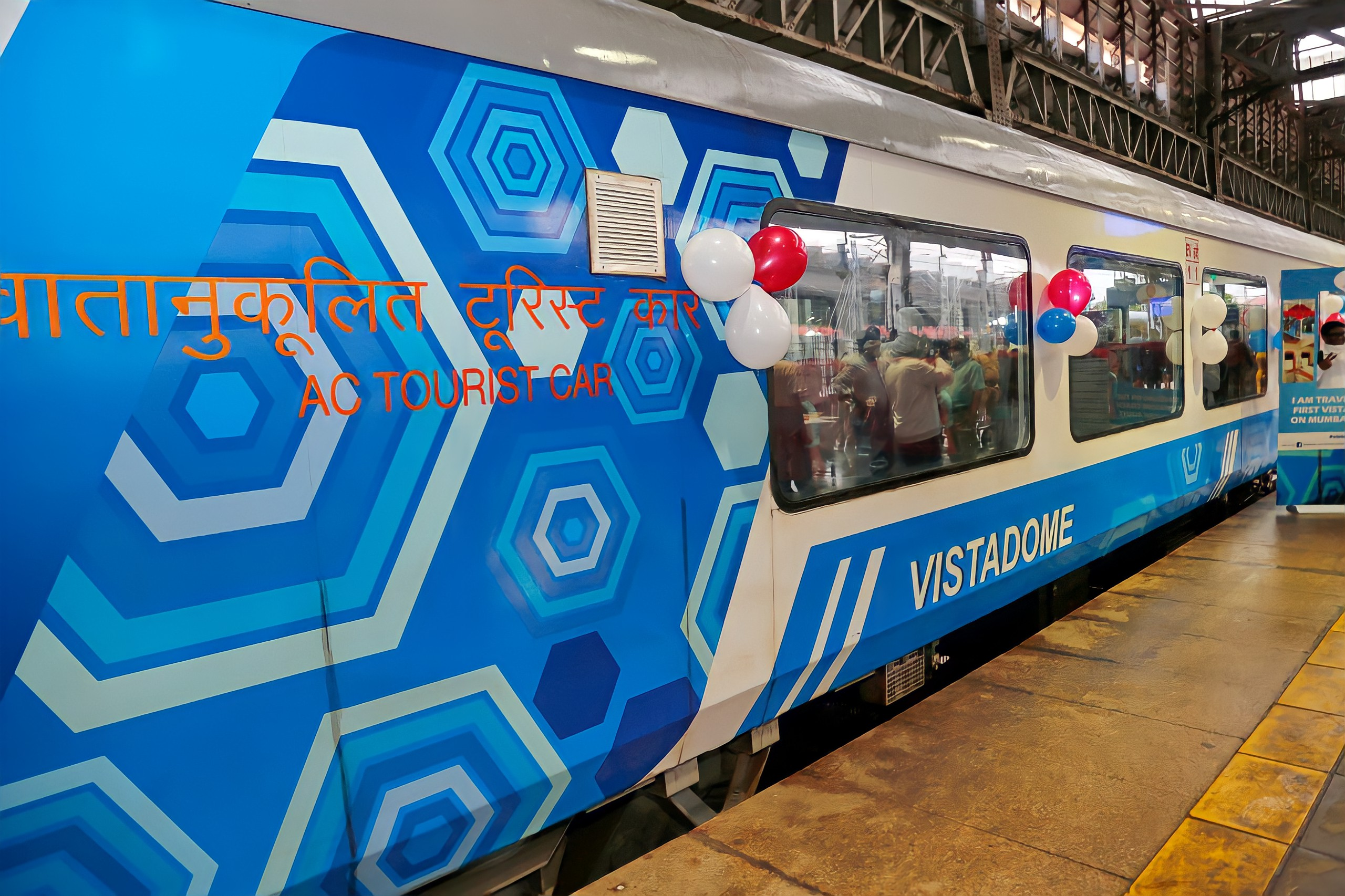
- Deccan Express with Vistadome Coach

Overview
- Service type: Mail/Express
- Locale: Maharashtra
- Current operator: Central Railways

Route
- Termini: Mumbai CSMT; Pune Junction
- Stops: 12 as 11007 Deccan Express, 11 as 11008 Deccan Express
- Distance travelled: 192 km (119 mi)
- Average journey time: 4 hours 5 minutes
- Service frequency: Daily
- Train number: 11007 / 11008

On-board services
- Classes: AC Chair Car, Second Class sitting, Vistadome
- Seating arrangements: Yes
- Sleeping arrangements: No
- Catering facilities: No pantry car
- Other facilities: Rake Sharing with 12051/52 Dadar-Magdaon Jan Shatabdi Express

Technical
- Rolling stock: LHB rake, Vistadome Coach
- Track gauge: 1,676 mm (5 ft 6 in)
- Operating speed: 100 km/h (62 mph) maximum 46 km/h (29 mph), including halts
Route map
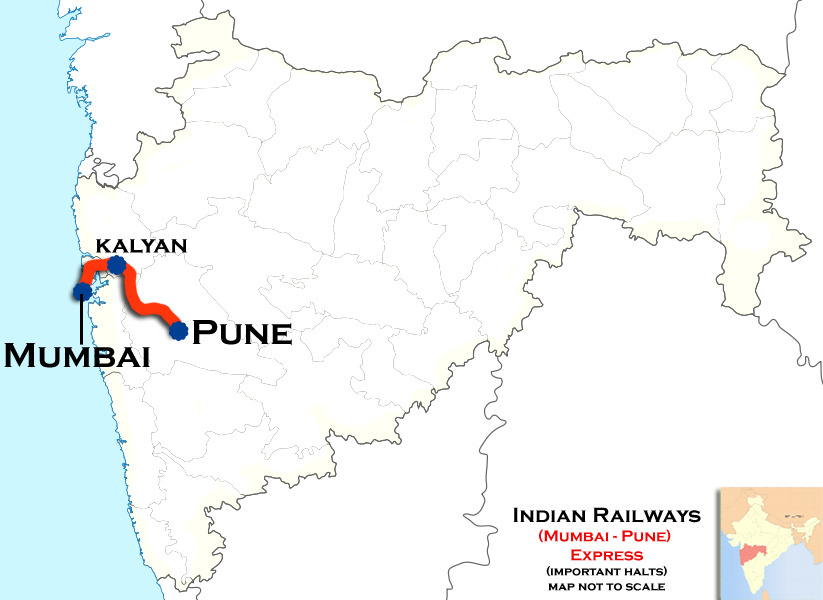

The Deccan Express is a daily express train connecting Mumbai and Pune, covering a distance of 192 km (119 mi). Train 11007 departs from Mumbai CSMT at 7:00 am and arrives at Pune Junction at 11:05 am, while train 11008 departs from Pune Junction at 3:27 pm and reaches Mumbai CSMT at 7:15 pm.

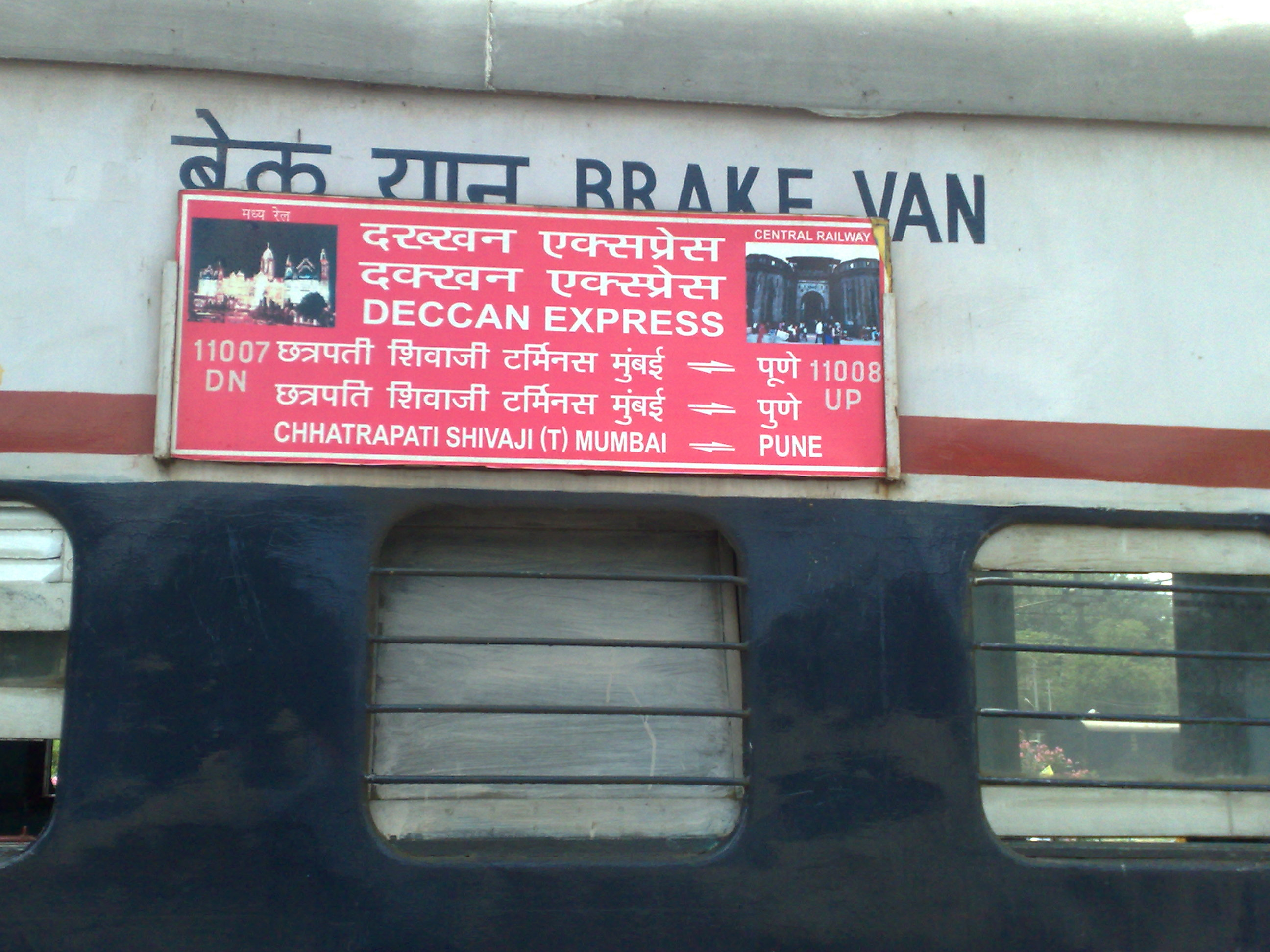
11008 Deccan Express

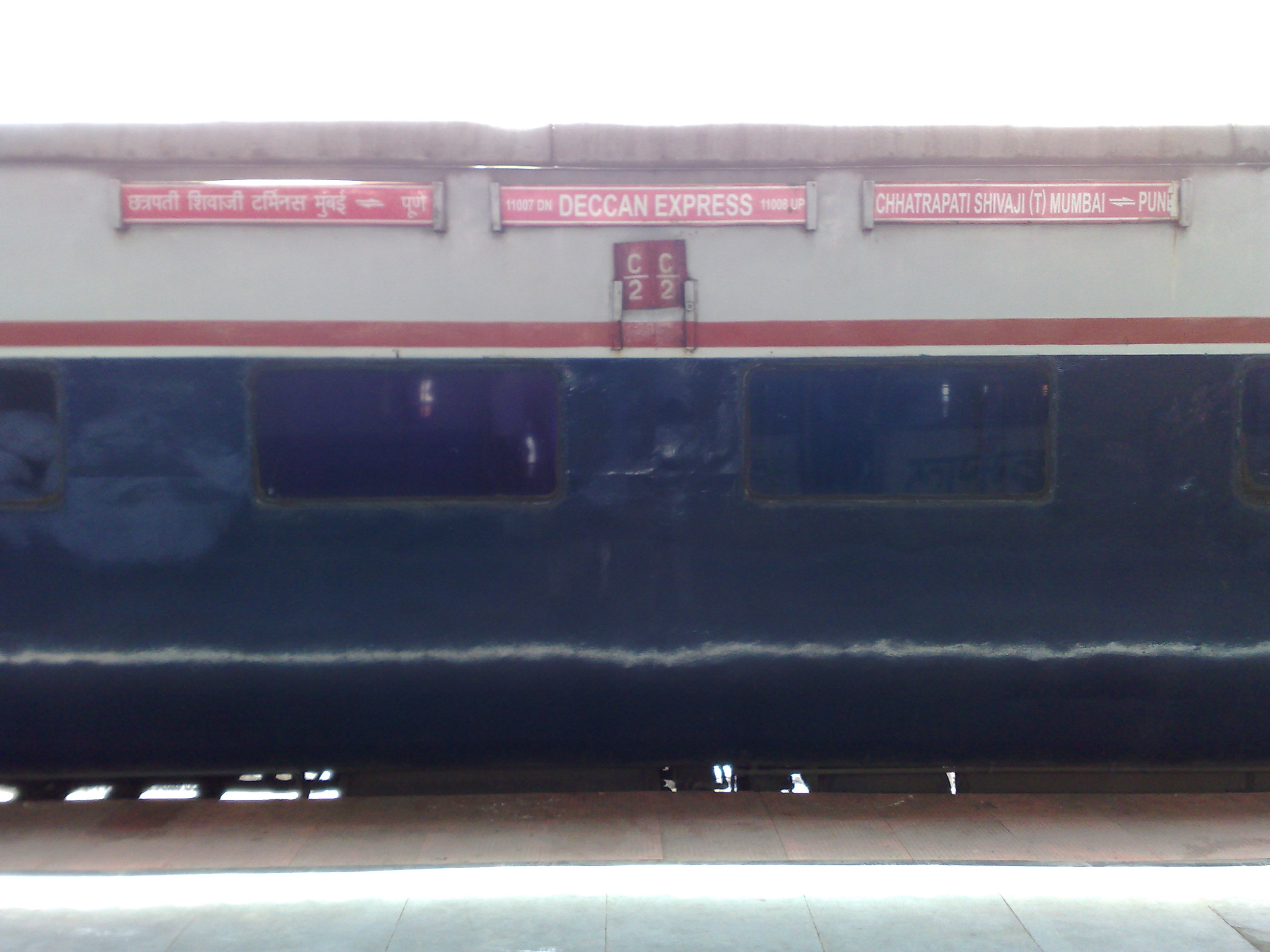
11008 Deccan Express – AC Chair Car Coach

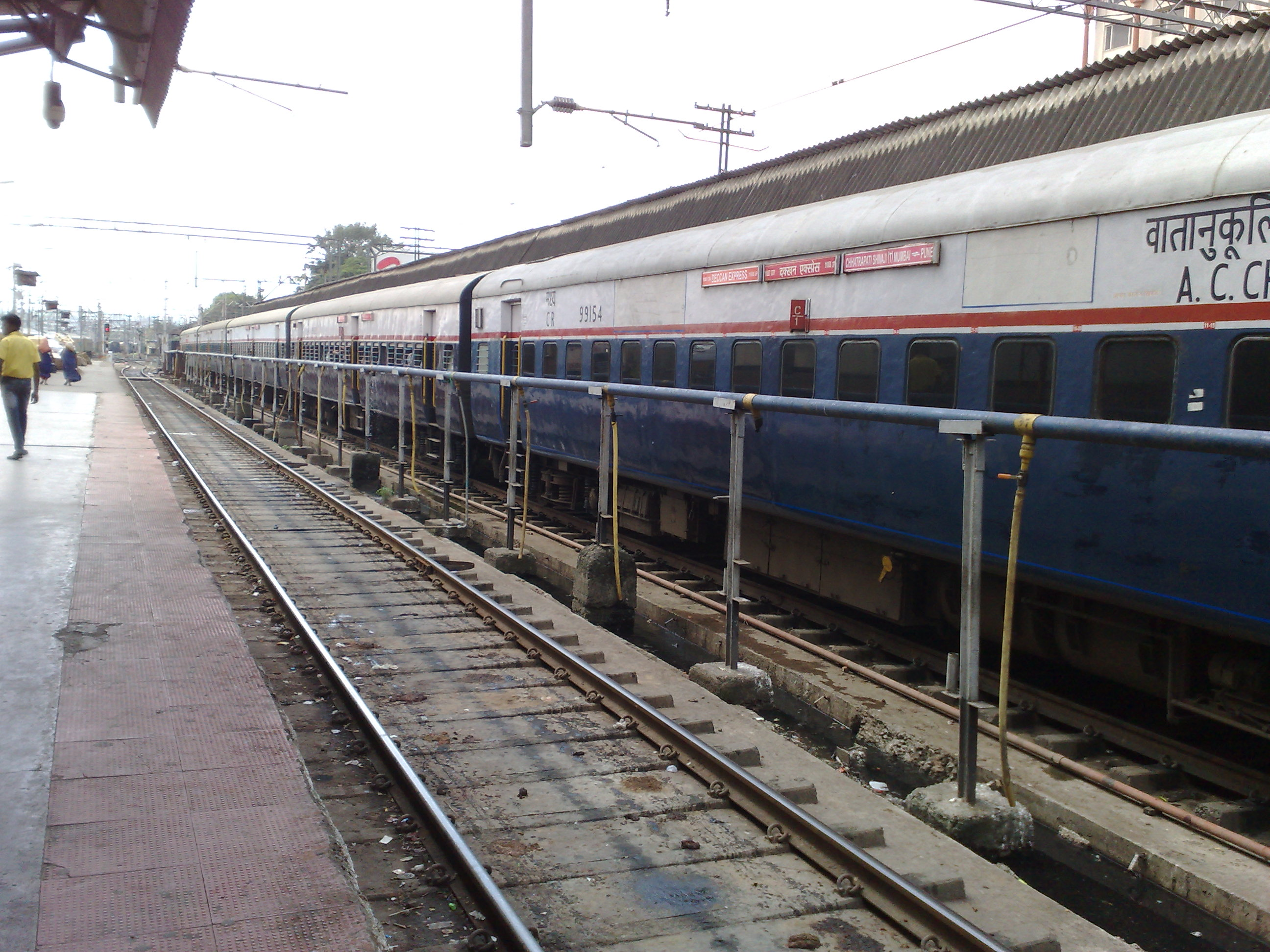
11008 Deccan Express at Pune Junction

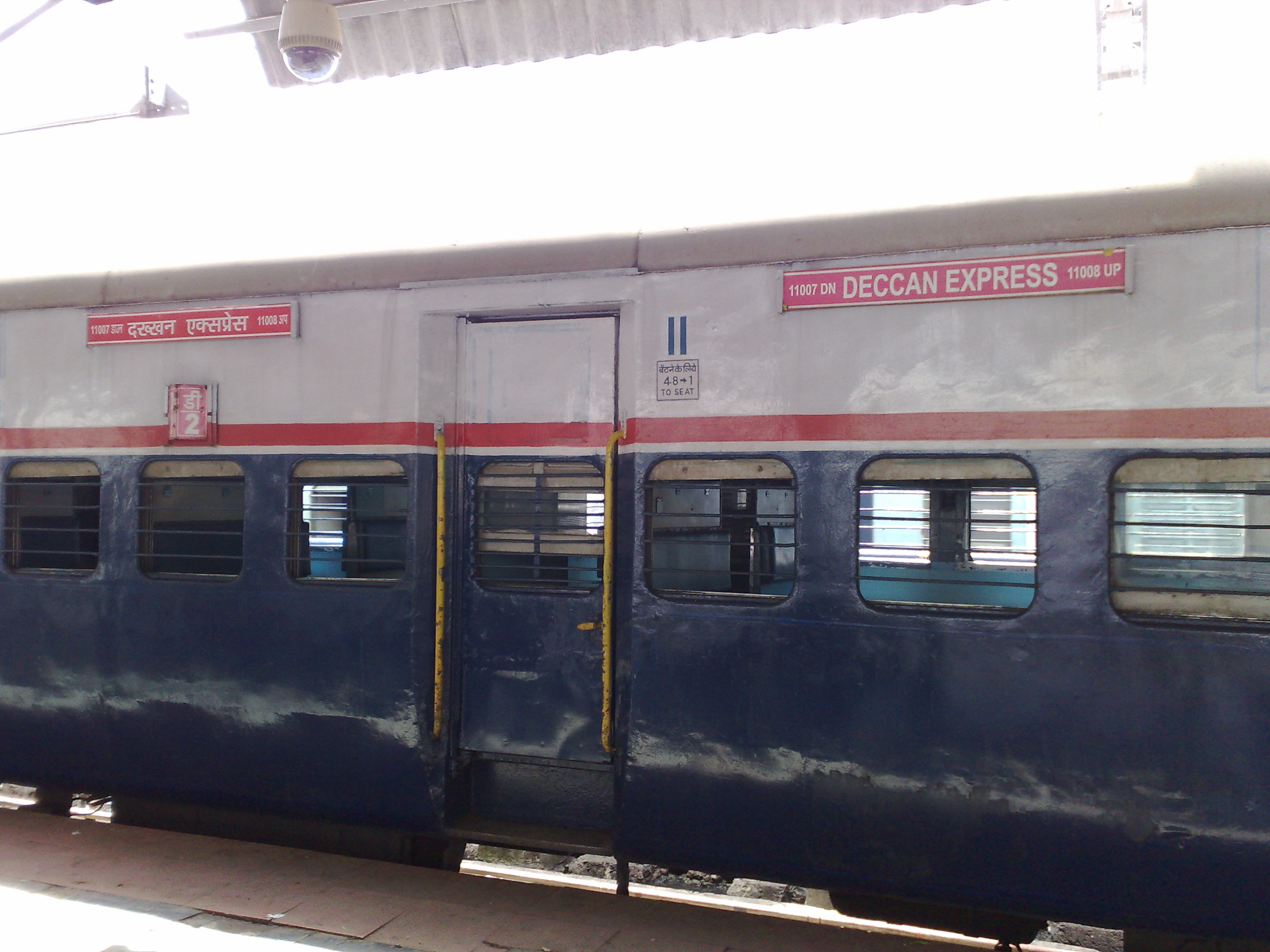
11008 Deccan Express – 2nd Class seating coach

== Services ==
The Deccan Express is a daily express train connecting Mumbai Chhatrapati Shivaji Maharaj Terminus (CSMT) and Pune Junction. It is operated by Indian Railways under the Central Railway zone. The train is named after the Deccan Plateau, the large plateau region covering much of peninsular India.

== Traction ==
The Deccan Express was previously hauled by WCAM-3 electric locomotives. From 18 April 2025, due to a shortage of operational electric locomotives in Central Railway, the train was temporarily switched to diesel haulage. Diesel locomotives were deployed as a temporary alternative while the railway faced a shortage of suitable electric locomotives.

== Timetable ==
The 11007 Deccan Express leaves Mumbai CSMT daily at 07:00 hrs and arrives at Pune Junction at 11:05 hrs. On its return journey, the 11008 Deccan Express leaves Pune Junction daily at 15:27 hrs and reaches Mumbai CSMT at 19:15 hrs.

Station code	Station name	11007			11008		
Station code	Station name	Arrival	Departure	Distance in km	Arrival	Departure	Distance in km
CSMT	Mumbai CSMT	Source	07:00	0	19:17	Destination	192
DR	Dadar	07:11	07:13	9	18:53	18:55	183
TNA	Thane	07:33	07:35	33	18:28	18:30	159
KYN	Kalyan Junction	07:53	07:55	53	18:02	18:05	139
NRL	Neral Junction	08:25	08:27	86	-	-	-
KJT	Karjat	08:43	08:45	100	17:18	17:20	92
KAD	Khandala	09:28	09:30	125	16:39	16:40	67
LNL	Lonavala	09:38	09:40	129	16:28	16:30	63
TGN	Talegaon	10:08	10:10	158	16:08	16:10	34
KK	Khadki	10:44	10:46	186	15:55	15:57	6
SVJR	Shivaji Nagar	10:49	10:51	190	15:28	15:30	2
PUNE	Pune Junction	11:05	Destination	192	Source	15:15	0

== History ==
Before the introduction of the Deccan Queen in 1930, the Poona Mail was an established and prestigious service connecting Bombay and Poona. It was operated by the Great Indian Peninsula Railway (GIPR), which later became part of Central Railway on 5 November 1951. The Poona Mail took approximately six hours to complete the Mumbai–Pune journey, while the newly introduced Deccan Queen reduced the journey time to around 2 hours and 45 minutes.

The Deccan Express was also operating on the Bombay–Poona route by the late 1950s. The Maharashtra State Gazetteer lists it separately alongside the Poona Mail and Deccan Queen among the through trains operating on the route.

During the 1980s, one or two non-AC double-decker coaches were occasionally attached to the Deccan Express. These coaches were also used on other trains operating between Mumbai and Pune, including the Sinhagad Express and Sahyadri Express.

On 26 June 2021, the Deccan Express resumed services as a special train with a Vistadome coach, marking the first introduction of a Vistadome coach on the Mumbai–Pune railway route. The train also operated with LHB coaches.

== Sister trains ==
- Dedicated Mumbai-Pune Intercity trains:

Via Kalyan	Via Panvel	Defunct
Deccan Queen	Pragati Express	Pune Mail
Mumbai–Pune Intercity Express	Pragati Express	Mumbai–Pune Shatabdi Express
Indrayani Express	Pragati Express	Mumbai-Pune Passenger
Sinhagad Express	Pragati Express	Pune-Mumbai Passenger
	Pragati Express	Mumbai-Pune Janta Express
	Pragati Express	Bombay-Poona Express

== See also ==
- Mumbai CSMT-Madgaon Jan Shatabdi Express (Rake sharing with this train)
