= Mumbai–Pune Passenger =

Mumbai – Pune passenger was a daily slow passenger train connecting the cities of Mumbai and Pune. This train originated from Chhatrapati Shivaji Maharaj Terminus and terminated at Pune Junction. This train used to travel via Kalyan and used to stop at all stations on the route. However this was shut down due to inconvenience by Central Railway because this created congestion to Mumbai CST–Pandharpur Fast Passenger, Mumbai CST–Bijapur Fast Passenger and Mumbai CST–Sainagar Shirdi Fast Passenger. It used to operate as 1325 from Mumbai to Pune and 1326 from Pune to Mumbai. It used to leave Mumbai at 22:50 and leave Pune at 23:40.

== See also ==
- Mumbai CST–Sainagar Shirdi Fast Passenger
- Mumbai CST–Pandharpur Fast Passenger
- Via Kalyan
1. Deccan Express
2. Deccan Queen
3. Indrayani Express
4. Intercity Express
5. Sinhagad Express
- Via Panvel
1. Pragati Express
- Defunct
1. Pune Mail
2. Mumbai–Pune Shatabdi Express
3. Mumbai-Pune Janta Express
4. Pune-Mumbai Passenger
5. Mumbai-Pune Express
