= Mumbai–Pune Mail =

Luxurious train in India

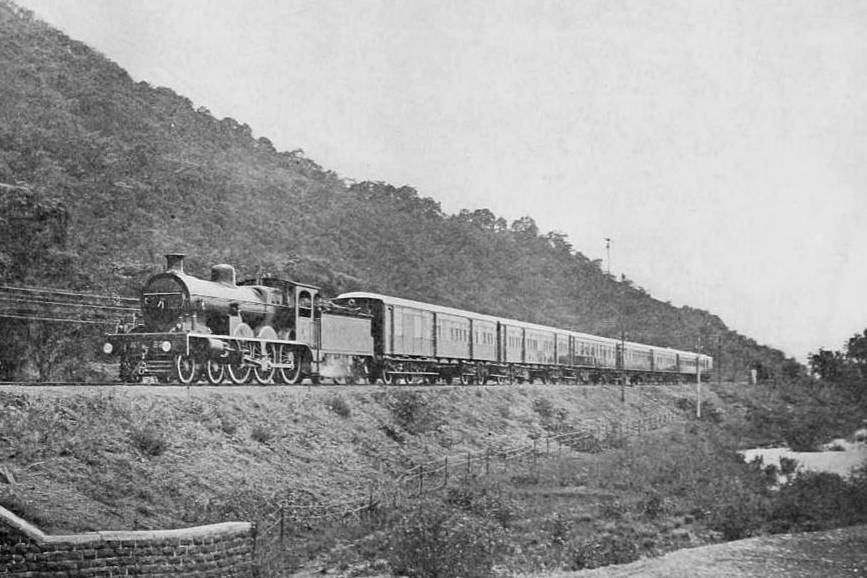
- Poona Mail (ca. 1907)

Overview
- Service type: Mail Train
- Locale: till 1950: Bombay Presidency, British India/India; from 1950 - 30 April 1960: Bombay State, India; from 1 May 1960: Maharashtra, India
- First service: 21 April 1863
- Current operators: Great Indian Peninsula Railway (21 April 1963 - 5 November 1951); Central Railway (5 November 1951 - 1971 (Extended till Miraj))

Route
- Termini: Chhatrapati Shivaji Maharaj Terminus, Mumbai; Pune Junction railway station
- Distance travelled: 192.2 km (119.4 mi)
- Average journey time: 4 hours, 15 minutes
- Service frequency: Daily
- Train number: 303

On-board services
- Classes: First Class, Second Class and Intermediate Class
- Seating arrangements: Yes
- Sleeping arrangements: No

Technical
- Track gauge: 1,676 mm (5 ft 6 in)
- Operating speed: 45.81 km/h (28 mph) with stops
Route map
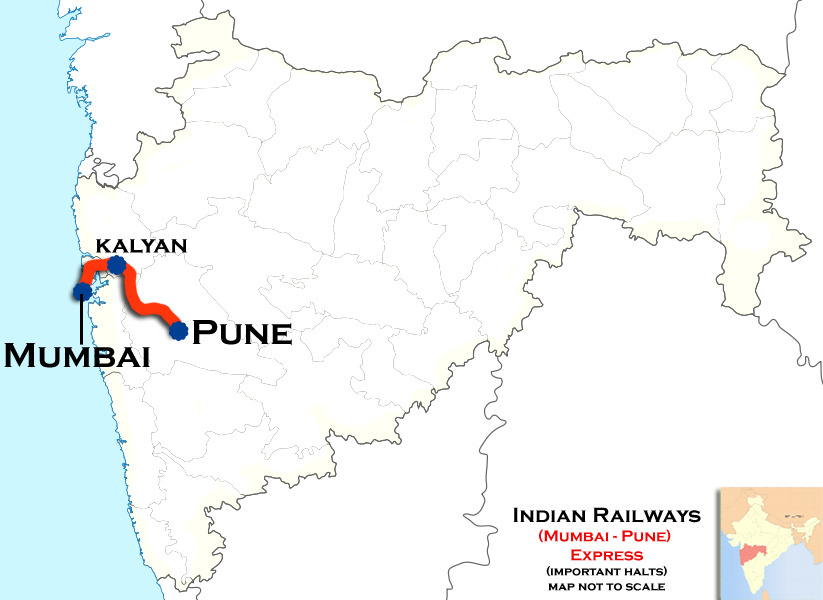

Mumbai–Pune Mail (started as Bombay–Poona Mail) or Poona Mail was a luxurious train on Mumbai–Pune section by the Great Indian Peninsula Railway. It was the first intercity train started between Mumbai and Pune. This train and the famous Deccan Queen Express used to serve Mumbai Pune commuters for many years. Started as Mail in 1863, it was 303 Poona Mail in 1964. Got extension to Miraj past GC as 303 Bombay Mail in 1971 & become 303 Mahalaxmi Express during 1974 with final extension to Kolhapur. During Poona–Bangalore MG era, this connects 902 MG Poona Mail (Poona–Bangalore till 1971), 304 MG Bombay Mail (Miraj–Bangalore 1971–1974) & 304 MG Mahalaxmi Express (Miraj–Bangalore 1974 onwards till Miraj–Bangalore GC) by Section Carriage Interchanged at Poona & later at Miraj.

== Timetable ==
It used to leave Pune at 7 am and Lonavala at 8:15 am and reach Mumbai by 11:10 am. The return train used to leave Mumbai at 2:45 pm and Lonavala at 5:55 pm and reach Pune by 7 pm. Later the departure time was changed to 5:55 pm from Mumbai.

Poona Mail (Time Table 1944)
| 4 UP | Stations | 3 DN |
|---|---|---|
| Departure | Stations | Departure |
| 10:45 (Arrival) | Bombay Victoria Terminus | 17:20 |
| 10:30 | Byculla | 17:26 |
| 10:19 | Dadar | 17:34 |
| 09:48 | Kalyan | 18:13 |
| 09:14 | Neral | Skip |
| Skip | Karjat | 18:58 |
| 08:26 | Khandala | 19:32 |
| 08:16 | Lonavala | 19:46 |
| 07:23 | Kirkee | 20:35 |
| Skip | Shivajinagar | 20:44 |
| 07:15 | Poona Junction | 20:55 (Arrival) |

- Note: Skip = train does not stop

== Coaches and operation, 1907 ==
=== Coaches ===
In the year 1907 the train was operated with seven coaches with a total weight of 240 t. Seats for 50 first, 95 second and 320 third class passengers were provided. The restaurant car had another 32 seats. The train crew of 8 man included guard, conductor, car attendant, refreshment manager and waiters. The livery of the train was dark red-brown on the lower part and cream for the upper part.

Each car was 62 ft (19 m) long and 10 ft (3 m) wide. The chairs could be turned around in order that the passengers were always looking in the travel direction. The cars had electric lighting powered by axle driven generators. 3rd class passengers did not have reserved seats. Punkah fans were provided only in 1st and 2nd class. The cars were fitted with vacuum brake and passenger alarm signal.

=== Train composition ===
The train was composed in the following way:

- Locomotive
- Combination car with baggage compartment, guard compartment, 3rd class seating with compartments for Indian women and 3rd class refreshment bar
- 3rd class chair car
- 2nd class car with chair seating as well as two compartments and a cloakroom
- Composite car containing 1st and 2nd chair class and 1st class compartments
- Dining car
- 1st class parlor car with smoking room and ladies's boudoir
- Combination car with baggage, post office and guard facilities and 3rd class chair compartment for Europeans.

=== Traction ===
The train was pulled by a 4-6-0 steam engine from Mumbai to the beginning of the 1:37-inclined Bhor Ghat mountain pass. At Karjat, the power was changed to two 0-4-0T engines, which brought the train up the Ghat. At Lonavala, the power was changed again to one single 4-coupled engine for the rest of the 40 mi (64 km) long journey to Pune.

== See also ==
- Sister trains Mumbai–Pune:
- Via Kalyan
1. Deccan Express
2. Deccan Queen
3. Indrayani Express
4. Mumbai–Pune Intercity Express
5. Sinhagad Express
- Via Panvel
1. Pragati Express
- Defunct
1. Mumbai–Pune Shatabdi Express
2. Mumbai–Pune Passenger
3. Pune-Mumbai Passenger
4. Bombay-Poona Express
5. Mumbai-Pune Janta Express
- Mahalaxmi Express (successor train)
