= Mumbai–Pune Intercity Express =

Indian Railways express train

Mumbai Chhatrapati Shivaji Maharaj Terminus - Pune Junction Intercity Superfast Express
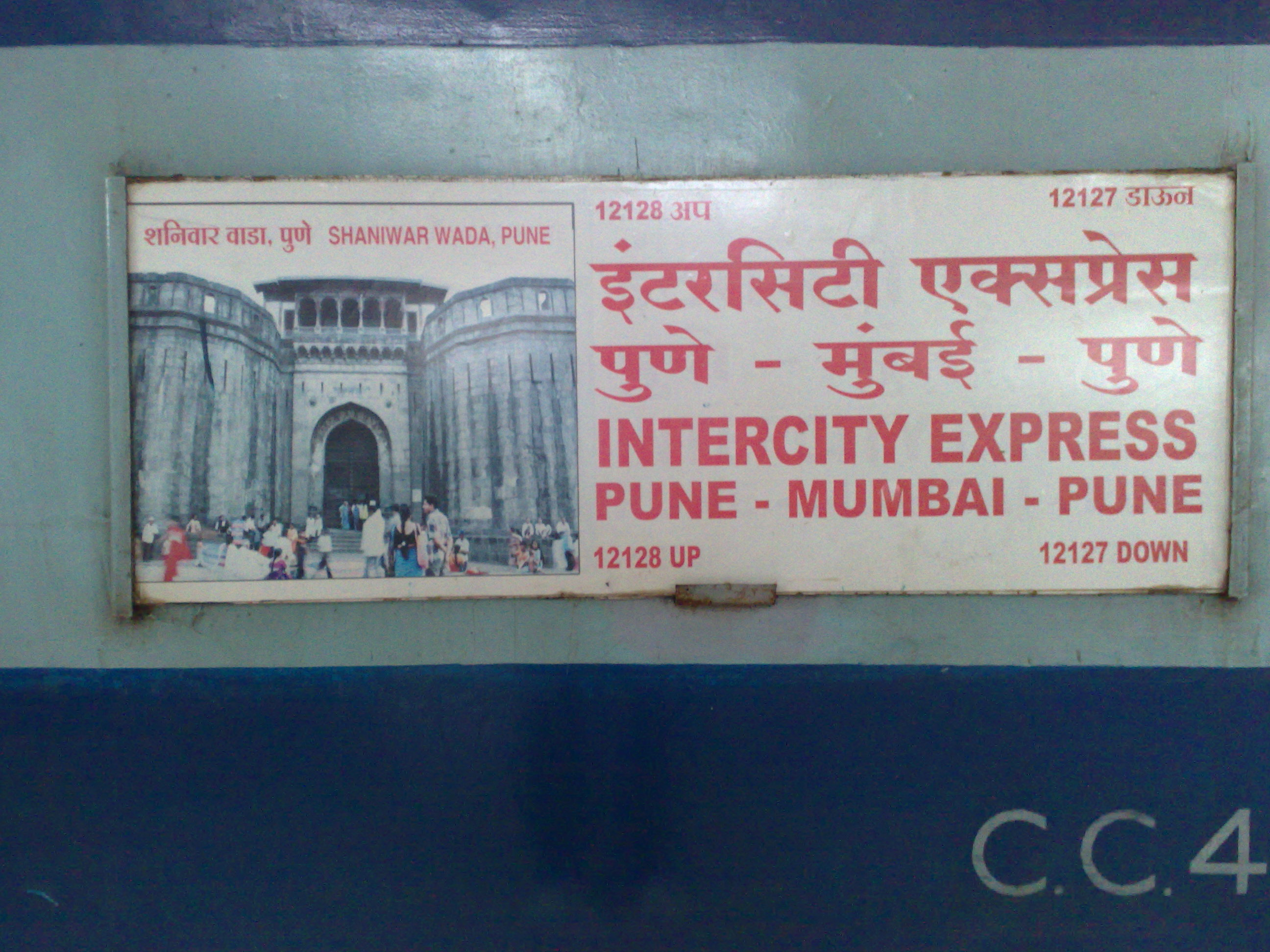

Overview
- Service type: Superfast Express
- Locale: Maharashtra
- First service: 15 March 2004
- Current operator: Central Railways

Route
- Termini: Chhatrapati Shivaji Maharaj Terminus; Pune Junction
- Stops: 3 as 12127 Mumbai-Pune Intercity Express; 3 as 12128 Pune-Mumbai Intercity Express (+1 technical)
- Distance travelled: 192 km (119 mi)
- Average journey time: 3 hours 17 minutes as 12127 Mumbai-Pune Intercity Express; 3 hours 10 minutes as 12128 Pune-Mumbai Intercity Express
- Service frequency: daily
- Train number: 12127 / 12128

On-board services
- Classes: AC Chair Car, Second Class sitting
- Seating arrangements: Yes
- Sleeping arrangements: No
- Auto-rack arrangements: No
- Catering facilities: yes, a paid Pantry Car
- Observation facilities: No Rake Sharing, Push Pull operation method was experimented with Ajni WAP-7, Replaced Shatabdi Express.
- Entertainment facilities: None

Technical
- Rolling stock: Ajni WAP 7, LHB Rake
- Track gauge: 1,676 mm (5 ft 6 in)
- Operating speed: 130 km/h (81 mph) maximum 74.32 km/h (46 mph), including halts

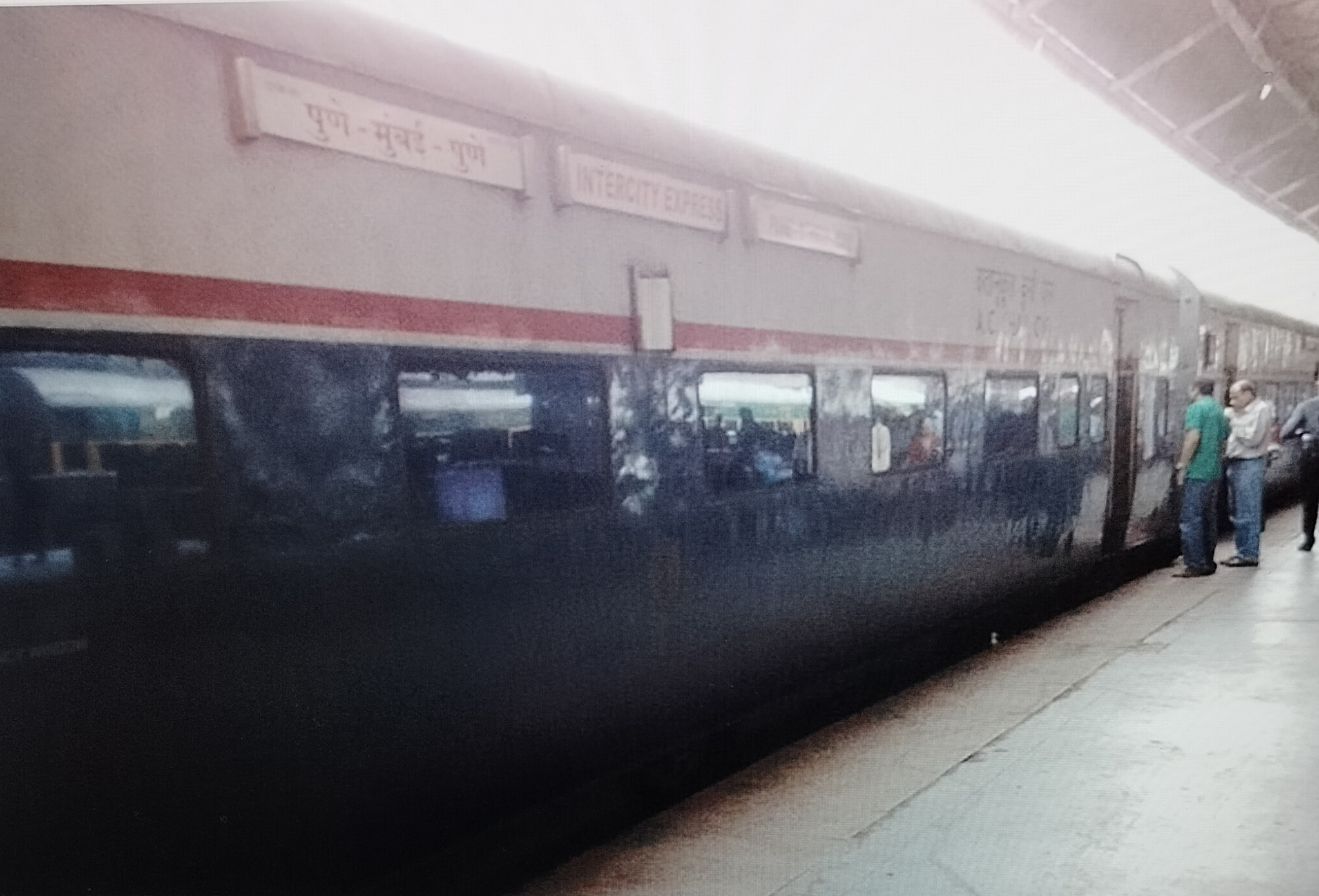
12128 Pune Mumbai Intercity Express at Pune Junction

The 12127/12128 Chhatrapati Shivaji Maharaj Terminus - Pune Junction Intercity Superfast Express is an Express train belonging to Indian Railways that runs between Mumbai CSMT and Pune Junction in India. It is a daily service. It operates as train number 12127 from Mumbai CSMT to Pune Junction and as train number 12128 in the reverse direction.

== History ==
The train was introduced in 2004 in place of Mumbai-Pune Shatabdi Express, a 10 coach air conditioned train that used to run with AC chair car and 2 End-On-Generation coaches. The Shatabdi Express ran almost empty despite being given a good priority on the route with fewer stops and more speed, due to high fares and increased demands for a "middle class friendly" train, and was thus discontinued.

== Coaches ==
The Mumbai Pune Intercity Express has 2 AC chair cars, 8 general second class, 4 general second class coaches unreserved, and 2 generator car coaches. Total = 16

As is customary with Indian Railways, coaches are added/removed as per the demand.

Starting 6 June 2018, Mumbai Pune Intercity Express has been allotted the modern and advanced LHB coach for safety and speed.

Now this train runs at a maximum speed of 130 km per hour between Khadki Pune route with an Ajni WAP 7 locomotive.

== Service ==
The Mumbai Pune Intercity Superfast Express was introduced on 15 March 2004 and is one of 6 dedicated intercity chair car trains between Mumbai CSMT and Pune Junction. The other 5 trains are 11007/08 Deccan Express, 11009/10 Sinhagad Express, 12125/26 Pragati Express, 12123/24 Deccan Queen & 22105/06 Indrayani Express.

It covers the distance of 192 kilometres in 2 hours 40 mins as 12127 Mumbai Pune Intercity Express (72 km/h) and 2 hours 35 mins as Pune Mumbai Intercity Express (74.32 km/h).

This train now operates by Push Pull technique and the technical halt at Karjat for attaching bankers is removed. Today Intercity departs Mumbai CSMT at 6:45 AM and arrives Pune Junction at 9:55 AM and the reverse trains leaves Pune Junction at 6:30 PM and arrives Mumbai CSMT at 9:05 PM. Thus the travelling time is reduced to 2 hr 35 min and the Intercity becomes the fastest train among the six sister trains between Mumbai and Pune. From December 2019 onward, the Push Pull Technique has been discontinued, as there was no improvement in the time saved (beyond 20 min) even after eliminating stop at Karjat Junction. Furthermore, though Karjat Junction was not a scheduled halt for the regular (single loco) train, people were able to "get in" and "get out" when the train halted for a connection of WAG 7 twin bankers. Therefore, there was a negative feedback from such region specific customers who wanted the train to stop at Karjat Junction. However this train was converted to normal mode by central railways from 21/11/2019. Now the train runs on its regular time table taking 3 hrs 10 min between Pune to Mumbai and 3 hrs 17 min between Mumbai to Pune.

== Traction ==
At its introduction, the Intercity Express has been hauled end to end by a KYN based WCAM 3 or WCAM 2 locomotive until present. It is the only train between Mumbai CSMT and Pune Junction never to have been hauled by a pure DC locomotive. Post 2014, after conversion of DC to AC on Central Line, it has been hauled occasionally by Bhusaval based WAP 4/WAM-4 or Ajni based WAP 7. However, the WCAM locos were mostly used to haul it both ways. As of 18 April 2025, due to an acute shortage of healthy electric locomotives in the Central Railway zone, this train is temporarily being hauled by a WDP-4D of the Pune loco shed, which were laying dormant until now.

At Karjat, it gets two or three WAG-5, WAG-7 or WCAM 3 bankers of Kalyan shed to push the train on the ghat section between Karjat railway station and Lonavala railway station, where the gradient is of 1 in 40. Now it is push pulled by an WAP-7, one in the front and the other at the rear, so the technical halt at Karujath is not required. The Push Pull Technology is used no more, as there was no significant time saving as proposed in the initial plan, see the paragraphs above for a detailed explanation.

== Timetable ==
The Mumbai Pune Intercity Superfast Express is the 2nd of 6 dedicated trains to leave Mumbai CSMT for Pune Junction and is the second-to-last train to return.

12127 Mumbai Pune Intercity Superfast Express leaves Mumbai CSMT every day at 06:45 hrs IST and reaches Pune Junction at 09:20 hrs IST.

On return, the 12128 Pune Mumbai Intercity Superfast Express leaves Pune Junction every day at 18:30 hrs IST and reaches Mumbai CSMT at 21:05 hrs IST.

== Sister train ==
- Dedicated Mumbai-Pune Intercity trains:

Via Kalyan	Via Panvel	Defunct
Deccan Express	Pragati Express	Poona Mail
Deccan Queen	Pragati Express	Mumbai-Pune Janta Express
Indrayani Express	Pragati Express	Mumbai-Pune Shatabdi Express
Sinhagad Express	Pragati Express	Mumbai-Pune Passenger
	Pragati Express	Bombay-Poona Express
	Pragati Express	Pune-Mumbai Passenger

== See also ==
- Mumbai–Pune Passenger
