= Sinhagad Express =

Intercity railway service in India

Pune - Chhatrapati Shivaji Maharaj Terminus (Mumbai CSMT) Sinhagad Express
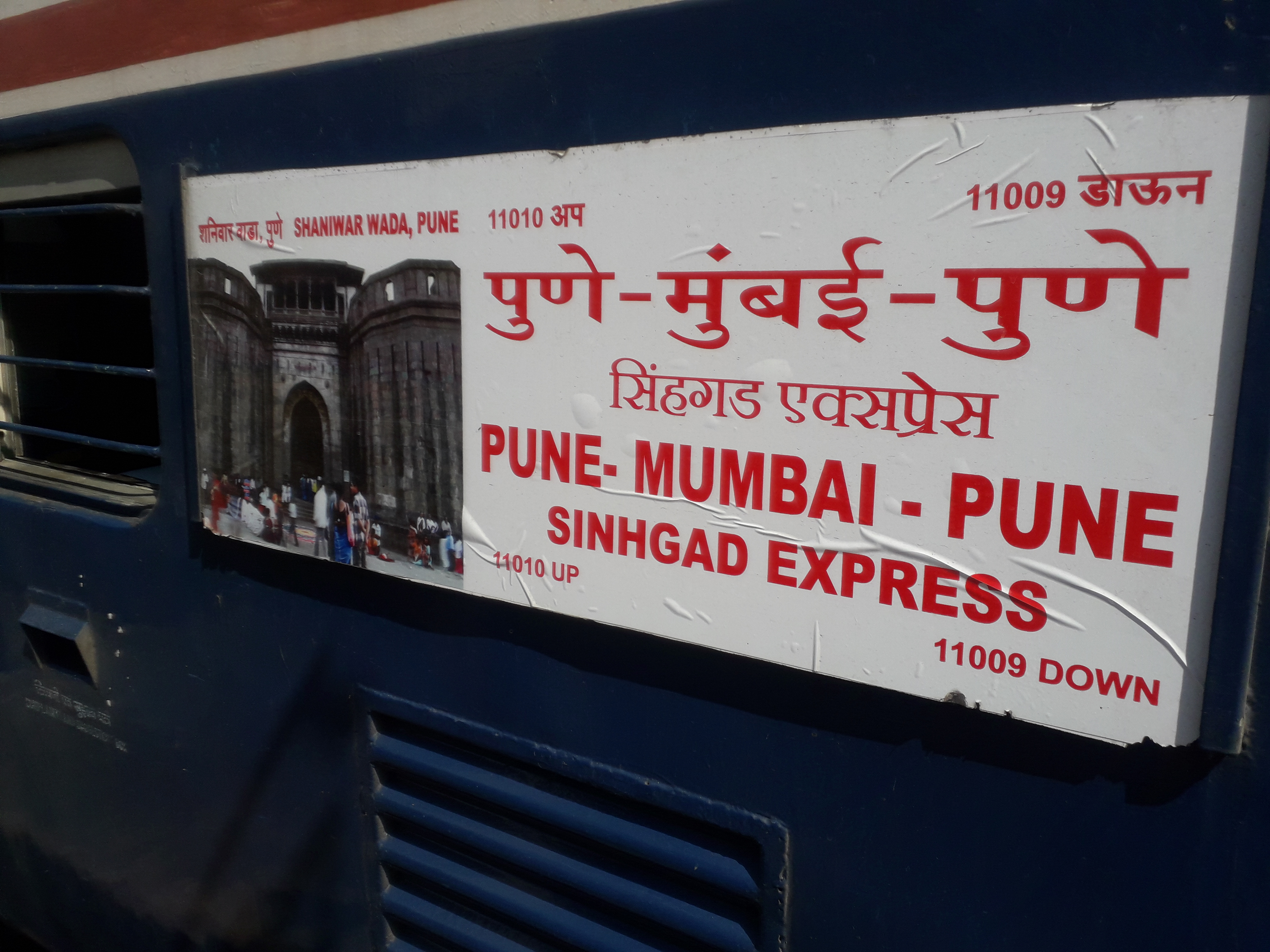

Overview
- Service type: Intercity Express
- Locale: Maharashtra
- First service: 12 April 1978; 48 years ago (as the first Double Decker Express in India)
- Current operator: Central Railway

Route
- Termini: Mumbai CSMT; Pune Junction
- Stops: 9 as 11010 Sinhagad Express, 10 as 11009 Sinhagad Express
- Distance travelled: 192 km (119 mi)
- Average journey time: 3 hours 50 minutes as 11010 Sinhagad Express, 4 hours as 11009 Sinhagad Express
- Service frequency: Daily
- Train number: 11009 / 11010

On-board services
- Classes: AC Chair Car, Second Class sitting
- Seating arrangements: Yes
- Sleeping arrangements: No
- Catering facilities: No Pantry coach

Technical
- Rolling stock: LHB rake
- Track gauge: 1,676 mm (5 ft 6 in)
- Operating speed: 110 km/h (68 mph) maximum 50 km/h (31 mph), including halts
Route map
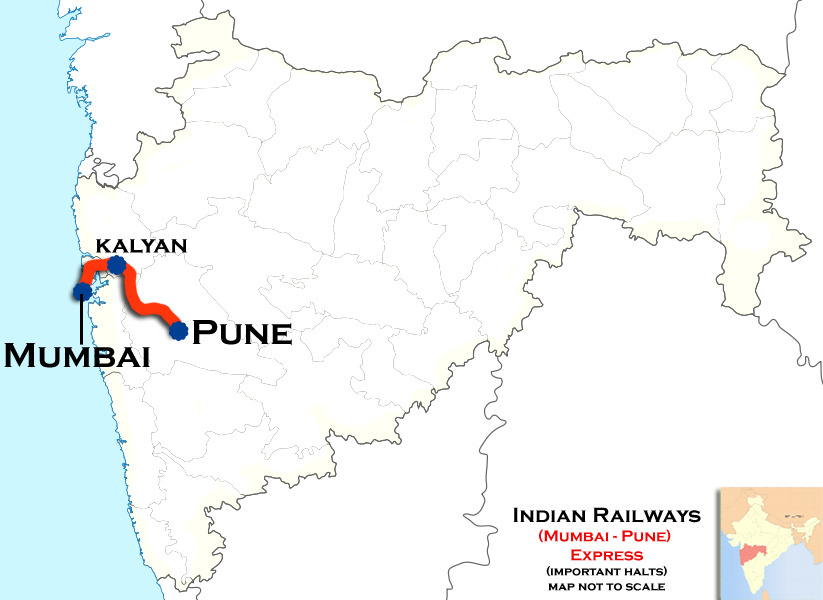

The Sinhagad Express is an Intercity Express train which plies daily between the cities of Pune and Mumbai in India. It is operated by the Indian Railways and comes under the Central Railway zone.

It is one of the six point-to-point express trains which carry thousands of passengers daily between Pune and Mumbai, the other five being Pragati Express, Deccan Queen, Deccan Express, Indrayani Express and Intercity Express. Sinhagad Express is named after the fort of Sinhagad which means a Lion's Fort located in Pune.

== Schedule ==
Sinhagad Express departs from Pune Junction at 06:05 am IST and reaches Chhatrapati Shivaji Maharaj Terminus, Mumbai at 09.55 am. It leaves Chhatrapati Shivaji Maharaj Terminus, Mumbai on the same day at 17:50 pm and reaches Pune Junction at 21:50 pm on the same day. It covers a distance of 192 km in one direction during its journey. Its train number is 11010 while travelling from Pune to Mumbai, whereas the train number is 11009 during the return journey from Mumbai to Pune.

== Routing ==
The 11010 / 09 Sinhagad Express runs from Pune Junction via Shivaji Nagar, Pimpri, Chinchwad, Lonavala, Karjat, Kalyan Junction, Thane, Dadar to Chhatrapati Shivaji Maharaj Terminus.

== Traction ==
As of 18 April 2025, due to an acute shortage of healthy electric locomotives in the Central Railway zone, this train is temporarily being hauled by a WDP-4D of the Pune loco shed, which were laying dormant until now.

== Gallery ==
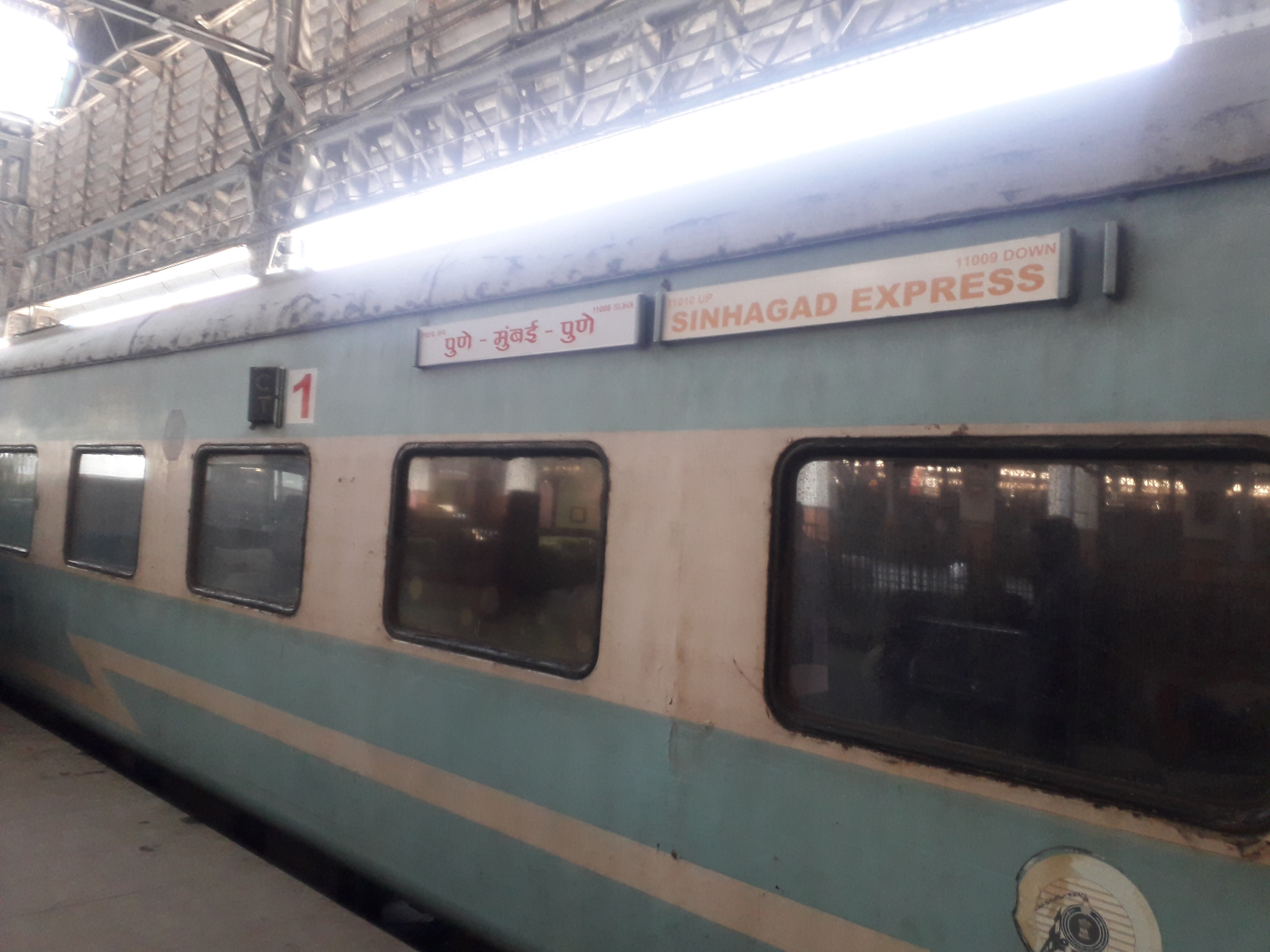
11009 Sinhagad Express – AC Chair Car coach

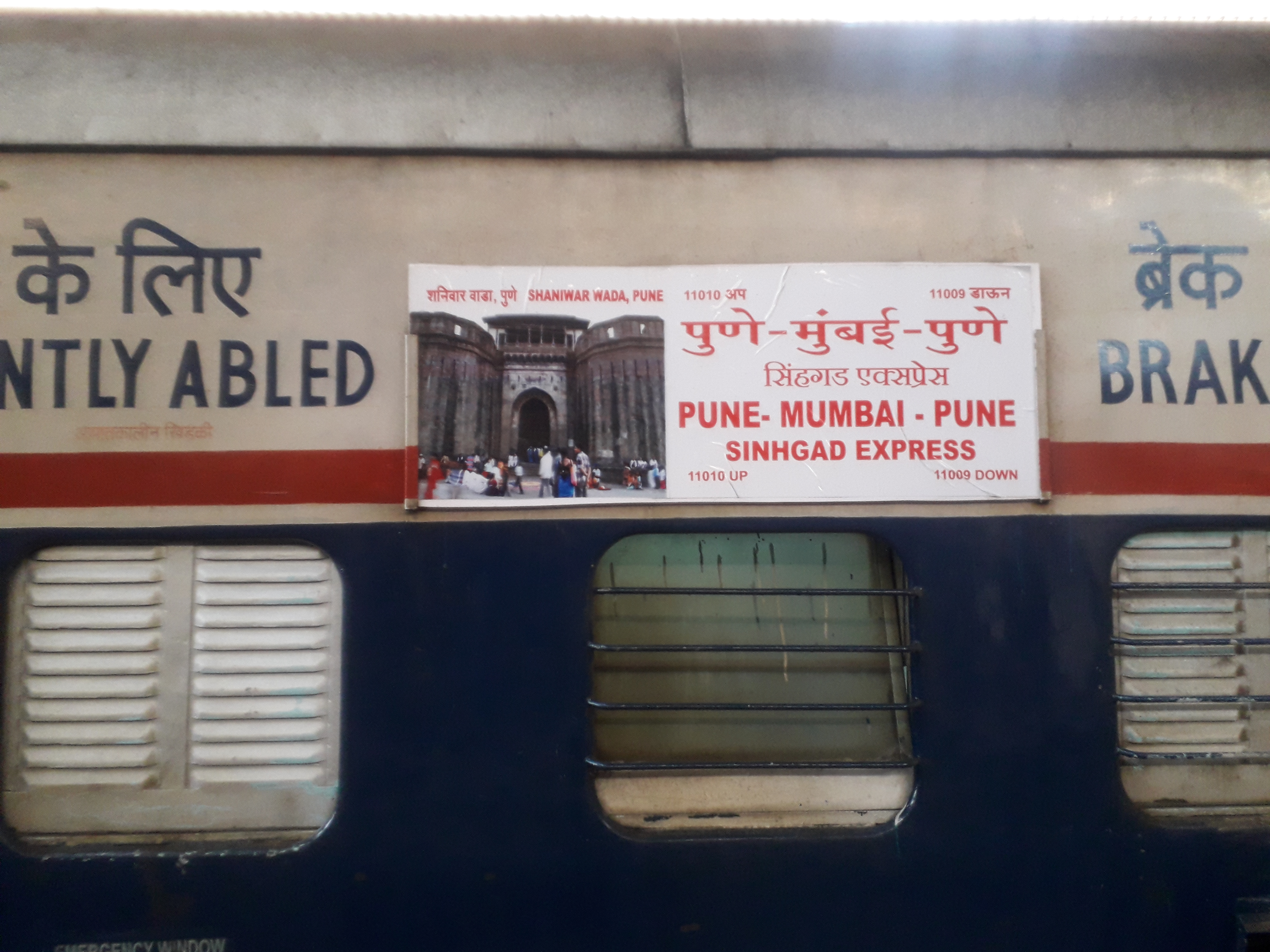
11009 Sinhagad Express – Train board

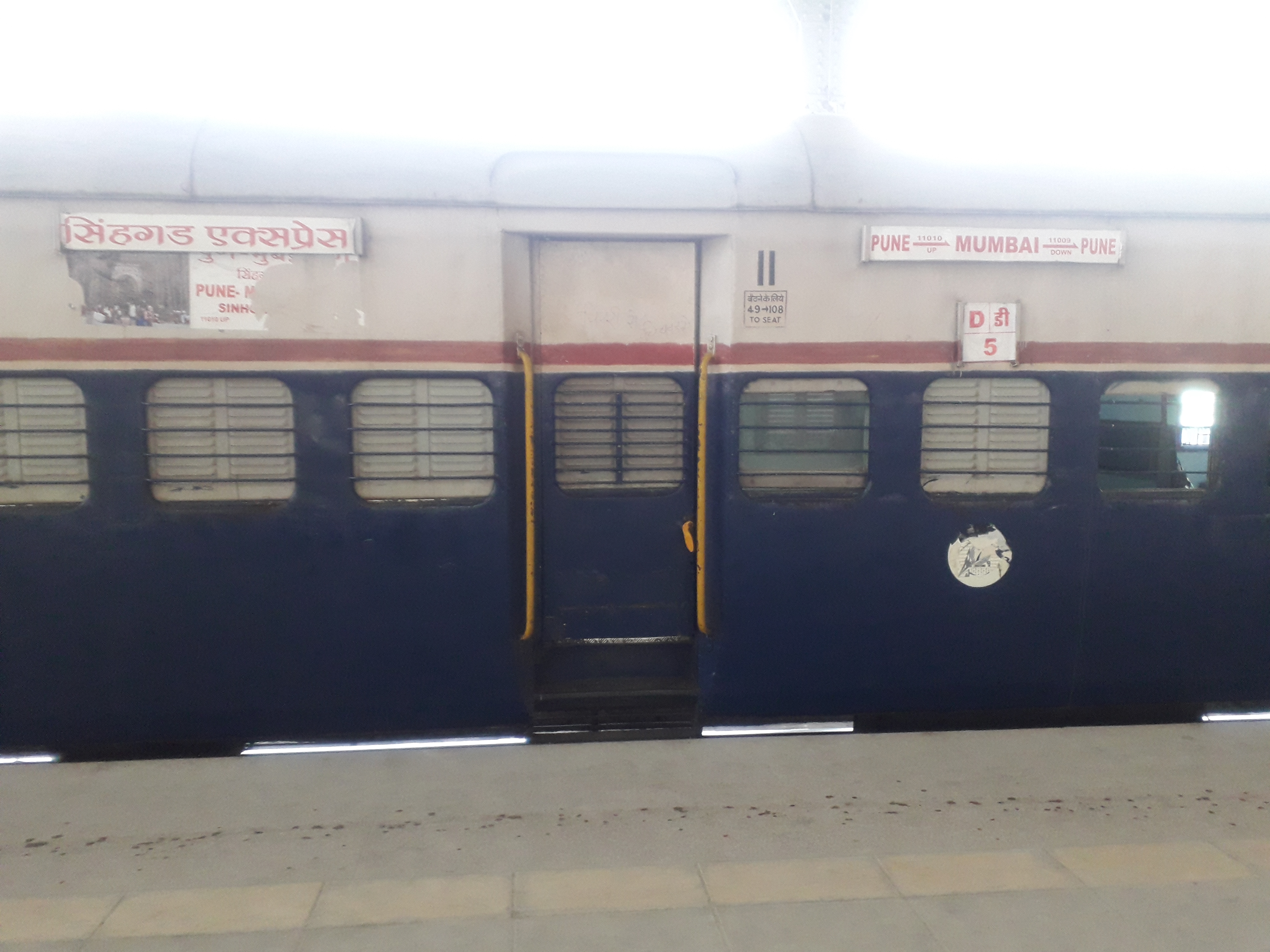
11009 Sinhagad Express – 2nd Class seating (reserved) coach

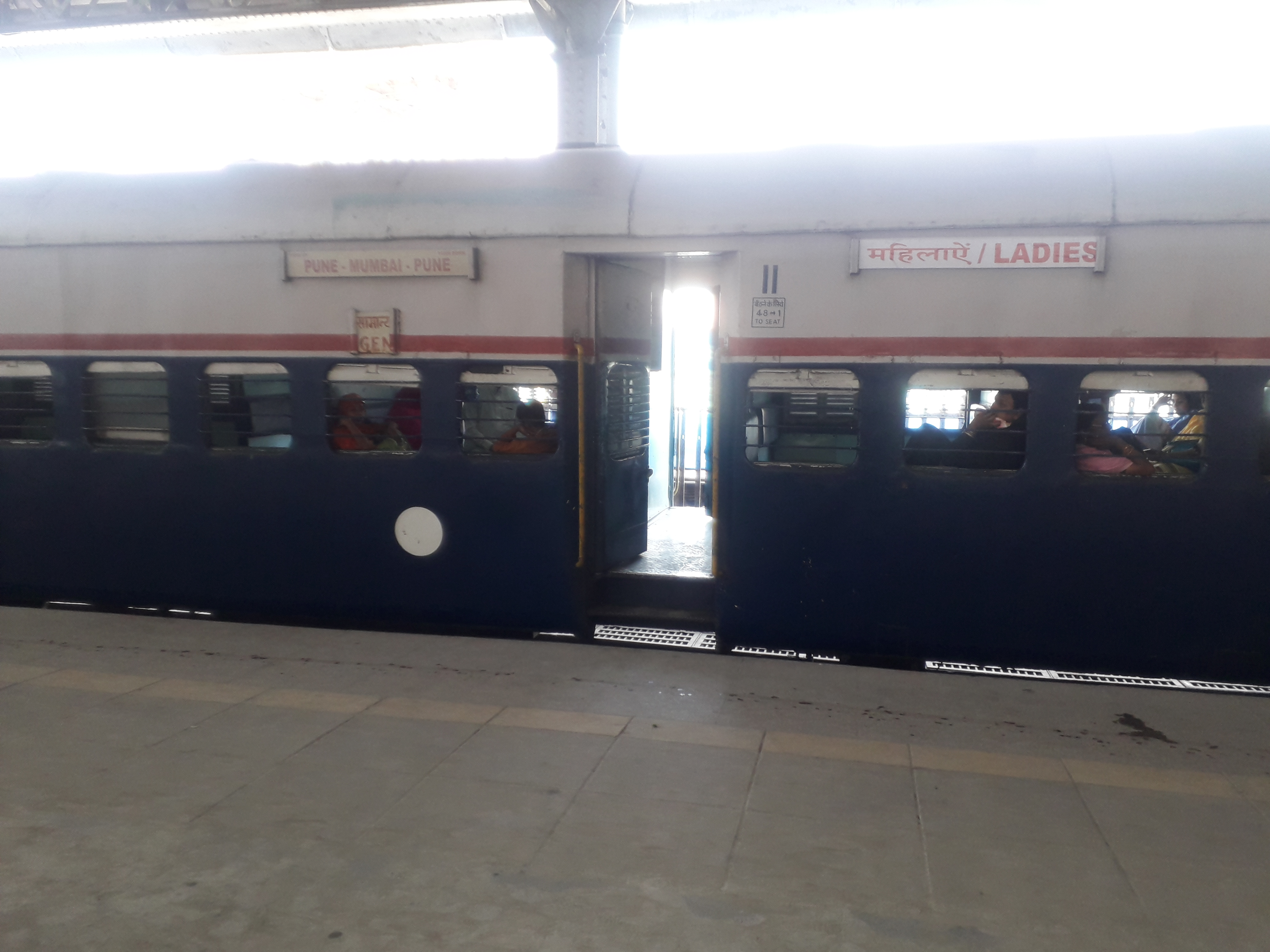
11009 Sinhagad Express – 2nd Class seating (reserved for ladies) coach

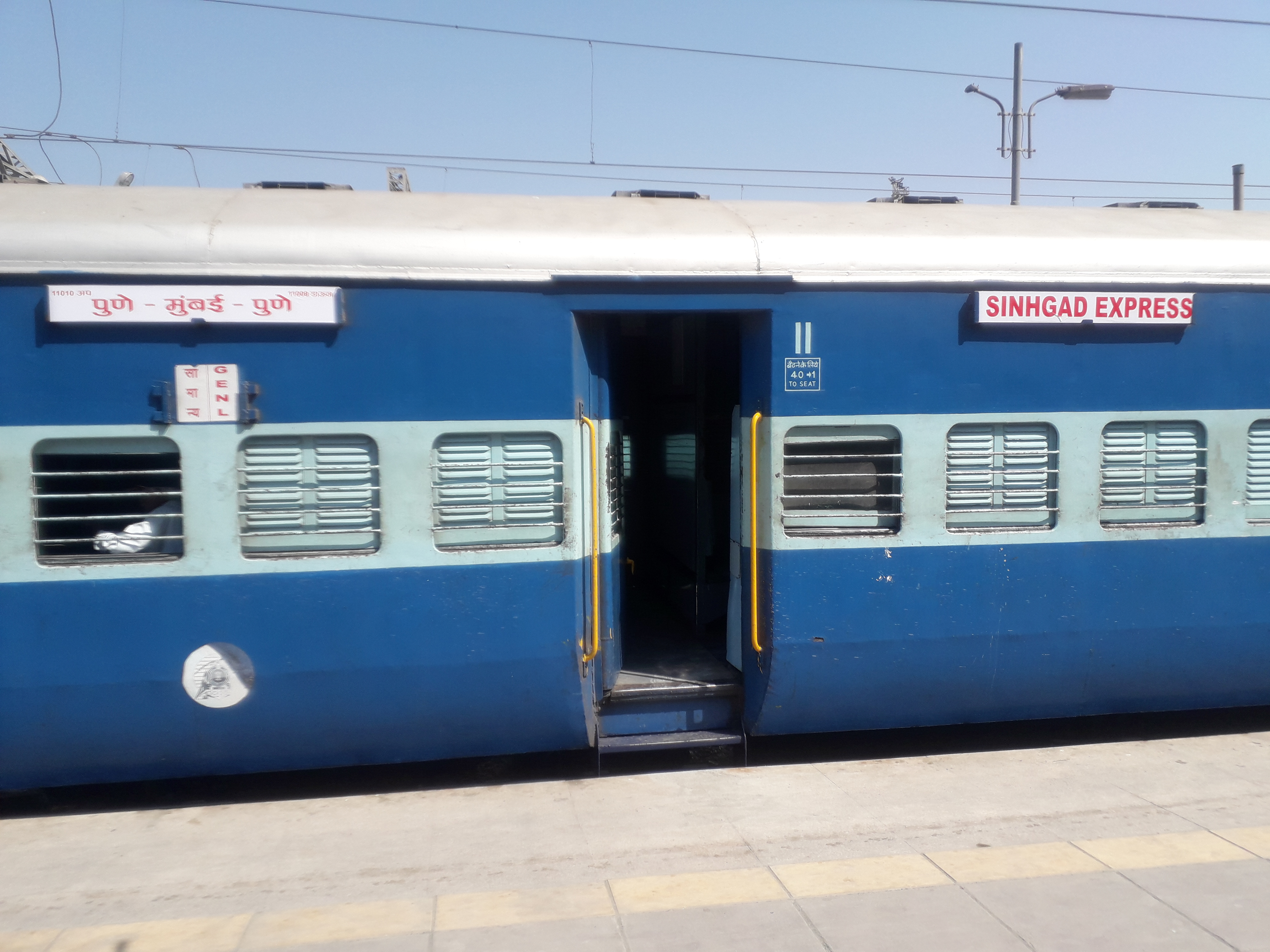
11009 Sinhagad Express – 2nd Class seating – Unreserved coach

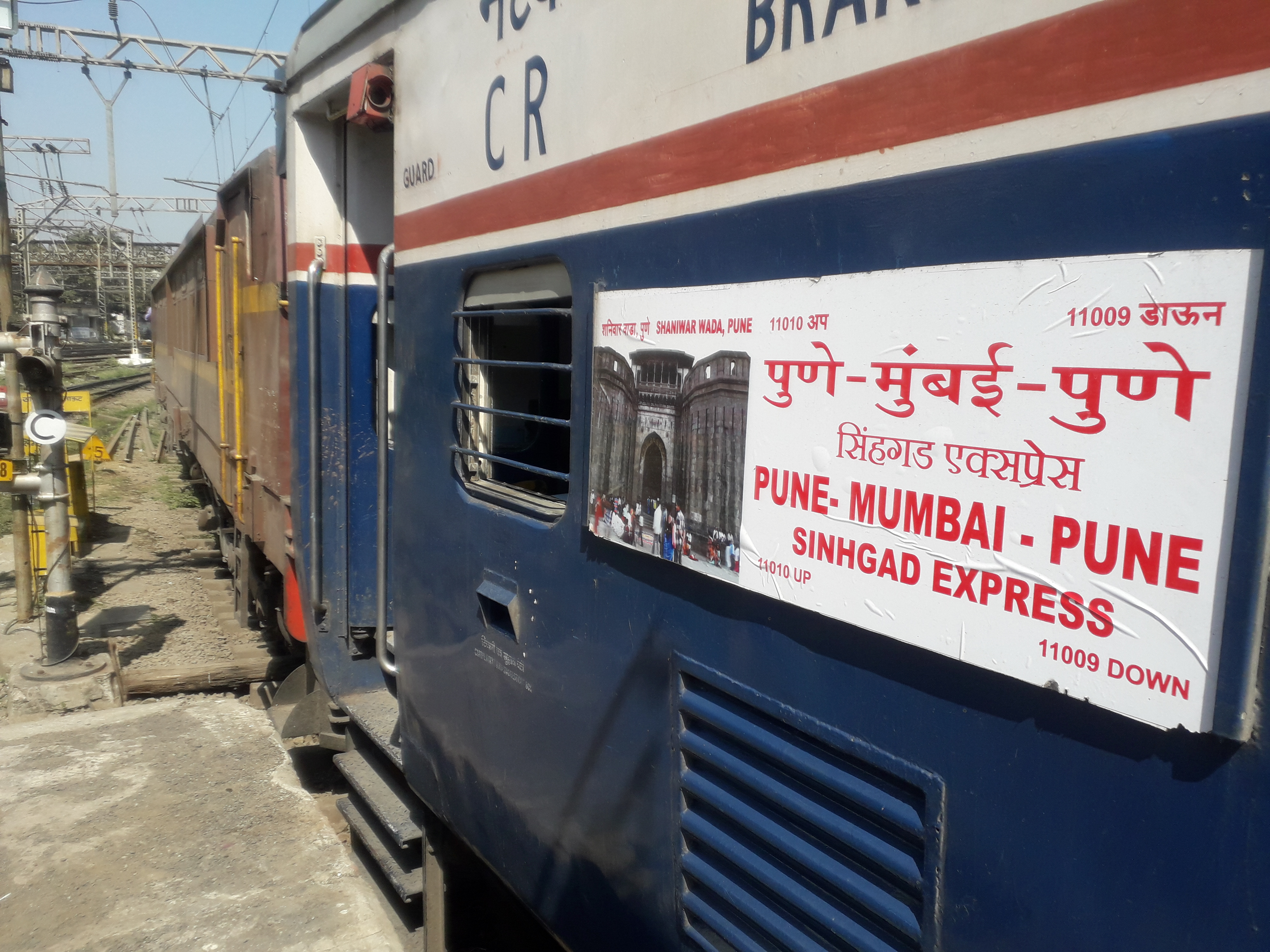
11009 Sinhagad Express with WCAM 2 locomotive

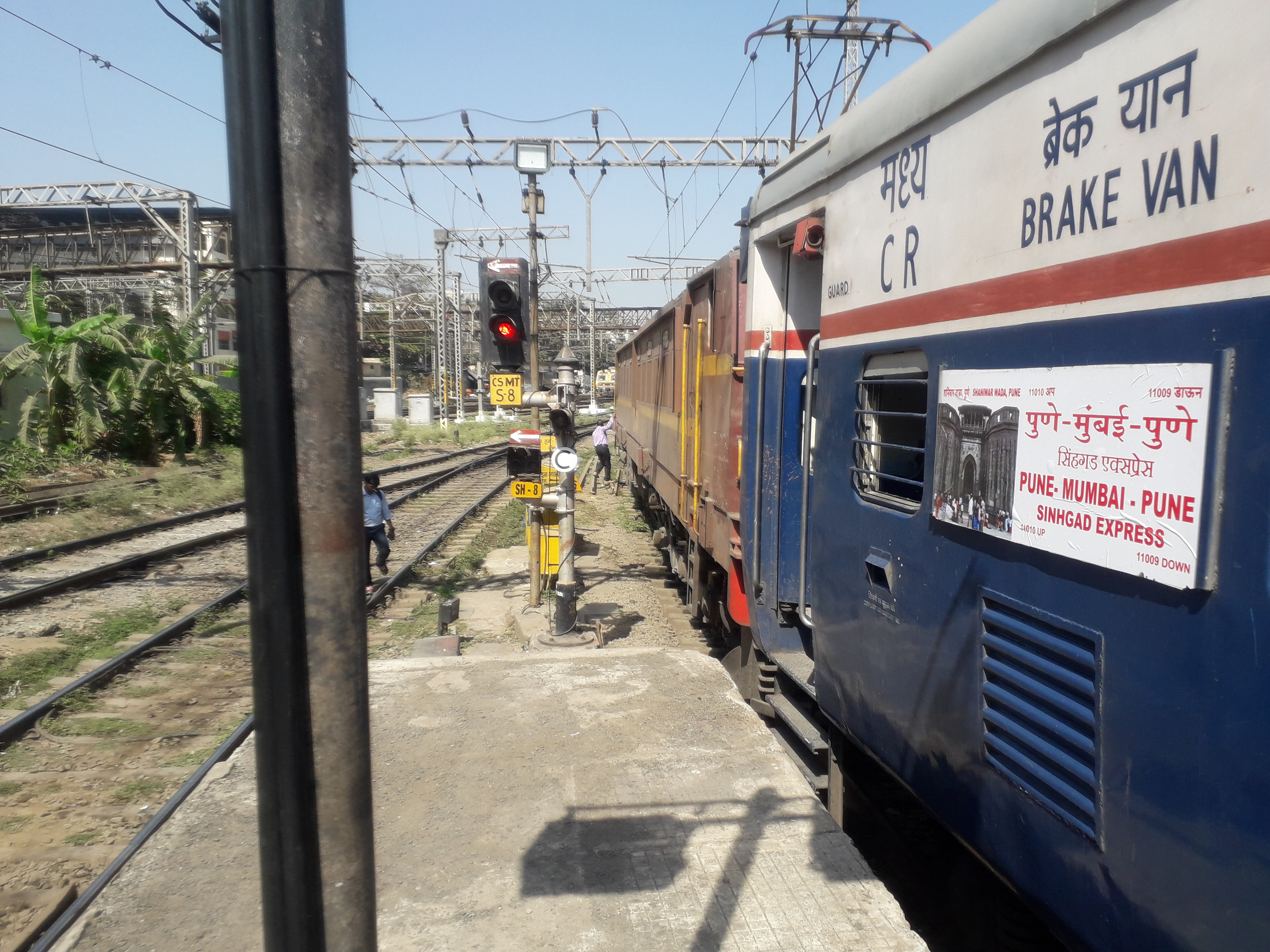
11009 Sinhagad Express – Train board with WCAM 2 locomotive

== Sister trains ==
- Dedicated Mumbai-Pune Intercity trains:

Via Kalyan	Via Panvel	Defunct
Deccan Express	Pragati Express	Pune Mail
Mumbai–Pune Intercity Express	Pragati Express	Mumbai–Pune Shatabdi Express
Indrayani Express	Pragati Express	Mumbai-Pune Passenger
Deccan Queen	Pragati Express	Pune-Mumbai Passenger
	Pragati Express	Mumbai-Pune Janta Express
	Pragati Express	Bombay-Poona Express

== See also ==
- Double Decker Express
