= Mumbai–Pune Shatabdi Express =

Overview
- Service type: Shatabdi Express
- Locale: Maharashtra, India
- First service: 1995
- Last service: 2004
- Current operator: Indian Railways

Route
- Termini: Chhatrapati Shivaji Terminus, Mumbai; Pune Junction
- Stops: 4 + 1 technical halt (Mumbai–Pune); 3 + 1 technical halt (Pune–Mumbai)
- Distance travelled: 192.2 km (119.4 mi)
- Average journey time: 3 hours, 35 minutes
- Service frequency: Daily
- Train number: 12027/12028

On-board services
- Classes: AC Economy, AC Chair Car
- Seating arrangements: Yes
- Sleeping arrangements: No
- Auto-rack arrangements: No
- Observation facilities: No rake sharing, The train used to run as the only premium train between Mumbai and Pune.
- Entertainment facilities: No
- Baggage facilities: No

Technical
- Rolling stock: Kalyan WCAM-3 or WCAM-2/2P locomotive, ICF Shatabdi rake
- Track gauge: 1,676 mm (5 ft 6 in)
- Operating speed: 53.58 km/h (33 mph) with stops
Route map
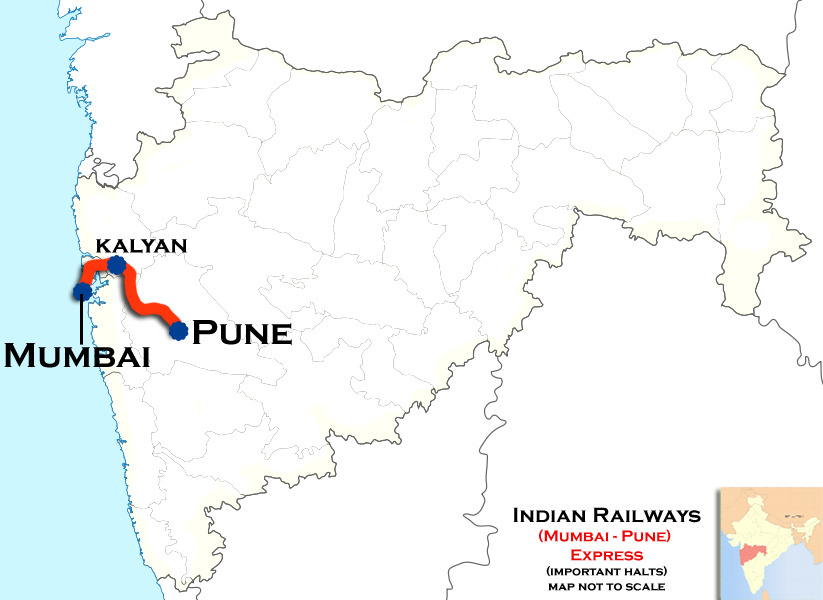

Mumbai–Pune Shatabdi was a train in Shatabdi series of Indian Railways. This was the first dedicated high priority train of Indian Railways between Mumbai and Pune. This was fully air conditioned train. This train used to run in morning 6:45 AM from Mumbai and reach Pune at 09.45 AM and leave Pune at 5:45 PM and reach Mumbai at 8:45 PM in evening. This train was replaced by Mumbai–Pune Intercity Express due to low response. The Intercity also has non-AC compartments. Intercity leaves Mumbai at 6:40 AM and arrives Pune at 9:57 AM and leaves Pune at 5:55 PM and arrives Mumbai at 9:05 PM.

This train was extremely popular as it was initially the fastest and most comfortable way to travel between Mumbai and Pune. With the opening of the Mumbai–Pune Expressway in 2003, demand dropped considerably for luxury train services. In 2004, the service was cancelled.

== See also ==
- Sister trains Mumbai–Pune:
- Via Kalyan
1. Deccan Express
2. Deccan Queen
3. Indrayani Express
4. Intercity Express
5. Sinhagad Express
- Via Panvel
1. Pragati Express
- Defunct
1. Pune Mail
2. Mumbai–Pune Passenger
3. Mumbai-Pune Janta Express
4. Pune-Mumbai Passenger
5. Dadar-Pune Express
