= Pune–Solapur Intercity Express =

Train in India

Pune-Solapur Intercity Superfast Express
Overview
- Service type: Express
- Locale: Maharashtra
- First service: 21 November 2009; 15 years ago
- Current operator(s): Central Railway

Route
- Termini: Pune (PUNE); Solapur (SUR)
- Stops: 3
- Distance travelled: 264 km (164 mi)
- Average journey time: 4 hours (Approx.)
- Service frequency: Daily
- Train number(s): 12169 / 12170

On-board services
- Class(es): AC Chair Car, Second Class seating, General Unreserved
- Seating arrangements: Yes
- Sleeping arrangements: No
- Auto-rack arrangements: Overhead racks
- Catering facilities: On-board catering, E-catering
- Observation facilities: Large windows
- Baggage facilities: No
- Other facilities: Below the seats

Technical
- Rolling stock: LHB coach
- Track gauge: 1,676 mm (5 ft 6 in)
- Operating speed: 65 km/h (40 mph) average including halts.

The 12169 / 12170 Pune-Solapur Intercity Superfast Express is an Express train belonging to Indian Railways that runs between Pune Junction and Solapur Junction. This train will not run on weekends due to doubling of track.

== Coaches ==
The 12169/12170 Pune Solapur Intercity Express presently has 2 AC Chair Car, 8 General Second Class, 2 General Second Class coaches reserved for Pass Holders & 5 General Unreserved coaches.

== Service ==
The 12169/12170 Pune Solapur Intercity Express was first introduced on 21 November 2009 when the 0113/14 Pune Solapur Special was converted to a regular service.

It covers the distance of 264 km (164 mi) in 4 hours approximately.

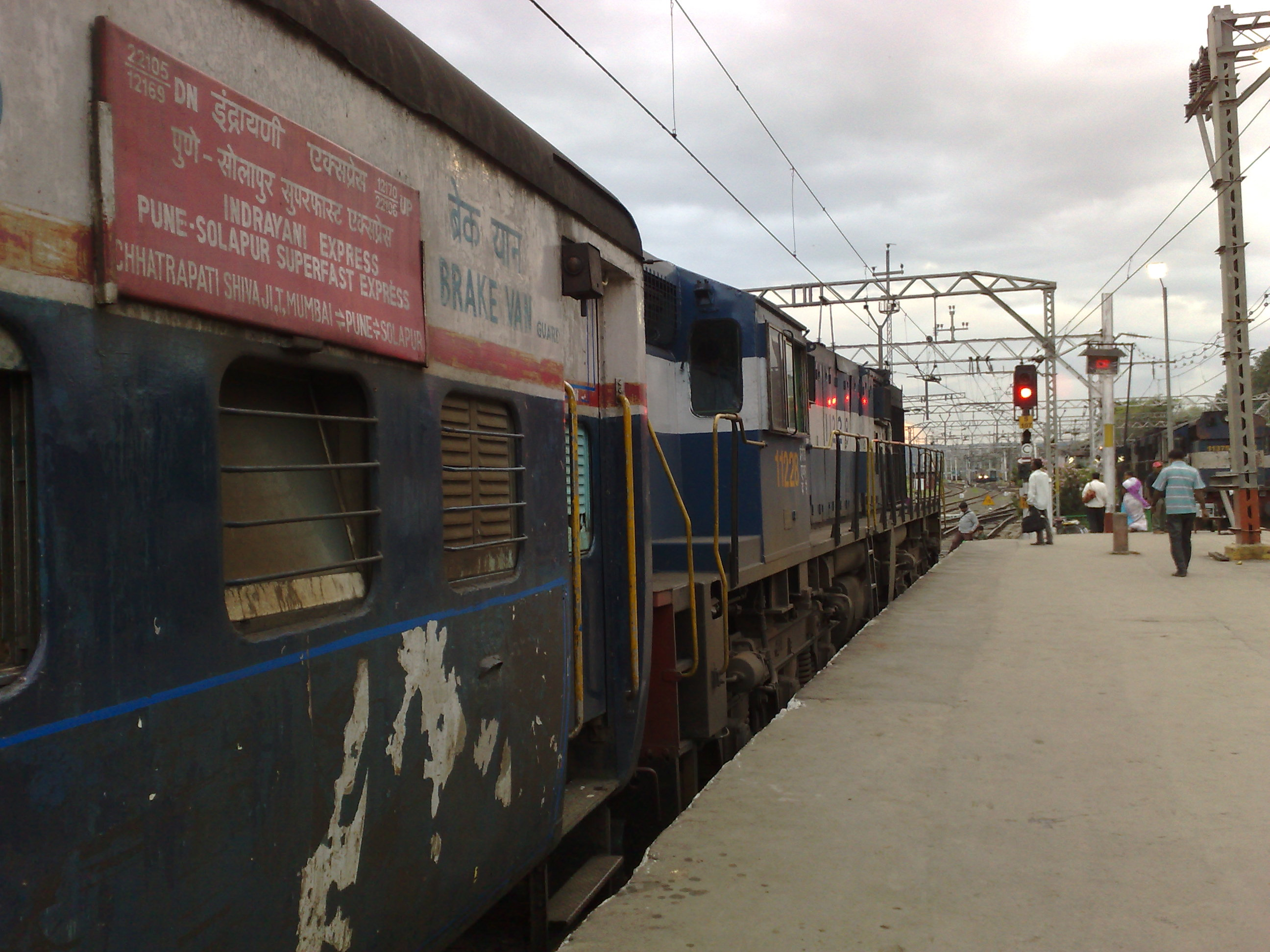
12170 Intercity Express at Pune Junction

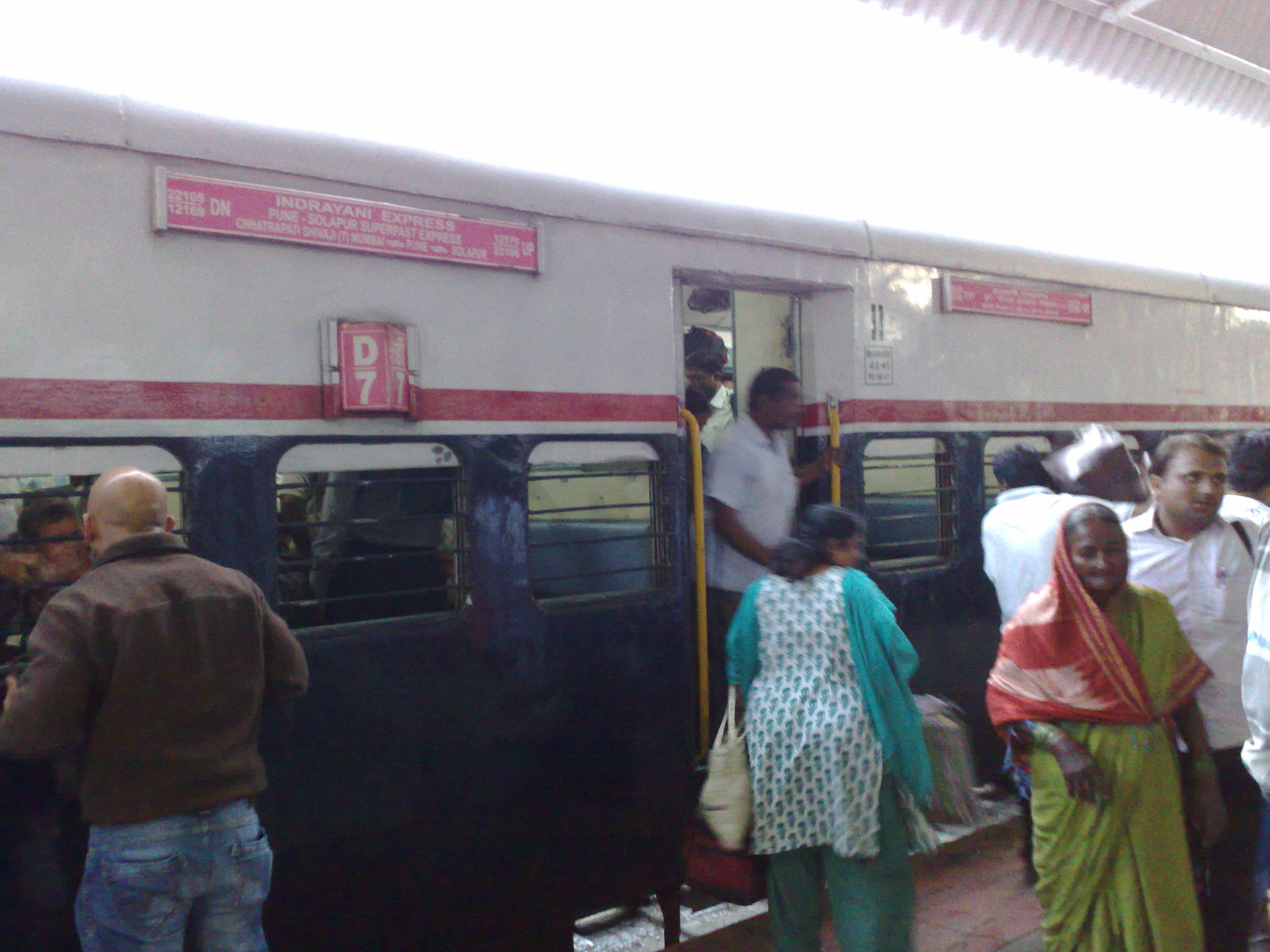
12170 Intercity Express - 2nd Class seating

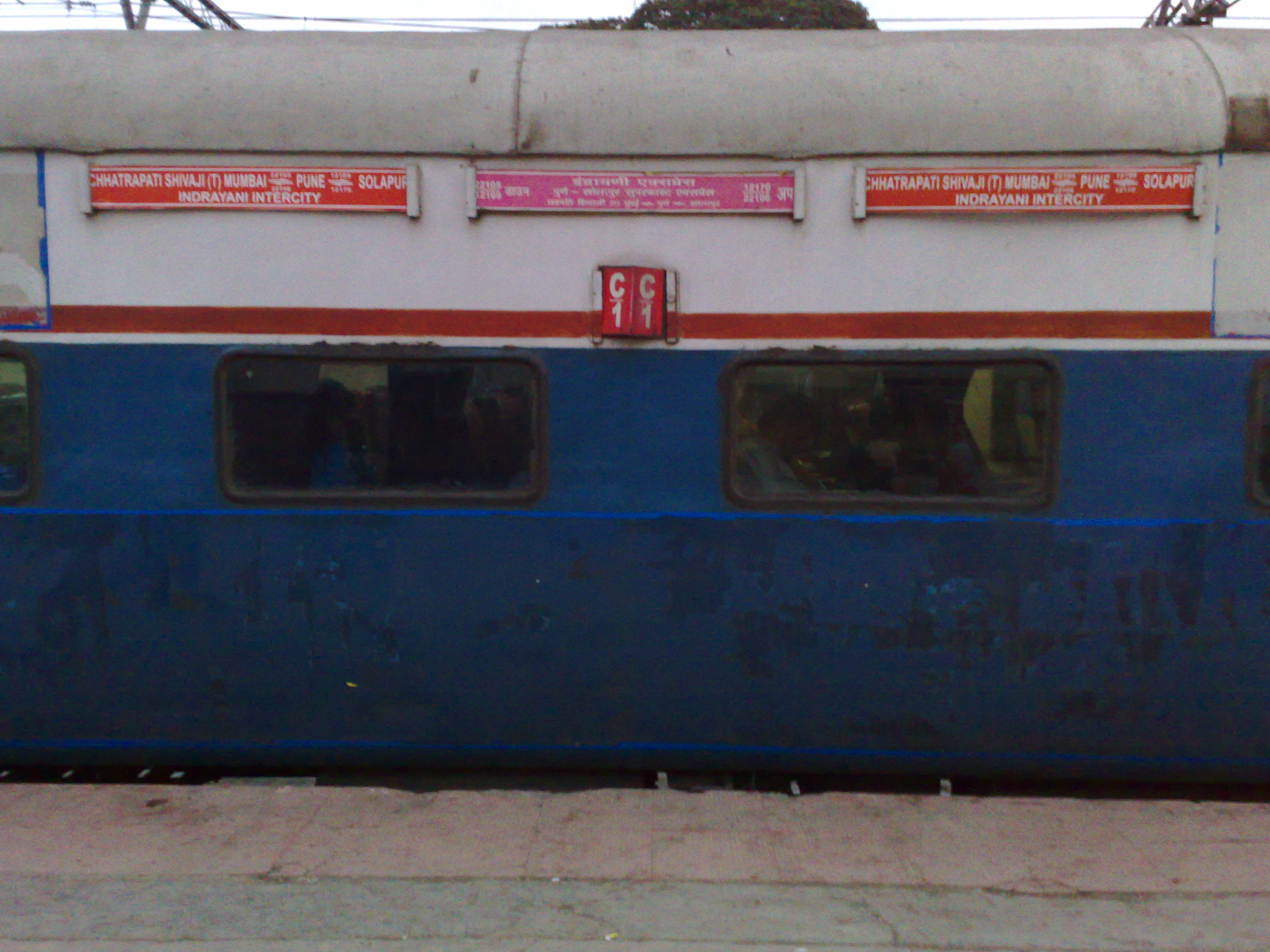
12170 Intercity Express - AC Chair Coach

There is a well justified demand to run this as a direct train from Mumbai to Solapur, and also extend the counterpart Hutatma express between Pune Solapur to CSMT

== See also ==
- Hutatma Express
- Indrayani Express
