= Pune–Lucknow Superfast Express =

Indian express train

Overview
- Service type: Superfast Express
- First service: 6 October 2006; 19 years ago
- Current operator: Central Railway zone

Route
- Termini: Pune Junction (PUNE); Lucknow Junction (LJN)
- Stops: 11
- Distance travelled: 1,481 km (920 mi)
- Average journey time: 24 hours 55 minutes
- Service frequency: Weekly (Note: Runs one day in a week for every direction.)
- Train number: 12103/12104

On-board services
- Classes: AC first-class, AC 2 tier, AC 3 tier, Sleeper class, General Unreserved
- Seating arrangements: No
- Sleeping arrangements: Yes
- Catering facilities: No
- Entertainment facilities: No
- Baggage facilities: Below the seats

Technical
- Rolling stock: 2
- Track gauge: 1,676 mm (5 ft 6 in)
- Operating speed: 59 km/h (37 mph)

Pune–Lucknow Superfast Express is a Superfast Express train of the Indian Railways connecting Pune Junction in Maharashtra and Lucknow Junction of Uttar Pradesh. It is currently being operated with 12103/12104 train numbers on a weekly basis.

== Service ==
The 12103/Pune–Lucknow Jn Superfast Express has an average speed of 59.2 km/h and covers 1481 km in 24 hrs 55 mins. 12104/Lucknow Jn–Pune Superfast Express has an average speed of 58 km/h and covers 1481 km in 25 hrs 35 mins.

== Route and halts ==
The important halts of the train are:

- Pune Junction
- Daund Junction
- Kopargaon
- Manmad Junction
- Bhusaval Junction
- Khandwa Junction
- Itarsi Junction
- Bhopal Junction
- Bina Junction
- Jhansi Junction
- Orai
- Kanpur Central
- Lucknow Junction

== Coach composition ==
The train has standard ICF rakes with max speed of 110 kmph. The train consists of 16 coaches:

- 1 AC II Tier
- 2 AC III Tier
- 5 Sleeper coaches
- 3 General
- 2 Second-class Luggage/parcel van

== Traction ==
Both trains are hauled by a Bhusawal Loco Shed based WAP-4 electric locomotive from Pune to Lucknow and vice versa.

== Direction reversal ==
The train reverses its direction 1 times:

- Daund Junction

== Rake Share ==
This train shares a rake with:-

- Pune–Lucknow Express
- Pune–Amravati Express
- Pune–Danapur Superfast Express
- Pune–Manduadih Gyan Ganga Express

== See also ==
- Pune–Lucknow Express
- Pune–Amravati Express
- Pune–Danapur Superfast Express
- Pune–Manduadih Gyan Ganga Express
- Muzaffarpur - Hadapsar (Pune) AC Express
