= Pune–Ajni AC Superfast Express =

Train in India

Pune Junction – Ajni AC Superfast Express

Overview
- Service type: AC Express
- First service: 12 May 2017; 8 years ago
- Current operator: Central Railway

Route
- Termini: Pune (PUNE); Ajni (AJNI)
- Stops: 8
- Distance travelled: 887 km (551 mi)
- Average journey time: 14 hours
- Service frequency: Weekly.
- Train number: 22123 / 22124

On-board services
- Classes: AC 2 Tier, AC 3 Tier
- Seating arrangements: No
- Sleeping arrangements: Yes
- Catering facilities: Available
- Observation facilities: Large windows
- Baggage facilities: Available
- Other facilities: Below the seats

Technical
- Rolling stock: LHB coach
- Track gauge: 1,676 mm (5 ft 6 in)
- Operating speed: 130 km/h (81 mph) maximum, 60 km/h (37 mph) average including halts
Route map
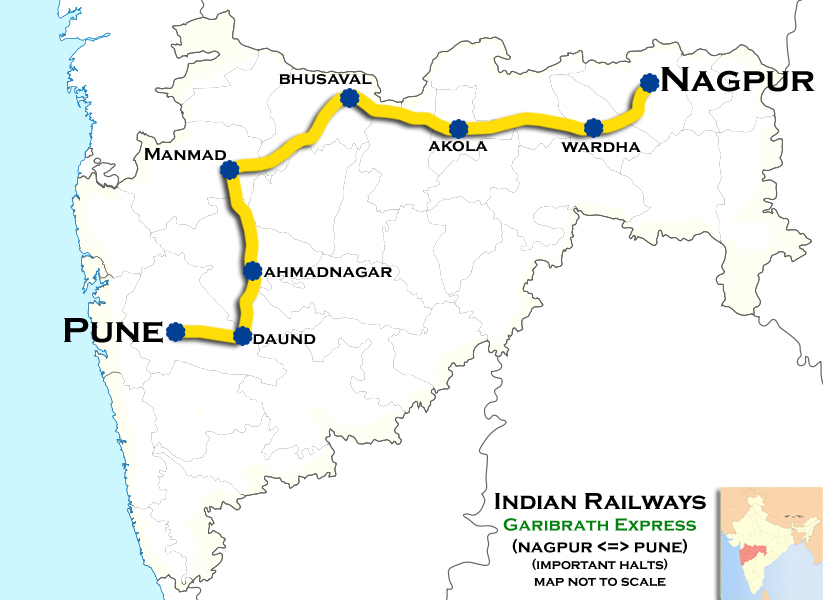

The 22123 / 22124 Pune–Ajni AC Superfast Express is a AC express train of the AC Express series belonging to Indian Railways – Central Railway zone that runs between Pune Junction and Ajni in India.

It operates as train number 22123 from Pune Junction to Ajni and as train number 22124 in the reverse direction, serving the state of Maharashtra.

== Coaches ==
The 22123 / 24 Pune–Ajni AC Superfast Express has 9 AC 3 tier, 4 AC 2 Tier & 2 End on Generator coaches. It doesn't carry a pantry car .

As is customary with most train services in India, coach composition may be amended at the discretion of Indian Railways depending on demand.

Loco	1	2	3	4	5	6	7	8	9	10	11	12	13	14	15	16
	EOG	H1	A4	A3	A2	A1	B9	B8	B7	B6	B5	B4	B3	B2	B1	EOG

- EOG consists of Luggage and Generator coach
- B consists of AC 3 Tier coach
- PC consists of Pantry car coach
- A consists of AC 2 Tier coach
- H consists of First Class AC cCoach

== Service ==
The 22123 Pune–Ajni AC Superfast Express covers the distance of 887 km (551 mi) in 14 hours (63.00 km/h) and in 15 hours 55 mins as 22124 Ajni–Pune AC Superfast Express (56.00 km/h).

As the average speed of the train is above 55 km/h (34 mph), as per Indian Railways rules, its fare includes a Superfast Express surcharge.

== Routeing ==
The 22123 / 24 Pune–Ajni AC Superfast Express runs from Pune Junction via Daund Junction, Manmad Junction, Jalgaon Junction, Bhusaval Junction,Nandura, Akola Junction, Badnera Junction, Wardha Junction to Ajni.

== Traction ==
As the route is fully electrified, an Ajni Loco Shed-based WAP-7 electric locomotive powers the train up to its destination.

== Rake sharing ==
- 22117 / 22118 Pune–Amravati AC Superfast Express
- 22125 / 22126 Nagpur–Amritsar AC Superfast Express

== Operation ==
- 22123 Pune–Ajni AC Superfast Express leaves Pune Junction every Friday & arriving Ajni on next day.
- 22124 Ajni–Pune AC Superfast Express leaves Ajni every Tuesday & arriving Pune Junction on next day.
