= Pune–Amravati AC Superfast Express =

Train in India

Pune Junction – Amravati AC Superfast Express

Overview
- Service type: AC Express
- First service: 10 May 2017; 9 years ago
- Current operator: Central Railway

Route
- Termini: Pune (PUNE); Amravati (AMI)
- Stops: 9
- Distance travelled: 725 km (450 mi)
- Average journey time: 13 hours
- Service frequency: Weekly
- Train number: 22117 / 22118

On-board services
- Classes: AC First Class, AC 2 Tier, AC 3 Tier
- Seating arrangements: No
- Sleeping arrangements: Yes
- Catering facilities: Available
- Observation facilities: Large windows
- Baggage facilities: Available
- Other facilities: Below the seats

Technical
- Rolling stock: LHB coach
- Track gauge: 1,676 mm (5 ft 6 in)
- Operating speed: 130 km/h (81 mph) maximum, 60 km/h (37 mph) average including halts.

The 22117 / 22118 Pune–Amravati AC Superfast Express is a Superfast Express train of the AC Express series belonging to Indian Railways – Central Railway zone that runs between Pune Junction and Amravati in India.

It operates as train number 22117 from Pune Junction to Amravati and as train number 22118 in the reverse direction, serving the states of Maharashtra.

== Coaches ==
The 22117 / 18 Pune Junction–Amravati AC Superfast Express has 9 AC 3 tier, 4 AC 2 Tier & 2 End on Generator coaches. It doesn't carry a pantry car .

As is customary with most train services in India, coach composition may be amended at the discretion of Indian Railways depending on demand.

Loco	1	2	3	4	5	6	7	8	9	10	11	12	13	14	15	16
	EOG	H1	A4	A3	A2	A1	B9	B8	B7	B6	B5	B4	B3	B2	B1	EOG

- EOG consists of Luggage and Generator coach
- B consists of AC 3 Tier coach
- PC consists of Pantry car coach
- A consists of AC 2 Tier coach
- H consists of First Class AC coach

== Service ==
The 22117 Pune Junction–Amravati AC Superfast Express covers the distance of 725 km (450 mi) in 12 hours (60.00 km/h) and in 13 hours 5 mins as 22118 Amravati–Pune Junction AC Superfast Express (55.00 km/h).

As the average speed of the train is above 55 km/h (34 mph), as per Indian Railways rules, its fare includes a Superfast surcharge.

== Routeing ==
The 22117 / 18 Pune Junction–Amravati AC Superfast Express runs from Pune Junction via Daund Chord Line, Ahilyanagar, Manmad Junction, Jalgaon Junction, Bhusaval Junction, Malkapur, Akola Junction, Badnera Junction to Amravati.

== Traction ==
As the route is fully electrified, an Ajni-based WAP-7 or WAP-1 locomotive powers the train to its destination.

== Rake sharing ==
22123/24 – Pune–Ajni AC Superfast Express 22125/26 - Nagpur-Amritsar AC Superfast Express

== Operation ==
- 22117 Pune Junction–Amravati AC Superfast Express leaves Pune Junction every Wednesday & arriving Amravati the next day.
- 22118 Amravati–Pune Junction AC Superfast Express leaves Amravati every Thursday & arriving Pune Junction the next day.
