= Pune–Lucknow Express =

Overview
- Service type: Express
- First service: 10 February 2015; 10 years ago
- Current operator: Central Railway zone

Route
- Termini: Pune Junction (PUNE); Lucknow Junction (LJN)
- Stops: 12
- Distance travelled: 1,481 km (920 mi)
- Average journey time: 28 hours 30 minutes
- Service frequency: Weekly (Note: Runs one day in a week for every direction.)
- Train number: 11407/11408

On-board services
- Classes: AC 2 tier, AC 3 tier, Sleeper class, General Unreserved
- Seating arrangements: No
- Sleeping arrangements: Yes
- Catering facilities: No
- Entertainment facilities: No
- Baggage facilities: Below the seats

Technical
- Rolling stock: 2
- Track gauge: 1,676 mm (5 ft 6 in)
- Operating speed: 52 km/h (32 mph)

Pune–Lucknow Express is an Express train of the Indian Railways connecting Pune Junction in Maharashtra and Lucknow Junction of Uttar Pradesh. It is currently being operated with 11407/11408 train numbers on a weekly basis.

== Service ==
The 11407/Pune–Lucknow Express has an average speed of 52 km/h and covers 1481 km in 28 hrs 30 mins. 11408/Lucknow–Pune Express has an average speed of 52 km/h and covers 1481 km in 28 hrs 30 mins.

== Route and halts ==
The important halts of the train are:

- Pune Junction
- Daund Junction
- Ahilyanagar
- Kopargaon
- Manmad Junction
- Jalgaon Junction
- Bhusaval Junction
- Khandwa Junction
- Itarsi Junction
- Rani Kamalapati
- Bhopal Junction
- Bina Junction
- Jhansi Junction
- Orai
- Kanpur Central
- Lucknow Junction

== Coach composition ==
The train has standard ICF rakes with max speed of 110 kmph. The train consists of 16 coaches:

- 1 AC II Tier
- 2 AC III Tier
- 5 Sleeper coaches
- 6 General
- 2 Second-class Luggage/parcel van

== Traction ==
Both trains are hauled by a Bhusawal Loco Shed-based WAP-4 electric locomotive from Pune to Lucknow and vice versa.

== Direction reversal ==
The train reverses its direction 1 times:

- Daund Junction

== Rake share ==
This train shares a rake 11405/11406 Pune–Amravati Express.

== See also ==
- Pune–Amravati Express
- Pune–Danapur Superfast Express
- Pune–Manduadih Gyan Ganga Express
