= Deccan Queen =

Train in India

Deccan Queen Express
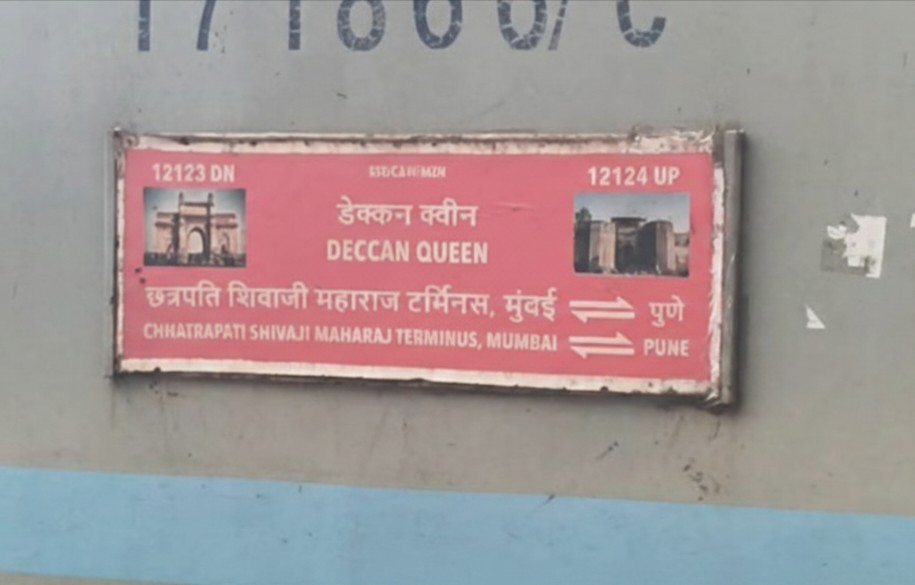
- CSMT - PUNE Deccan Queen Express Train board

Overview
- Service type: Superfast
- Locale: Maharashtra
- First service: 1 June 1930; 96 years ago
- Current operator: Central Railway

Route
- Termini: Mumbai CSMT (CSMT); Pune Junction (PUNE)
- Stops: 3 (+2 technical halt)
- Distance travelled: 192 km (119 mi)
- Average journey time: 3 hours 10 minutes
- Service frequency: Daily
- Train number: 12123 / 12124

On-board services
- Classes: Vistadome, AC Chair Car, Chair Car, Second sitting(2S)
- Seating arrangements: Yes
- Sleeping arrangements: No
- Auto-rack arrangements: No
- Catering facilities: Available
- Observation facilities: Large windows
- Baggage facilities: Below the seats
- Other facilities: Dining car

Technical
- Rolling stock: LHB coach
- Track gauge: 1,676 mm (5 ft 6 in)
- Operating speed: 130 km/h (81 mph) maximum speed, 60 km/h (37 mph) average with halts.
Route map
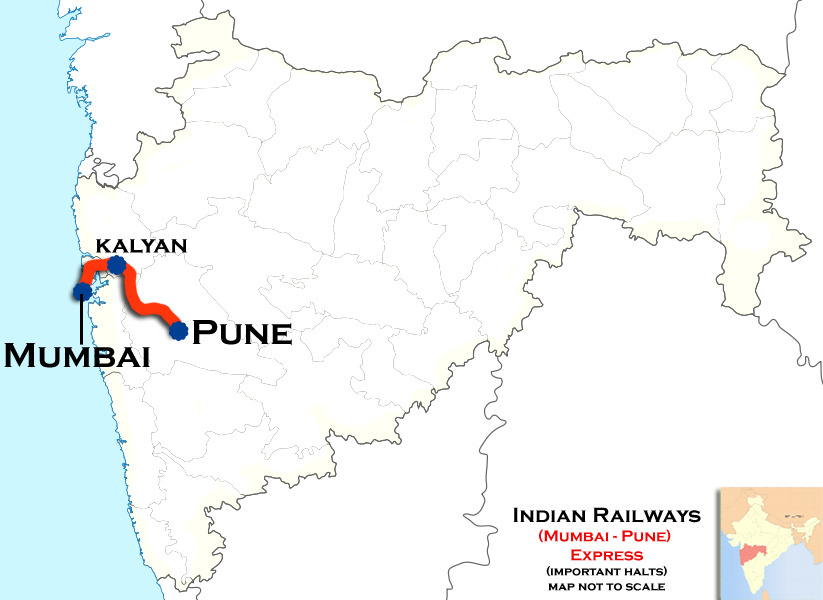

The 12123 / 12124 Deccan Queen is a daily Indian passenger train service operated by the Central Railway zone of the Indian Railways connecting the cities of Mumbai and Pune. Introduced on June 1, 1930, the Deccan Queen was India's "first superfast train, first long-distance electric-hauled train, first vestibuled train, the first train to have a ‘women-only’ car, and the first train to feature a dining car". The service name comes from the Marathi nickname "दख्खन ची राणी" (Queen of the Deccan), a popular nickname for Pune. Deccan Queen is one of the fastest train services linking Chhatrapati Shivaji Maharaj Terminus and Pune Junction. It has an average operating speed of 60 km/h (37 mph) including stops, and a top speed of 105 km/h (65 mph). The train's long history and common use as a commuter train has gained it significant popularity, including annual celebrations of its "birthday" on June 1 at Pune Junction. It was hauled by a Kalyan-based WCAM-3 end to end up until June 2022. From June 2022, its upgraded coaches in a new livery are being hauled by a Ajni-based WAP-7.

== History ==
The Deccan Queen was introduced on 1 June 1930 as a weekend train, initially operating between Pune and Kalyan (then known as Callian), in the Bombay Presidency of British India. It was introduced with two rakes of seven coaches each. The service was primarily intended to transport horse-racing enthusiasts from Bombay (now Mumbai) to Pune (then Poona), where races were held at the Pune Race Course.

Initially, the Deccan Queen had two rakes of seven coaches each. One rake was painted silver with scarlet mouldings, while the other was painted royal blue with gold lines. The underframes of the original coaches were built in England, while their bodies were manufactured at the Matunga Workshop of the Great Indian Peninsula Railway.

The train initially offered only first and second-class accommodation. First class was abolished on 1 January 1949, and the existing second class was redesignated as first class. This arrangement continued until June 1955, when third-class accommodation was introduced for the first time. In 1966, the original coaches were replaced by anti-telescopic, steel-bodied integral coaches manufactured by the Integral Coach Factory (ICF), Perambur. The rake was also expanded from seven to twelve coaches. In April 1974, third-class accommodation was redesignated as second class.

The Deccan Queen is particularly popular among railway enthusiasts and regular commuters. Every year on 1 June, its regular passengers, railfans and railway officials celebrate the train's anniversary at Pune railway station. On 1 June 2019, the train completed 89 years of service and entered its 90th year.

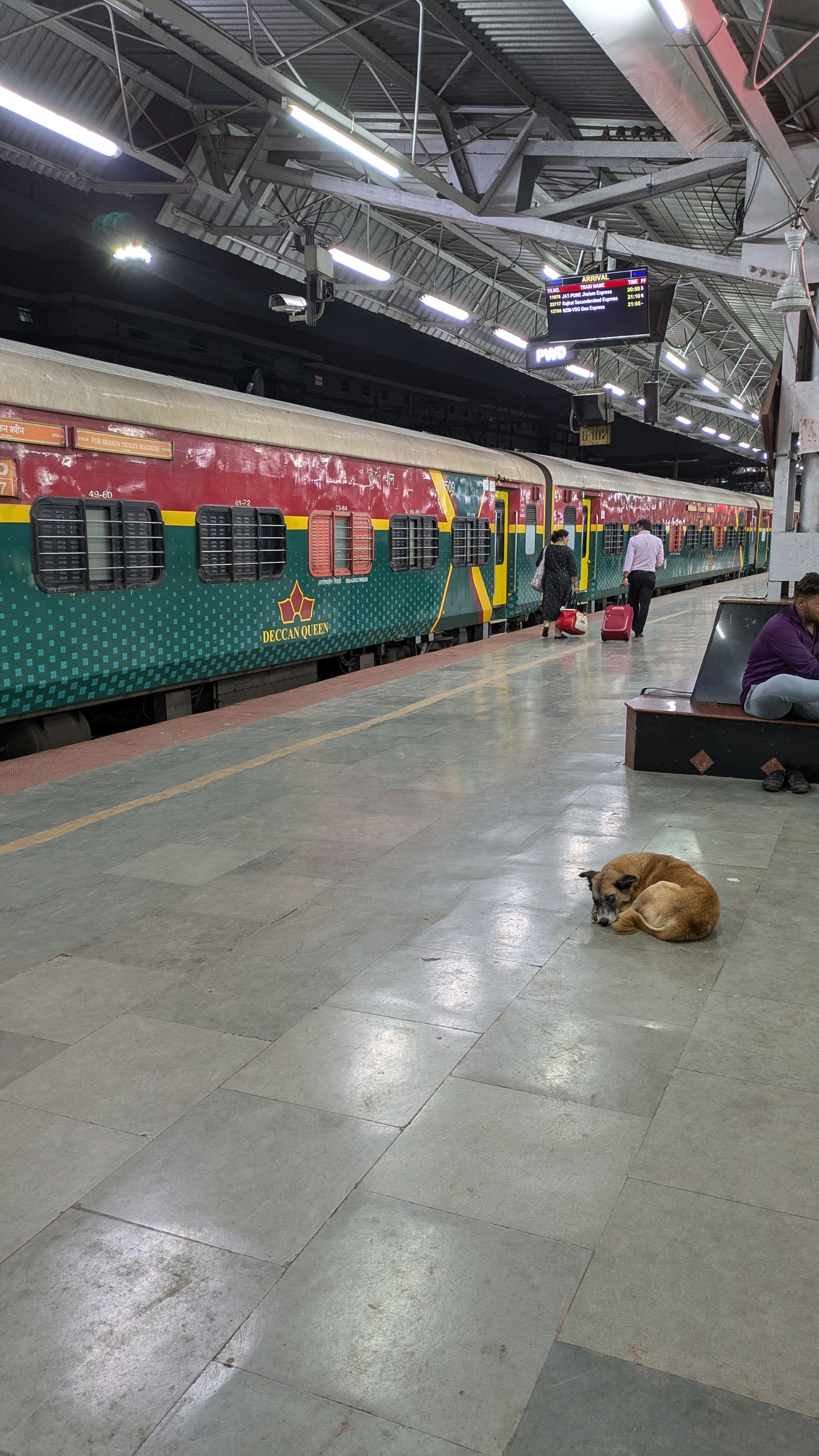
Pearly green rakes of Deccan queen resting at Pune jn

In May 2020, the Ministry of Railways finalised a new exterior livery for the Deccan Queen, named "Restrained Imperium", featuring red, green and yellow stripes. The design was developed with the involvement of the National Institute of Design (NID), Ahmedabad, following consultations with regular commuters and field visits. The train was also scheduled for an upgrade to German-designed Linke Hofmann Busch (LHB) coaches, offering improved safety, suspension and passenger comfort.

The upgraded LHB rake entered service on 22 June 2022. It included a dedicated air-conditioned dining car, retaining one of the train's distinctive features. The new rake also included a Vistadome coach.

=== Incidents ===
On 29 December 1953, the Bombay-bound Deccan Queen collided with another local train at Masjid Bunder station at approximately 10:25 hours. Five persons sustained grievous injuries, while 42 others suffered minor injuries. The approximate cost of damage to railway property was ₹12,600 (equivalent to ₹1.4 million or US$15,000 in 2026). The Government Inspector of Railways, Bombay, conducted a statutory inquiry into the accident. His provisional finding attributed the accident to the failure on the part of the Deccan Queen's driver.

In 1990, the Deccan Queen derailed at Khandala Ghat following heavy rainfall, causing several coaches to go off the tracks. No casualties were reported in the incident.

The Deccan Queen's services were disrupted in late July and early August 2005 following the heavy rainfall and flooding in Mumbai on 26 July. The train was among several long-distance services cancelled on 26 July due to incessant rainfall. On 29 July, its scheduled departure from Mumbai CST was delayed by two hours, from 5:10 pm to 7:10 pm. Long-distance train services on the Central Railway remained suspended until 6 August due to extensive damage to railway tracks caused by flooding.

On 30 November 2006, a mob of approximately 6,000 protesters stopped the Deccan Queen near Ulhasnagar and set five of its coaches on fire after asking passengers to alight. The arson was part of widespread protests across Maharashtra following the alleged desecration of a statue of B. R. Ambedkar in Kanpur, Uttar Pradesh. The incident had no direct connection with the train itself. No injuries were reported among the Deccan Queen's passengers.

== Schedule ==
This service consists of two routes:

- 12124 Pune–Mumbai Deccan Queen leaves Pune Junction every day at 0715 hrs IST and reaches Mumbai CSMT at 1025 hrs IST. The train makes no scheduled stops between Pune Junction and Lonavala, where it arrives at 0806 hrs and departs at 0807 hrs. It then crosses the Bhor Ghat and skips Karjat. The train next stops at Dadar railway station, approximately 119 km from Lonavala, before terminating at Mumbai CSMT.
- 12123 Mumbai–Pune Deccan Queen leaves Mumbai CSMT every day at 1710 hrs IST and reaches Pune Junction at 2025 hrs IST. On its way, the train halts at Karjat, approximately 100 km from Mumbai CSMT, and then at Lonavala after crossing the Bhor Ghat. It subsequently halts at Shivajinagar before terminating at Pune Junction.

The Pune–Mumbai service is scheduled to complete its journey in 3 hours and 10 minutes, making it the fastest scheduled train between Pune Junction and Mumbai CSMT.

== Rake ==
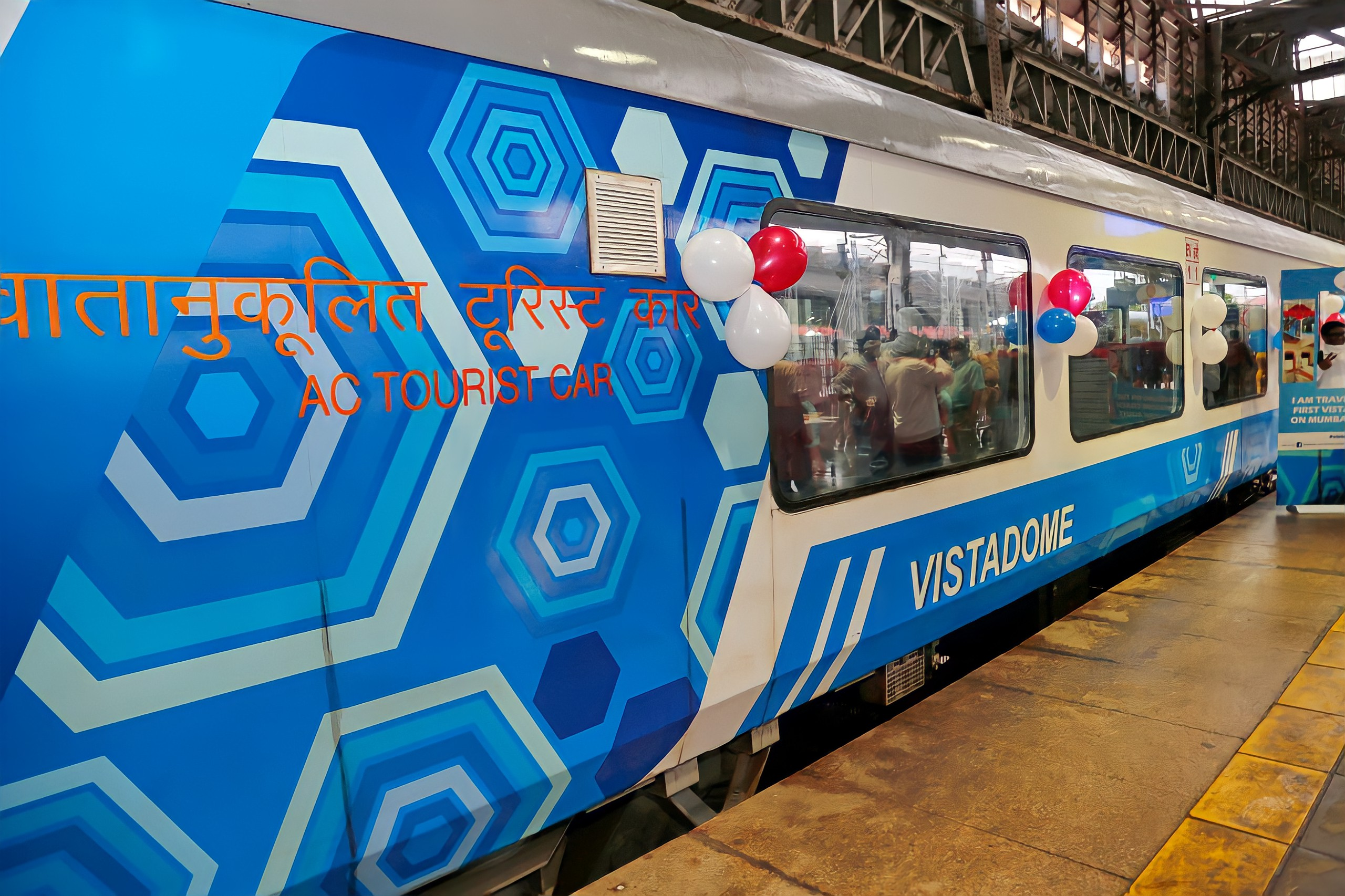
Deccan Queen Vistadome Coach 2021

Initially, the Deccan Queen operated with two different rakes of seven coaches each. One rake was painted silver with scarlet mouldings, while the other was painted royal blue with gold lines. The underframes of the original coaches were built in England, while their bodies were manufactured at the Matunga Workshop of the Great Indian Peninsula Railway.

The train initially offered only first-class and second-class accommodation. First class was abolished on 1 January 1949, and second class was redesignated as first class. This arrangement continued until June 1955, when third-class accommodation was introduced for the first time. In 1966, the original seven-coach rakes were replaced with anti-telescopic, steel-bodied integral coaches manufactured by the Integral Coach Factory (ICF), Perambur, and the rake length was increased to twelve coaches.

The Deccan Queen eventually operated with ICF-manufactured coaches built in India. Over the years, the rake was expanded to 17 coaches, accommodating different categories of passengers, including AC chair car, second-class chair car, general and ladies' compartments, as well as facilities for monthly season-ticket holders. The train also had a dedicated dining car. The coach composition changed over time to accommodate passenger requirements.

The Mumbai-Pune route passes through the steep gradients of Bhor Ghat, between Karjat and Lonavala, where banker locomotives have been used to provide additional traction to trains travelling uphill.

On 22 June 2022, the Deccan Queen was upgraded with 16 Linke Hofmann Busch (LHB) coaches manufactured in India under Project Utkrisht, replacing its earlier conventional rake of 17 coaches. The new coaches featured modern amenities such as LED lighting, bio-toilets and Braille signage. The revised rake included four AC chair cars, eight second-class chair cars, a Vistadome coach, a dedicated dining car, a general second-class-cum-guard's brake van and a generator car.

The train retained its distinctive dining car, which was also upgraded to an LHB design. The Deccan Queen had earlier received ISO 9001 certification in October 2003 for its management systems, covering the maintenance of coaches, pantry and brake systems.

Mumbai CSMT–Pune Junction

Loco	1	2	3	4	5	6	7	8	9	10	11	12	13	14	15	16	17
	HP/SLR	(Second MST)	(Second MST)	GEN	GEN	D5	D4	D3	Dining cum pantry car	C4	C3	(AC MST)	(AC MST)	D2	D1 (LADIES)	GEN	SLR/HP

Pune Junction–Mumbai CSMT

17	16	15	14	13	12	11	10	9	8	7	6	5	4	3	2	1	Loco
HP/SLR	(Second MST)	(Second MST)	GEN	GEN	D5	D4	D3	Dining cum Pantry Car	C4	C3	(AC MST)	(AC MST)	D2	D1 (LADIES)	GEN	SLR/HP	

=== Locomotives ===
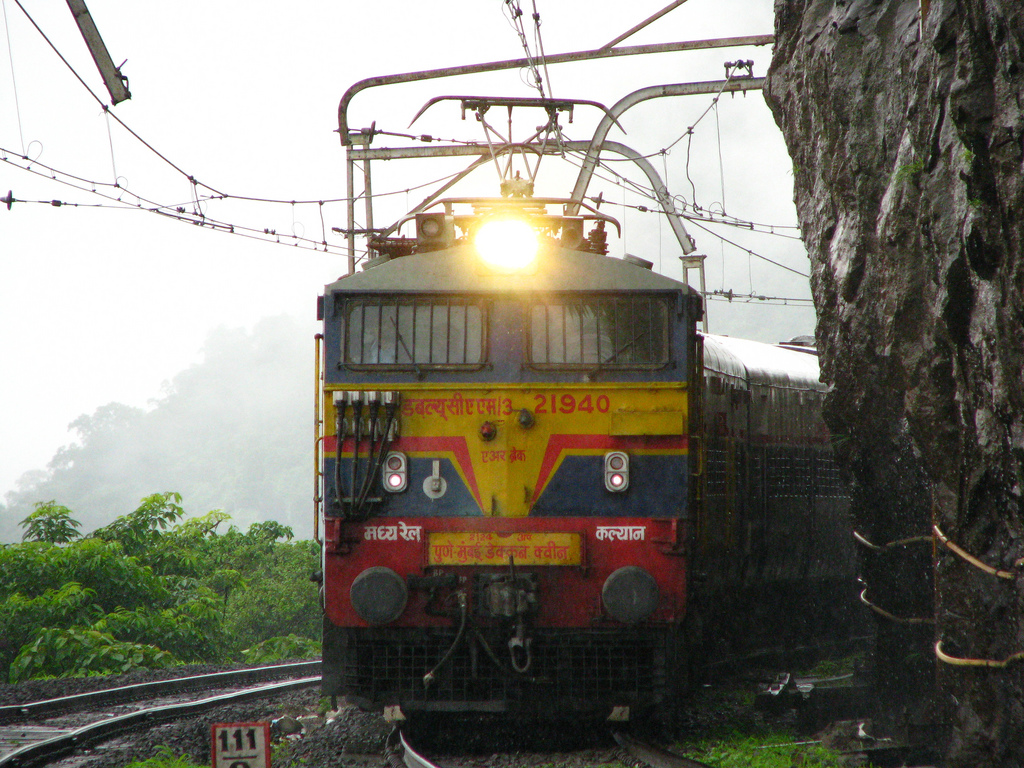
WCAM-3 locomotive hauling old coaches; 2008

The Deccan Queen has the distinction of being among the earliest intercity passenger trains in India to be hauled by an electric locomotive. It also became one of the first trains to operate through Bhor Ghat without using the reversing station, which was abandoned in 1929 following electrification of the route and the construction of new tunnels.

When introduced in 1930, the train was hauled by WCP-1 DC passenger locomotives. From the 1950s onwards, it was operated using WCM-series DC mixed-traffic locomotives, including the WCM-1, WCM-2, WCM-4 and WCM-5. These were subsequently replaced by other locomotive classes, including WCG-2 and dual-voltage WCAM-series locomotives. From the late 1990s, the Deccan Queen was regularly hauled by WCAM-2/2P and WCAM-3 locomotives based at Kalyan shed. WAP-7 locomotives were also occasionally used on the service from 2018 onwards.

On 18 April 2025, due to a shortage of electric locomotives and the ageing of WCAM-3 locomotives, the Deccan Queen was temporarily switched to diesel haulage using a WDP-4D locomotive. The arrangement was initially expected to continue until September 2025, when additional electric locomotives were anticipated to become available. However, on 30 April 2025, Central Railway reinstated electric traction on the service, and the Pune-Mumbai Deccan Queen was hauled by a WAP-4 electric locomotive. The decision followed an order issued by the General Manager of Central Railway as part of the zone's electrification centenary celebrations.

On the Bhor Ghat section between Karjat and Lonavala, additional locomotives are attached to the rear of trains to provide the extra power needed to climb the steep gradient. WCG-1 locomotives were used as bankers before being replaced by WCG-2 locomotives. The WCG-2 locomotives continued to perform banking duties until 2 May 2010, when the Bhor Ghat section was converted from 1,500 V DC to 25 kV AC traction.

== Sister trains ==
- Dedicated Mumbai-Pune Intercity trains:

Via Kalyan	Via Panvel	Defunct
Deccan Express	Pragati Express	Pune Mail
Mumbai–Pune Intercity Express	Pragati Express	Mumbai–Pune Shatabdi Express
Indrayani Express	Pragati Express	Mumbai-Pune Passenger
Sinhagad Express	Pragati Express	Pune-Mumbai Passenger
	Pragati Express	Mumbai-Pune Janta Express
	Pragati Express	Bombay-Poona Express

== See also ==
- Flying Ranee
- Flying Mail
