= Pune–Ajni Humsafar Express =

Pune - Ajni Humsafar Express

Overview
- Service type: Humsafar Express
- First service: 16 February 2019; 6 years ago
- Current operator: Central Railways

Route
- Termini: Pune (PUNE); Ajni (AJNI)
- Stops: 7
- Distance travelled: 887 km (551 mi)
- Average journey time: 15h 30m
- Service frequency: Weekly (Note: Runs one days in a week for every direction.)
- Train number: 22139 / 22140

On-board services
- Class: AC 3 tier
- Seating arrangements: Yes
- Sleeping arrangements: Yes
- Catering facilities: Available
- Observation facilities: Large windows

Technical
- Rolling stock: LHB Humsafar
- Track gauge: 1,676 mm (5 ft 6 in)
- Operating speed: 56 km/h (35 mph) Avg. Speed

The 22139 / 22140 Pune - Ajni Humsafar Express is a superfast train belonging to Central Railway zone that runs between Pune Junction and Ajni of Nagpur city.

It is currently being operated with 22139/22140 train numbers on a weekly basis.

== Coach composition ==
The trains is completely 3-tier AC sleeper trains designed by Indian Railways with features of LED screen display to show information about stations, train speed etc. and will have announcement system as well, Vending machines for tea, coffee and milk, Bio toilets in compartments as well as CCTV cameras.

== Service ==
The 22139/Pune - Ajni Humsafar Express has an average speed of 58 km/h and covers 887 km in 14h 50m.

The 22140/Ajni - Pune Humsafar Express has an average speed of 56 km/h and covers 887 km in 15h 35m.

== Route and halts ==
- Pune Junction
- Daund Chord Line
- Manmad
- Chalisgaon Junction
- Bhusaval Junction
- Akola
- Badnera
- Wardha
- Ajni

== Schedule ==
| Train Number | Station Code | Departure Station | Departure Time | Departure Day | Arrival Station | Arrival Time | Arrival Day |
|---|---|---|---|---|---|---|---|
| 22139 | PUNE | Pune Junction | 22:00 PM | Sat | Ajni | 13:15 PM | Sun |
| 22140 | AJNI | Ajni | 19:50 PM | Sun | Pune Junction | 11:45 AM | Mon |

== Traction ==
Both trains are hauled by Ajni based WAP 7 (HOG) equipped locomotive on its entire journey.

== Rake sharing ==
The train shares its rake with 22141/22142 Pune-Nagpur Humsafar Express.

== See also ==
- Humsafar Express
- Pune Junction railway station
- Ajni railway station
