= Pune–Nagpur Humsafar Express =

Pune - Nagpur Humsafar Express

Overview
- Service type: Humsafar Express
- First service: 3 March 2019; 6 years ago
- Current operator: Central Railways

Route
- Termini: Pune (PUNE); Nagpur (NGP)
- Stops: 7
- Distance travelled: 890 km (553 mi)
- Average journey time: 15h 30m
- Service frequency: Weekly (Note: Runs one days in a week for every direction.)
- Train number: 22141 / 22142

On-board services
- Class: AC 3 tier
- Seating arrangements: Yes
- Sleeping arrangements: Yes
- Catering facilities: Available
- Observation facilities: Large windows

Technical
- Rolling stock: LHB Humsafar
- Track gauge: 1,676 mm (5 ft 6 in)
- Operating speed: 57 km/h (35 mph) Avg. Speed

The 22141 / 22142 Pune - Nagpur Humsafar Express is a superfast train belonging to Central Railway zone that runs between Pune Junction and Nagpur Junction.

It is currently being operated with 22141/22142 train numbers on a weekly basis.

== Coach composition ==
The trains is completely 3-tier AC sleeper trains designed by Indian Railways with features of LED screen display to show information about stations, train speed etc. and will have announcement system as well, Vending machines for tea, coffee and milk, Bio toilets in compartments as well as CCTV cameras.

== Service ==
The 22141/Pune - Nagpur Humsafar Express has an average speed of 57 km/h and covers 890 km in 15h 30m.

The 22142/Nagpur - Pune Humsafar Express has an average speed of 52 km/h and covers 890 km in 17h 05m.

== Route and halts ==
- Pune
- Daund Chord Line
- Manmad
- Chalisgaon Junction
- Bhusaval Junction
- Shegaon
- Akola
- Badnera
- Wardha
- Nagpur

== Schedule ==
Train Number	Station Code	Departure Station	Departure Time	Departure Day	Arrival Station	Arrival Time	Arrival Day
22141	PUNE	Pune Junction	22:00 PM	Thu	Nagpur Junction	13:30 PM	Fri
22142	NGP	Nagpur Junction	15:00 PM	Fri	Pune Junction	08:05 AM	Sat

== Traction ==
It is hauled by an Ajni based WAP 7 (HOG) equipped locomotive from end to end.

== Rake sharing ==
The train shares its rake with 22139/22140 Pune-Ajni Humsafar Express.

== See also ==
- Humsafar Express
- Pune Junction railway station
- Nagpur Junction railway station
