= Mumbai CSMT–Amravati Superfast Express =

Train in India

Mumbai Amravati Express
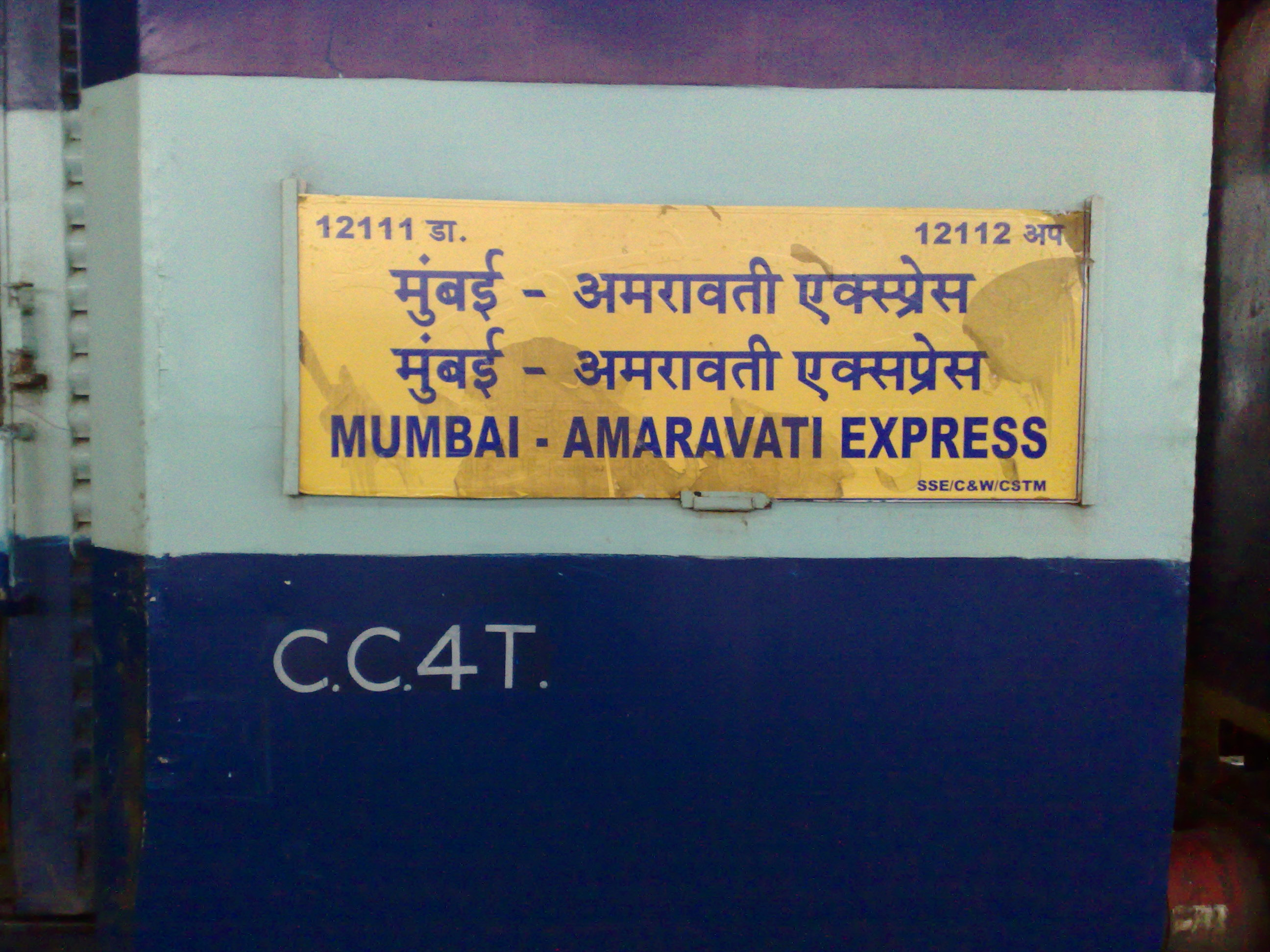

Overview
- Service type: Superfast Express
- Locale: Maharashtra
- First service: September 7, 2008; 17 years ago
- Current operator: Central Railway

Route
- Termini: Mumbai; Amravati
- Stops: 16
- Distance travelled: 672 km (418 mi)
- Average journey time: 12 hours (Approx.)
- Service frequency: Daily
- Train number: 12111 / 12112

On-board services
- Classes: AC 1st Class, AC 2 Tier, AC 3 Tier, Sleeper Class, General Unreserved
- Seating arrangements: Yes
- Sleeping arrangements: Yes
- Catering facilities: No Pantry Car
- Observation facilities: No Rake Sharing

Technical
- Rolling stock: LHB coach
- Track gauge: 1,676 mm (5 ft 6 in)
- Operating speed: 57.19 km/h (36 mph)

The 12111/12112 Amravati Express is a Superfast Express train belonging to Indian Railways that runs between Mumbai CSMT and Amravati Terminus in India. It is a daily service. It operates as train number 12111 from Mumbai to Amravati and as train number 12112 in the reverse direction. This train was introduced on 7 September 2008.

== Coaches ==
12111/12112 Amravati Express presently has 1 AC 1st Class cum AC 2 tier, 2 AC 2 tier, 4 AC 3 tier, 8 Sleeper Class, 3 General Unreserved and 1 SLR (Seating Cum Luggage Van) coache and 1 EOG.

Loco	1	2	3	4	5	6	7	8	9	10	11	12	13	14	15	16	17	18	19	20	
	SLRD	GS	S8	S7	S6	S5	S4	S3	S2	S1	B4	B3	B2	B1	A3	A2	A1	HA1	GS	GS	GV1

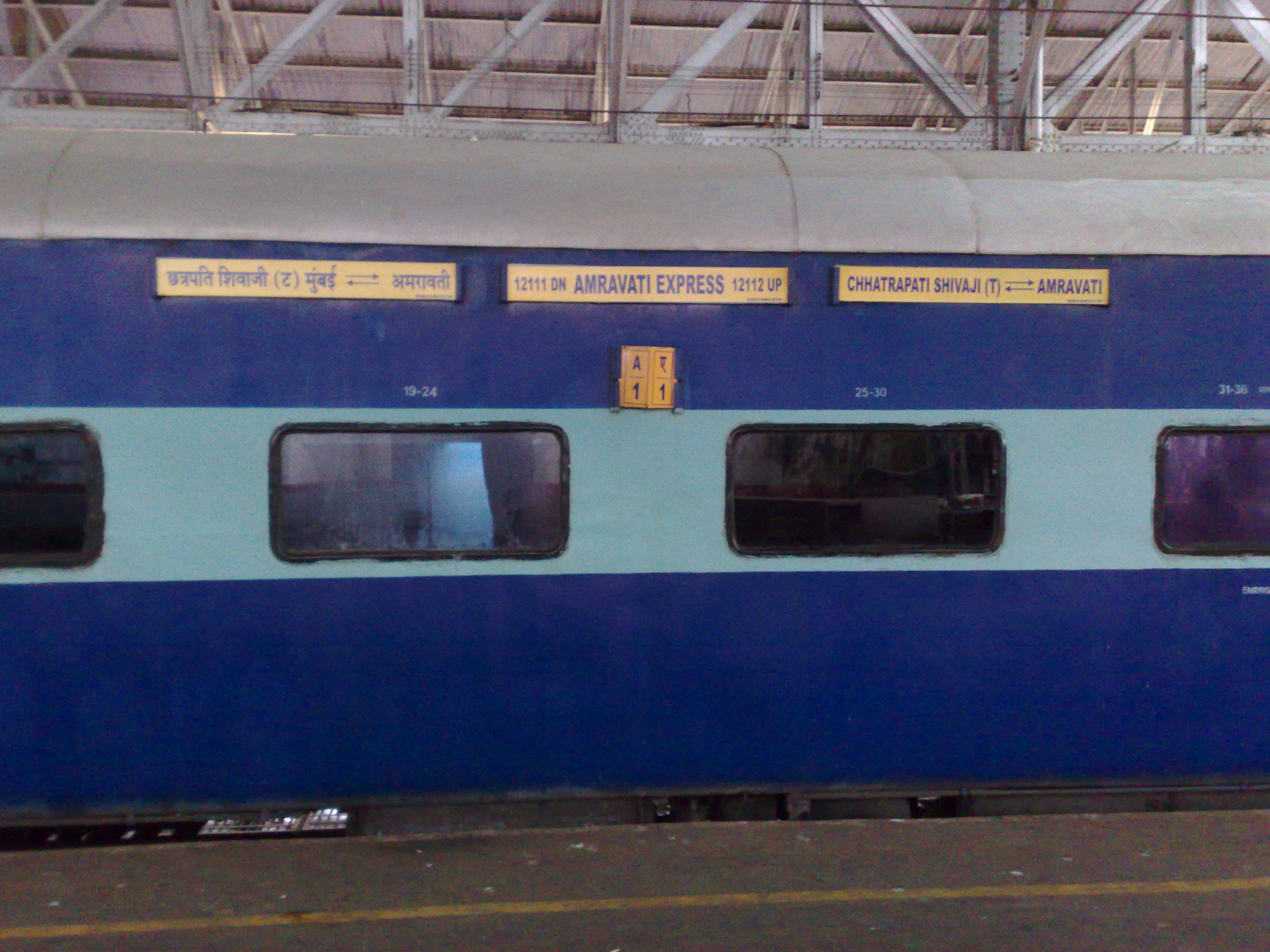
12111 Amravati Express – AC 2 tier coach

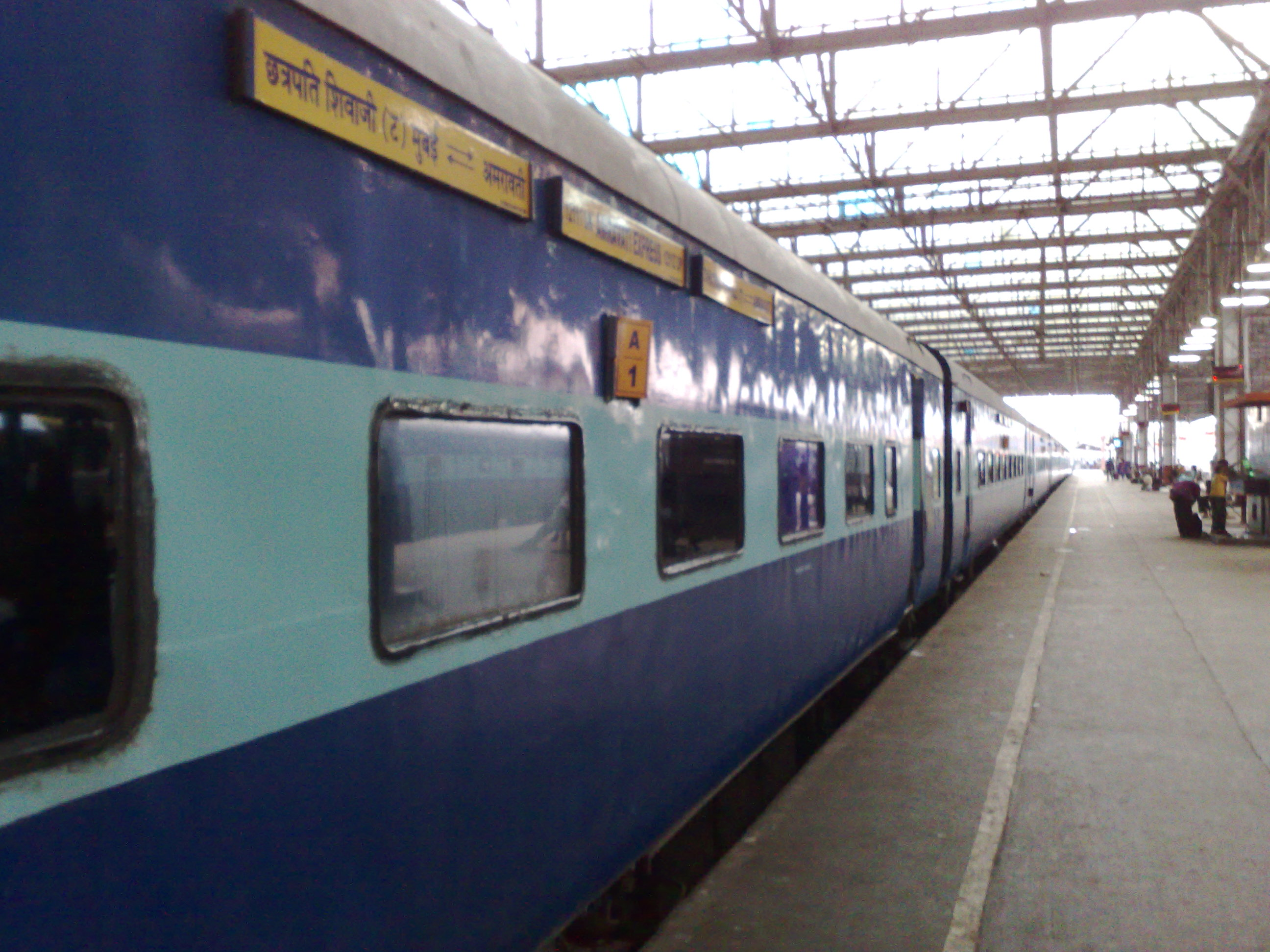
12111 Amravati Express at Mumbai CST
