= Amravati–Jabalpur Superfast Express =

Train in India

Jabalpur–Amravati Superfast Express
Overview
- Service type: Superfast
- Locale: Madhya Pradesh & Maharashtra
- Current operator: West Central Railway

Route
- Termini: Jabalpur (JBP); Amravati (AMI)
- Stops: 20
- Distance travelled: 752 km (467 mi)
- Average journey time: 13 hours 5 minutes
- Service frequency: Daily
- Train number: 12159 / 12160

On-board services
- Classes: AC 2 Tier, AC 3 Tier, Sleeper Class, General Unreserved
- Seating arrangements: Yes
- Sleeping arrangements: Yes
- Catering facilities: Available
- Observation facilities: Large windows
- Baggage facilities: Available
- Other facilities: Below the seats

Technical
- Rolling stock: LHB coach
- Track gauge: Broad Gauge
- Operating speed: 56 km/h (35 mph) average including halts.

The 12159 / 12160 Jabalpur–Amravati Superfast Express is a superfast express train of Indian Railways. It runs between Jabalpur Junction railway station of Jabalpur, the major tourist city of Central Indian state, Madhya Pradesh and Amravati railway station of Maharashtra, India. The train is India's 10th ISO Certified train. Train runs daily with high speed and secure LHB coach.

From June 2025, the train halt/termination was at Wardha instead of Amravati due to NI works.

== Coach composition ==
The train consists of 22 LHB coaches:

- 1 AC I Tier
- 2 AC II Tier
- 6 AC III Tier
- 7 Sleeper coaches
- 4 Unreserved
- 2 SLR/Generator Car (EoG).

== Average speed and frequency ==
The train runs with an average speed of 51 km/h. The train runs on daily basis from both the sites.

== Traction ==
Both trains are hauled by an Itarsi Loco Shed or Tughlakabad Loco Shed-based WAP-7 electric locomotive from Jabalpur to Amravati and vice versa.

== Rake maintenance ==
The train is maintained by the Jabalpur coaching depot.

== See also ==
- Mahakoshal Express
- Indore Junction
- Bhopal Junction
