= Amravati–Ajni Intercity Express =

Express train in India

Amravati - Ajni Intercity Express
Overview
- Service type: Express
- First service: 8 September 2008; 17 years ago
- Current operator: Central Railway zone

Route
- Termini: Amravati; Ajni
- Stops: 3
- Distance travelled: 178 km (111 mi)
- Average journey time: 3 hours 17 mins
- Service frequency: Daily (Except Sat)
- Train number: 12119 / 12120

On-board services
- Class: general unreserved
- Seating arrangements: Yes
- Sleeping arrangements: Yes
- Catering facilities: No

Technical
- Rolling stock: Standard Indian Railways Coaches
- Track gauge: 1,676 mm (5 ft 6 in)
- Operating speed: 32.5 km/h (20 mph)

The 12119 / 20 Amravati - Ajni Intercity Express is an Express train belonging to Indian Railways Central Railway zone that runs between Amravati and Ajni in India.

It operates as train number 12119 from Amravati to Ajni and as train number 12120 in the reverse direction serving the states of Maharashtra.

== Coaches ==
The 12119 / 20 Amravati Ajni Intercity Express has nine general unreserved & two SLR (seating with luggage rake) coaches . It does not carry a pantry car coach.

As is customary with most train services in India, coach composition may be amended at the discretion of Indian Railways depending on demand.

In June 2023, the rakes were converted into MEMU (Mainline Electric Multiple Units).

== Service ==
The 12119 Amravati - Ajni Intercity Express covers the distance of 178 km (111 mi) in 2 hours 45 mins (65 km/h) and in 3 hours 10 mins as the 12120 Ajni - Amravati Intercity Express (56 km/h).

As the average speed of the train is lower than 55 km/h (34 mph), as per railway rules, its fare doesn't includes a Superfast surcharge.

== Routing ==
The 12119 / 20 Intercity Express runs from Amravati via chandur, Dhamangaon, Pulgaon, Wardha Junction to Ajni.

== Traction ==
As the route is electrified, a Kalyan Loco Shed based WCAM 3 electric locomotive pulls the train to its destination.
