= Hutatma Express =

Train in India

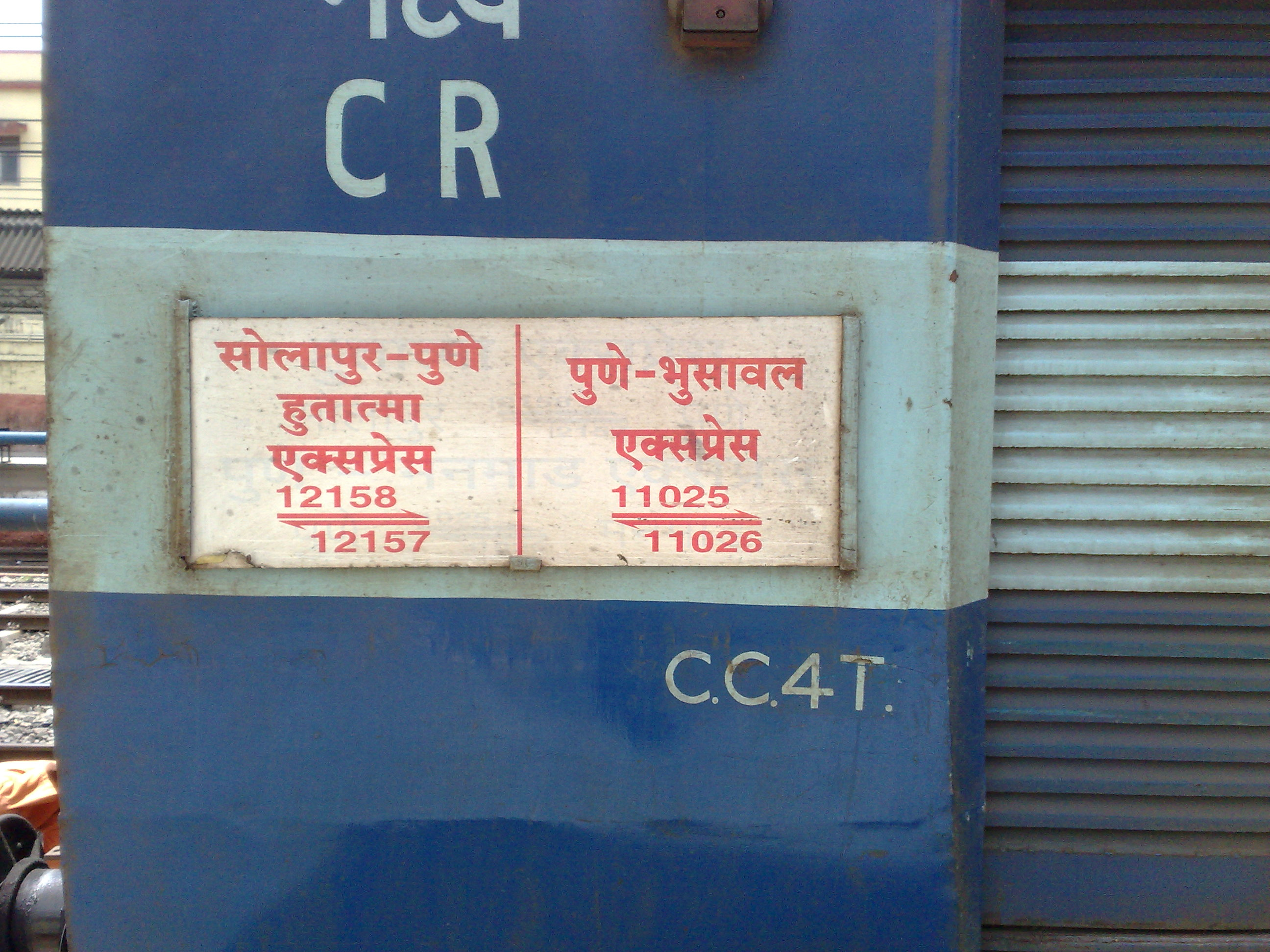

Overview
- Service type: Superfast
- Locale: Maharashtra
- First service: 15 July 2000; 25 years ago
- Current operator: Central Railway

Route
- Termini: Pune (PUNE); Solapur (SUR)
- Stops: 4
- Distance travelled: 264 km (164 mi)
- Average journey time: 4 hours 00 minutes
- Service frequency: DAILY
- Train number: 12157 / 12158

On-board services
- Classes: AC Chair Car, Second Class Seating, General Unreserved
- Seating arrangements: Yes
- Sleeping arrangements: No
- Catering facilities: No pantry car attached but available
- Observation facilities: Rake sharing with 11025/11026 Pune–Amravati Express

Technical
- Rolling stock: LHB coach
- Track gauge: 1,676 mm (5 ft 6 in)
- Operating speed: 130 km/h (81 mph) maximum 66.00 km/h (41 mph), including halts

The 12157 / 12158 Hutatma Express is a Superfast Express train belonging to Indian Railways – Central Railways Zone that runs between Pune Junction and Solapur Junction in India.

It operates as train number 12157 from Pune Junction to Solapur Junction and as train number 12158 in the reverse direction.

It is one of two dedicated Intercity Trains between Pune the discretion of Indian Railways depending on demand.

== Service ==
The 12157/58 Pune–Solapur Hutatma Express covers a distance of 264 kilometers in 4 hours 00 mins (66.00 km/h) in both directions.

As the average speed of the train is above 55 km/h, as per Indian Railways rules, its fare includes a Superfast surcharge.

== Routeing ==
The 12157/58 Pune–Solapur Hutatma Express runs via Daund Junction, Kurduvadi to Solapur Junction.

== Traction ==
Electric loco - KYN based WCAM3 Or WCAM2P had been allotted to haul the 12157/58 Hutatma Express but due to a shortage of locomotives in the central railways, it has been allotted a Pune-based WDP4d diesel locomotive

== Time table ==
- 12158 Solapur–Pune Hutatma Express leaves Solapur Junction on a daily basis at 06:30 hrs IST and reaches Pune Junction at 10:30 hrs IST the same day.
- 12157 Pune–Solapur Hutatma Express leaves Pune Junction on a daily basis at 17:50 hrs IST and reaches Solapur Junction at 21:30 hrs IST the same day.

== See also ==
- Pune–Bhusaval Express
- Pune–Solapur Intercity Express
