= Amravati railway station =

Railway station in Maharashtra, India

Amravati

General information
- Location: Amravati, Maharashtra; India
- Coordinates: 20°55′53″N 77°45′30″E
- Elevation: 342 metres (1,122 ft)
- System: Indian Railways station
- Owner: Indian Railways
- Operator: Central Railways
- Line: Nagpur–Bhusawal section of Howrah–Nagpur–Mumbai line
- Platforms: 4
- Tracks: 5

Construction
- Structure type: Standard, at ground
- Parking: Available

Other information
- Station code: AMI
- Zone(s): Central Railway zone
- Division(s): Nagpur CR railway division

History
- Opened: 1867
- Electrified: 1993–94
- Former names: Great Indian Peninsula Railway
Route map
- Source:Google maps, 61105 Badnera-Narkhed Memu
Location
- Location within Maharashtra Location within India

Amravati railway station serves Amravati in Amravati district in the Indian state of Maharashtra. It is linked to Badnera railway station on the Howrah–Nagpur–Mumbai line. This is a terminal station. Train for Mumbai, Pune, Tirupati, Jabalpur, Surat, Nagpur originates from Amravati. It is one of the three railway stations of Amravati city.

== History ==
The first train in India travelled from Mumbai to Thane on 16 April 1853. By May 1854, Great Indian Peninsula Railway's Bombay–Thane line was extended to Kalyan. Bhusawal railway station was set up in 1860 and in 1867 the GIPR branch line was extended to Nagpur.

The 138 kilometres (86 mi)-long 5 ft 6 in (1,676 mm) broad gauge Badnera–Narkhed line was completed in 2012. New Amravati railway station is on the new track.

=== Electrification ===
Railways in the Amravati area were electrified in 1993–94. The 2 km-long Amravati chord line was electrified in 2011–2012.

== Amenities ==
Amravati railway station has total 4 platforms. Amenities at Amravati railway station include: computerised reservation office and waiting room.

== Trains ==
Important trains departing Amravati Terminal:

=== Express ===
- 22118/22117 Pune–Amravati AC Superfast Express
- 12112/12111 Mumbai CSMT–Amravati Superfast Express
- 12766/12765 Tirupati–Amravati Express
- 29026/29025 Surat–Amravati Express
- 12119/12120 Amravati–Ajni Intercity Express
- 12160/12159 Amravati–Jabalpur Superfast Express
- 11025/11026 Pune–Amravati Express
- 11405/11406 Pune–Bhusaval Express

=== Passenger ===
- Badnera–Amravati Shuttle.
- Amravati–Wardha Passenger.
- Nagpur–Amravati Passenger.

Preceding station	Indian Railways	Following station
Badnera towards ?	Central Railway zone Badnera–Amravati link line	Terminus
