= Flying Mail =

Defunct passenger train in India

Overview
- Service type: Superfast mail train
- Locale: Punjab, Sindh (before partition of India); Haryana, NCT Delhi, Punjab, India (after partition of India)
- First service: 16 April 1853
- Last service: 16 April 2002
- Current operator: Northern Railway

Route
- Termini: Delhi; Karachi Cantonment (before partition of India); Amritsar (after partition of India)
- Distance travelled: 192.2 km (119.4 mi)
- Average journey time: 9 hours

Technical
- Track gauge: 1,676 mm (5 ft 6 in)

The Flying Mail was a passenger train in India that operated between Delhi and Amritsar, and prior to the Partition of India, between Delhi and Karachi. The service began in 1853 and was discontinued in 2001. Before the partition, the Flying Mail ran from Karachi (now in Pakistan) to Delhi via Lahore and was the fastest train between the two cities. Prior to partition, the southbound train departed Delhi at noon and reached Lahore at 9:00 pm before continuing to Karachi; on the return journey from Karachi, it arrived at Lahore at noon and reached Delhi at 9:00 pm.

Following partition, the train shared its rake with the Sarayu Yamuna Express between Delhi and Amritsar until 2001, when the Sarayu Yamuna Express was renamed the Shaheed Express and extended to Amritsar (operating four days a week between Amritsar and Jainagar in Bihar).
