= Pune–Supaul Superfast Express =

Train in India

Pune–Danapur Superfast Express
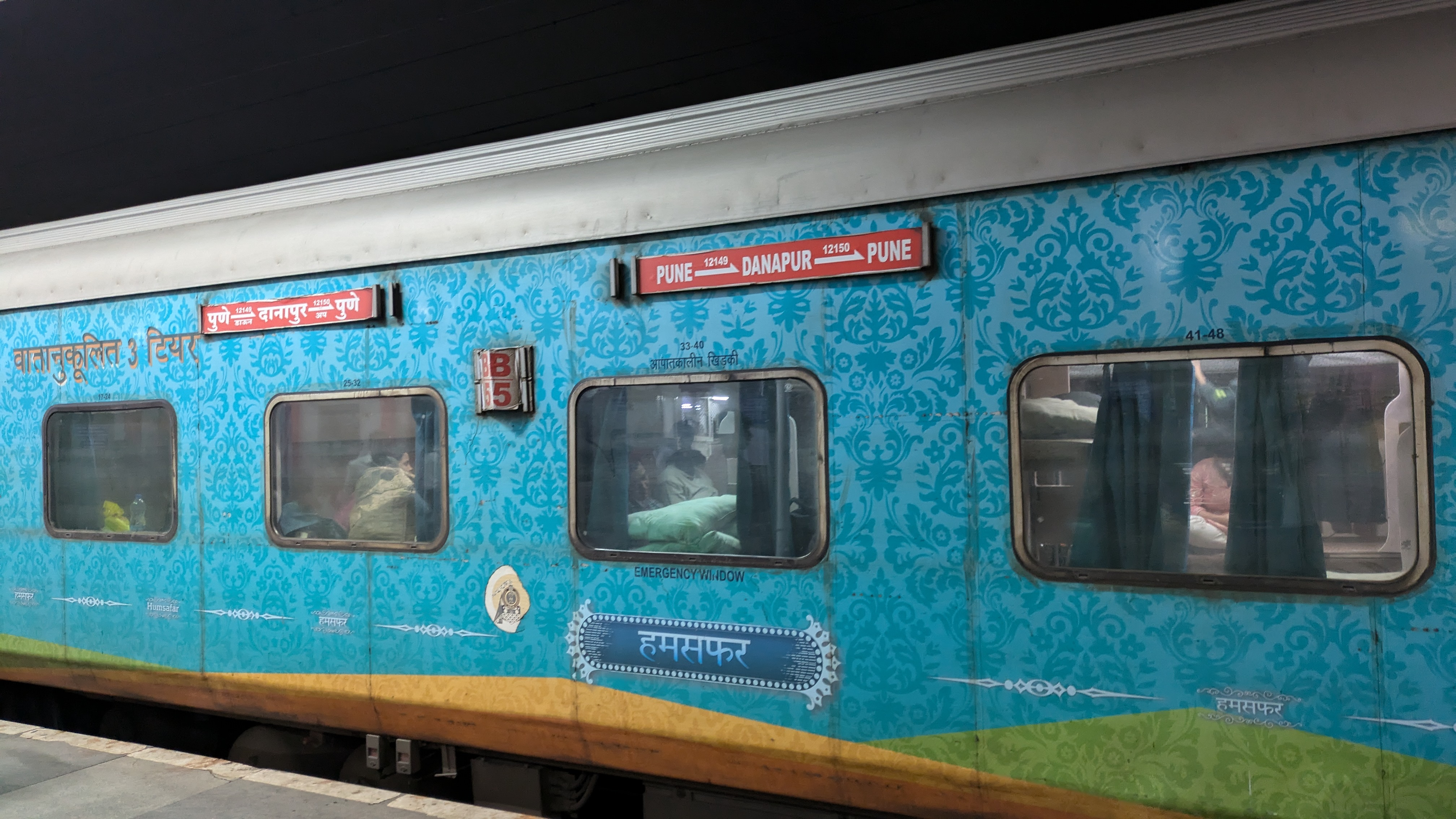
- Primary maintenance - Pune with Rbpc

Overview
- Service type: Express
- First service: 29 August 2003; 22 years ago
- Current operator: Central Railway

Route
- Termini: Pune (PUNE); Supaul (SOU)
- Stops: 17
- Distance travelled: 1,996 km (1,240 mi)
- Average journey time: 37 hours 30 minutes
- Service frequency: Daily
- Train number: 11401 / 11402

On-board services
- Classes: AC 2 Tier, AC 3 Tier, Sleeper Class, General Unreserved
- Seating arrangements: No
- Sleeping arrangements: Yes
- Catering facilities: Available
- Observation facilities: Large windows
- Baggage facilities: No
- Other facilities: Below the seats

Technical
- Rolling stock: LHB coach
- Track gauge: 1,676 mm (5 ft 6 in)
- Operating speed: 58 km/h (36 mph) average including halts.

The 11401 / 11402 Pune–Supaul is a Express train of the Indian Railways connecting Pune Junction in Maharashtra and Supaul of Bihar.

Previously, this train used to run between Danapur and Pune, but on 12th September 2025, the railway extended it up to Supaul Railway Station.

== Route and halts ==
Code	Station name
SOU	Supaul
GEB	Garh Baruari
SHC	Saharsa Jn
SBV	Simri Bakhtiyarpur
MNE	Mansi Jn
KGG	Khagaria Jn
BGS	Begusarai
BJU	Barauni Jn
SPP	Shahpur Patoree
HJP	Hajipur Jn
SEE	Sonpur Jn
PPTA	Patliputra Jn
DNR	Danapur
ARA	Ara Jn
BXR	Buxar
DDU	Pt DD Upadhyaya Jn
MZP	Mirzapur
PCOI	Prayagraj Chheoki Jn
STA	Satna Jn
MYR	Maihar
KTE	Katni Jn
JBP	Jabalpur
ET	Itarsi Jn
KKN	Khirkiya
KNW	Khandwa Jn
BAU	Burhanpur
BSL	Bhusaval Jn
MMR	Manmad Jn
KPG	Kopargaon
BAP	Belapur
ANG	Ahilyanagar Jn
DDCC	Daund Chord Line
PUNE	Pune Jn

== Coach Composition ==
Type of coach	Number of coaches
AC II Tier	2
AC III Tier	7
Sleeper Coaches	6
General	3
Pantry Car	1
Second-class Luggage/parcel van	2
Total	21

== Traction ==
As the route is yet fully electrified, it is hauled by a Pune Diesel Loco Shed based WAP4 locomotive from Pune to Danapur.

== Direction reversal ==
Earlier it used to reverse its direction at Daund Junction but after the opening of Daund Chord line it passes without rake reversal.

== See also ==
- Pune–Darbhanga Gyan Ganga Express
- Muzaffarpur - Hadapsar (Pune) AC Express
- SSS Hubballi - Muzaffarpur Special
