= Pune–Darbhanga Gyan Ganga Express =

Train in India

Overview
- Service type: Express
- Locale: Bihar, Uttar Pradesh, Madhya Pradesh & Maharashtra
- Current operator: Central Railway

Route
- Termini: Pune (PUNE); Darbhanga (DBG)
- Stops: 28
- Distance travelled: 1,949 km (1,211 mi)
- Average journey time: 38 hours 30 minutes
- Service frequency: Weekly
- Train number: 11033 / 11034

On-board services
- Classes: AC 2 Tier, AC 3 Tier, Sleeper Class, General Unreserved
- Seating arrangements: Yes
- Sleeping arrangements: Yes
- Catering facilities: Available
- Observation facilities: Large windows
- Baggage facilities: Available
- Other facilities: Below the seats

Technical
- Rolling stock: LHB coach
- Track gauge: 1,676 mm (5 ft 6 in)
- Operating speed: 50 km/h (31 mph) average including halts

The 11033 / 11034 Pune–Darbhanga Gyan Ganga Express is an express that runs between Pune and Darbhanga. It is a weekly train that completes its journey of 1,949 kilometres (1,211 mi) in 38 hours 30 minutes. It runs at a Peak speed of 96 kilometres per hour (60 mph).

== Routing ==
The train runs from Pune via Daund Junction, Manmad, Bhusaval, Itarsi Junction, Jabalpur Junction, Katni Junction, Satna, Prayagraj Junction, Manduadih, Varanasi, Aunrihar Junction, Ghazipur City, Ballia, Chhapra Junction, Hajipur, Muzaffarpur Junction, Samastipur to Darbhanga.

== Traction ==
The train is hauled by a Howda-based WAP-4 electric locomotive so was WAP-7 from Pune to Darbhanga and vice versa.

== Direction reversal ==
The train reverses its direction 3 times at;

- Daund Junction
- Prayagraj Junction
- Samastipur Junction.

== Rake sharing ==
The train shares its rake with;

1. 11097/11098 Poorna Express
2. 22149/22150 Pune–Ernakulam Express.

== Time table ==
Train numbers are 11033 from Pune to Darbhanga 11034 from Darbhanga to Pune
