= Pune Junction railway station =

Railway station in Maharashtra, India

Pune Junction पुणे जंक्शन
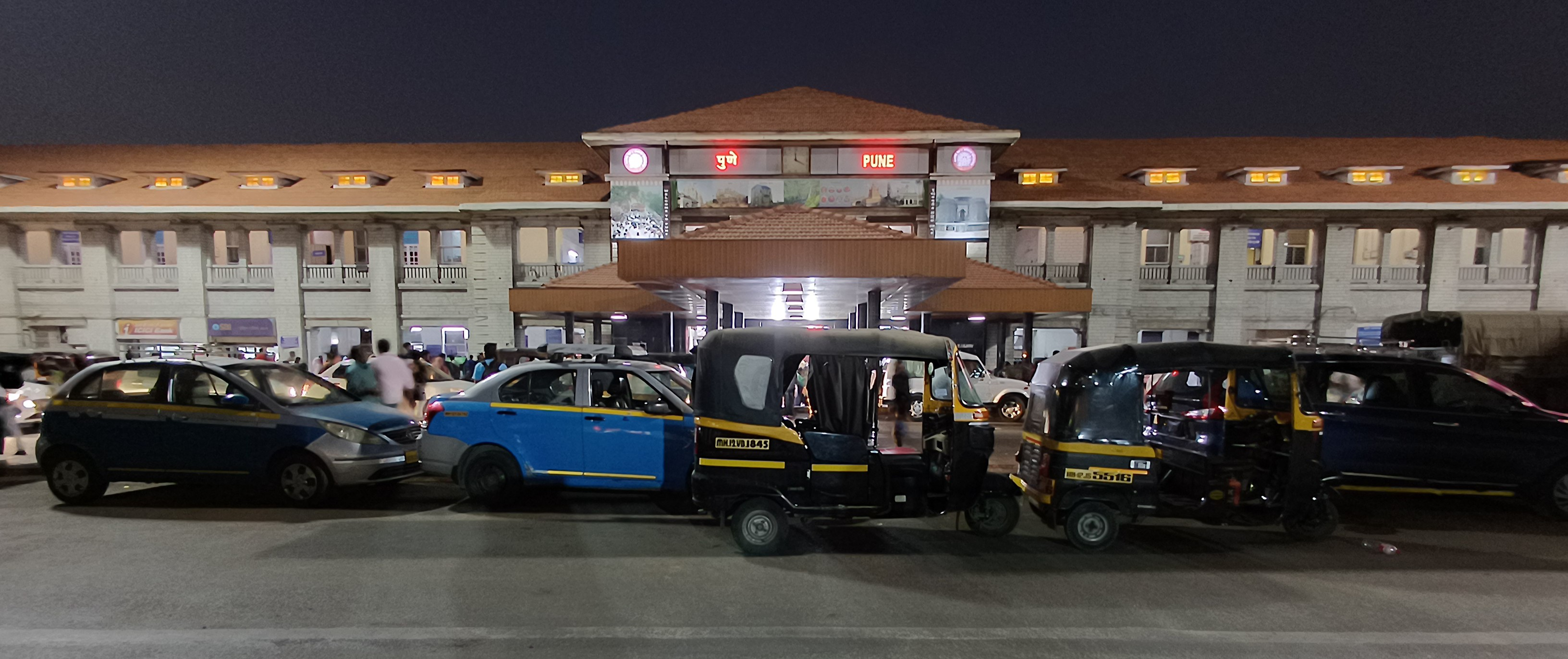
- Pune Junction

General information
- Location: HH Prince Aga Khan Road, Agarkar Nagar
- Coordinates: 18°31′44″N 73°52′27″E
- Elevation: 560 metres (1,840 ft)
- System: Indian Railways; Pune Suburban Railway
- Owner: Indian Railways
- Lines: Mumbai–Chennai line; Pune–Miraj–Londa line
- Platforms: 6
- Tracks: 12
- Connections: Pune Railway Station: Aqua Line

Construction
- Structure type: At-grade
- Parking: Yes
- Cycle facilities: Yes

Other information
- Station code: PUNE
- Zone(s): Central Railway zone
- Division(s): Pune

History
- Opened: 1858; 168 years ago
- Rebuilt: 27 July 1925; 101 years ago
- Electrified: 3 February 1925; 101 years ago

Passengers
- 2023-24: 22,256,812

Services
| Preceding station | Pune Suburban Railway | Following station |
|---|---|---|
| Shivaji Nagar towards Lonavala | Lonavala Line | Terminus |
| Preceding station | Pune Metro | Following station |
Out-of-system interchange
| Mangalwar Peth towards Vanaz | Aqua Line transfer at Pune Railway Station | Ruby Hall Clinic towards Ramwadi |
Location
- Location within Maharashtra Location within India
- Interactive map

Pune Junction railway station (station code: PUNE) is the main railway junction of the city of Pune, India. It is one of the major railway junctions in Maharashtra. Pune Junction consists of 6 platforms. It also has a suburban train network.

It has two accesses, from HH Aga Khan Road on the south and Raja Bahadur Mills Road on the north. Pune Police and Central Reserve Police Force serve the station.

== History ==
The first passenger train in India ran on 16 April 1853, on the track laid by the Great Indian Peninsula Railway from Chhatrapati Shivaji Maharaj Terminus in Mumbai to Thane. The GIPR line was extended to Kalyan Junction in 1854, then on the south-east side to Khopoli via Palasdhari at the foot of the Western Ghats in 1856. While construction work was in progress across the Bhor Ghat, the GIPR opened the Khandala–Pune Junction track to the public in 1858. The Pune railway station opened in 1858. The Bhor Ghat incline connecting Palasdari to Khandala was completed in 1862, thereby connecting Mumbai and Pune. The present Pune railway station building was built in 1925.

The Pune–Raichur sector of the Mumbai–Chennai line was opened in stages: the portion from Pune to Barshi Road was opened in 1859, from Barshi Road to Mohol in 1860 and from Mohol to Solapur also in 1860. Work on the line from Solapur southwards began in 1865, and the line was extended to Raichur in 1871.

The Southern Mahratta Railway (SMR) completed the metre-gauge Vasco–Guntakal railway line along with the branch from Londa to Pune via Miraj in 1890. The Pune–Londa main section was converted from metre-gauge to 5 ft 6 in (1,676 mm) broad gauge in 1971.

== Electrification ==
Railway electrification in India began with the first electric train, between Bombay Victoria Terminus and Kurla, by the GIPR on 3 February 1925, on 1.5 kV DC. The Kalyan–Pune section was electrified with a 1.5 kV DC overhead system in 1930.

The previously used 1.5 kV DC was converted to 25 kV AC on 5 May 2013 from Kalyan to Khopoli and Kalyan to Kasara. Conversion from 1.5 kV DC to 25 kV AC on the Lokmanya Tilak Terminus–Thane–Kalyan section was completed on 12 January 2014. The CSMT to LTT section was converted from 1.5 kV DC to 25 kV AC on 8 June 2015. The Kalyan–Pune section was also converted from 1.5 kV DC to 25 kV AC in 2010.

The Pune–Daund–Bhigwan section was electrified in 2017.

The Pune–Miraj section was electrified in 2022.

== Diesel Loco Shed, Pune ==
| SN | Locomotives | HP | Quantity |
|---|---|---|---|
| 1. | WDM 3A | 3100 | 2 |
| 2. | WDG-3A | 3100 | 20 |
| 3. | WDM-3D | 3300 | 19 |
| 4. | WDP-4D | 4500 | 26 |
| 5. | WDG-4/4D | 4000/4500 | 90 |
| 6. | WAP-7 | 6350 | 68 |
| 7. | WAG-9 | 6120 | 30 |
| Total locomotives active as of February 2026 | | | 255 |

== Infrastructure ==
This station has three footbridges with a skywalk. Elevator service is available on the footbridge. Plans are being made to upgrade the station to greater standards.

As a protection against the coronavirus, Central Railway's Railway Protection Force has deployed a robot, 'Captain Arjun', to screen patients and enhance security surveillance at the station. Its electronic eyes are useful for screening passengers during boarding. The robot will help protect passengers and rail staff from infection in addition to performing security maintenance. The robot is equipped with motion sensors, one pan-tilt-zoom camera and a dome camera, which uses artificial intelligence to track suspicious or anti-social mischief makers in the station. Recently, Indian Railways has also launched its first food truck at the Railway station. It is maintained by the Quick Service Restaurant brand Jumboking. In addition to this, there are 14 food stalls which are currently functional at the Pune Railway station as per IRSDC. These are located at different parts of the station and platforms. Other amenities in the station include waiting halls, dormitories, retiring rooms, cloak rooms, book stalls, health kiosks, pay and use toilets, SBI credit card kiosks, ATMs, water vending machines, pay and park and many others for the convenience of passengers. Facility management at the station is facilitated by The Indian Railway Stations Development Corporation Limited (IRSDC). As part of its modernisation and beautification of the station, IRSDC is taking various initiatives and measures to upgrade facilities in and around the railway station. Some of these are undertaken in collaboration with leading third-party vendors.

=== Maldhakka Goods Yard ===
Maldhakka is the freight depot of the Pune Railway Station and consists of two railway sheds. All freight trains are loaded and unloaded at this depot. The entrance to the goods yard is situated at Maldhakka Chowk.

=== Power ===
The station is powered by a solar power plant and emergency diesel generators. The 160 kWp solar power plant generates around 2.4 lakh units (kWh) annually. Funded by Persistent CSR, Sunshot built the plant in June 2016. This project was replicated for the Hyderabad Deccan railway station.

== Services ==
Pune railway station serves as a stop for southbound trains from Mumbai, Gujarat and Madhya Pradesh. It also serves as a stop for northbound trains from Goa and Karnataka. The station is a major hub for freight transportations

The following major trains start from Pune Junction railway station:

- 12149/50 Pune–Danapur Superfast Express
- 11033/34 Pune–Darbhanga Gyan Ganga Express
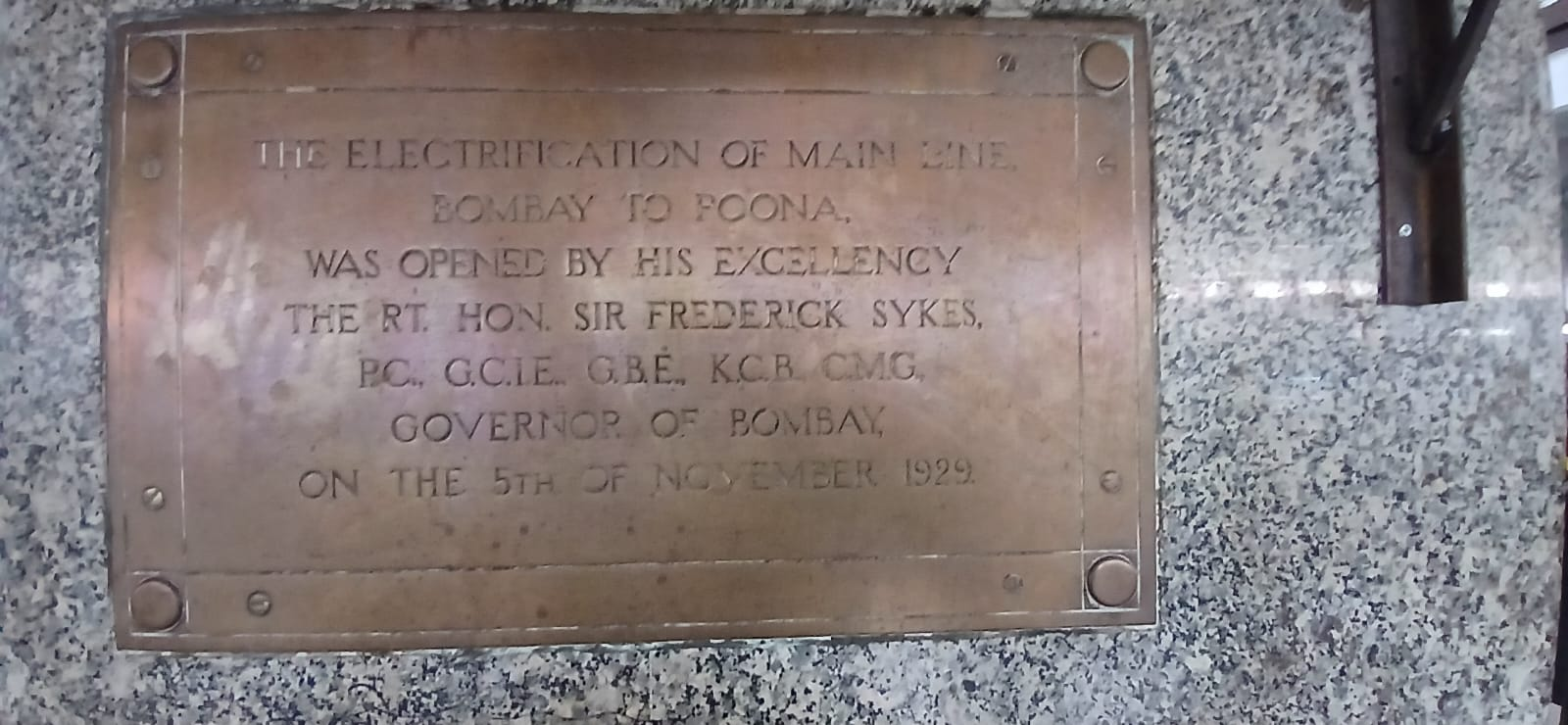
- Plaque commemorating the Electrification of the Bombay- Poona line, with 1.5kV DC traction, 1929
  11095/96 Ahimsa Express
- 12297/98 Ahmedabad–Pune Duronto Express
- 22185/86 Ahimsa Express
- 11007/08 Deccan Express
- 11009/10 Sinhagad Express
- 12123/24 Deccan Queen
- 12127/28 Mumbai–Pune Intercity Express
- 22105/06 Indrayani Express
- 12125/26 Pragati Express
- 12263/64 Hazrat Nizamuddin–Pune Duronto Express
- 12493/94 Darshan AC Express
- 12129/30 Azad Hind Express
- 12221/22 Pune–Howrah Duronto Express
- 20821/22 Santragachi–Pune Humsafar Express
- 11025/26 Pune–Secunderabad Shatabdi Express
- 17013/14 Hyderabad–Pune Express
- 11097/98 Poorna Express
- 22149/50 Pune–Ernakulam Express
- 16381/82 Kanyakumari–Pune Express
- 12113/14 Pune–Nagpur Garib Rath Express
- 12135/36 Pune–Nagpur Express
- 22123/24 Pune–Ajni AC Superfast Express
- 22139/40 Pune–Ajni Humsafar Express
- 11419/20 Pune–Nagpur Humsafar Express
- 11405/06 Pune–Amravati Express
- 22117/18 Pune–Amravati AC Superfast Express
- 12157/58 Hutatma Express
- 12169/70 Pune–Solapur Intercity Express
- 15589/90 Muzaffarpur - Hadapsar (Pune) AC Express

=== Suburban railway ===
The Pune Suburban Railway operates on a single route, Pune Junction to Lonavala and its part, Shivajinagar to Talegaon. There are 15 trains that operate on the Pune–Lonavala route and 3 trains that operate on the Shivajinagar–Talegaon route.

There are eight DEMU trains that operate between the Pune Junction and Daund station. This section is electrified and is planned to be included into suburban rail.

The chances of starting DEMU services between Pune and Ahmednagar stations are increased as 24 stations of Daund-Ankai section will be merged with the Pune Rail Division. Currently Daund-Ankai section is under Solapur Rail Division. Merging with Pune Division will increase the chances of starting DEMU services between Ahmednagar and Pune railway station.

== Future ==
There are plans to increase service in the Mumbai–Pune section, lay additional track between Pune and Lonavala, increase the budget for track surveys and construct separate terminals for suburban trains. There are also proposals to construct a new EMU terminal. It would be situated to the west of the existing station and have three lines and three platforms. The chances of starting demu services between pune and Ahmednagar stations are increased as 24 stations of daund-Ankai section will be merged with pune Railway division. Currently Daund-Ankai section is under solapur railway division. Merging with pune division will incarese the chances of starting demu services between Ahmednagar and pune railway station.

== Gallery ==
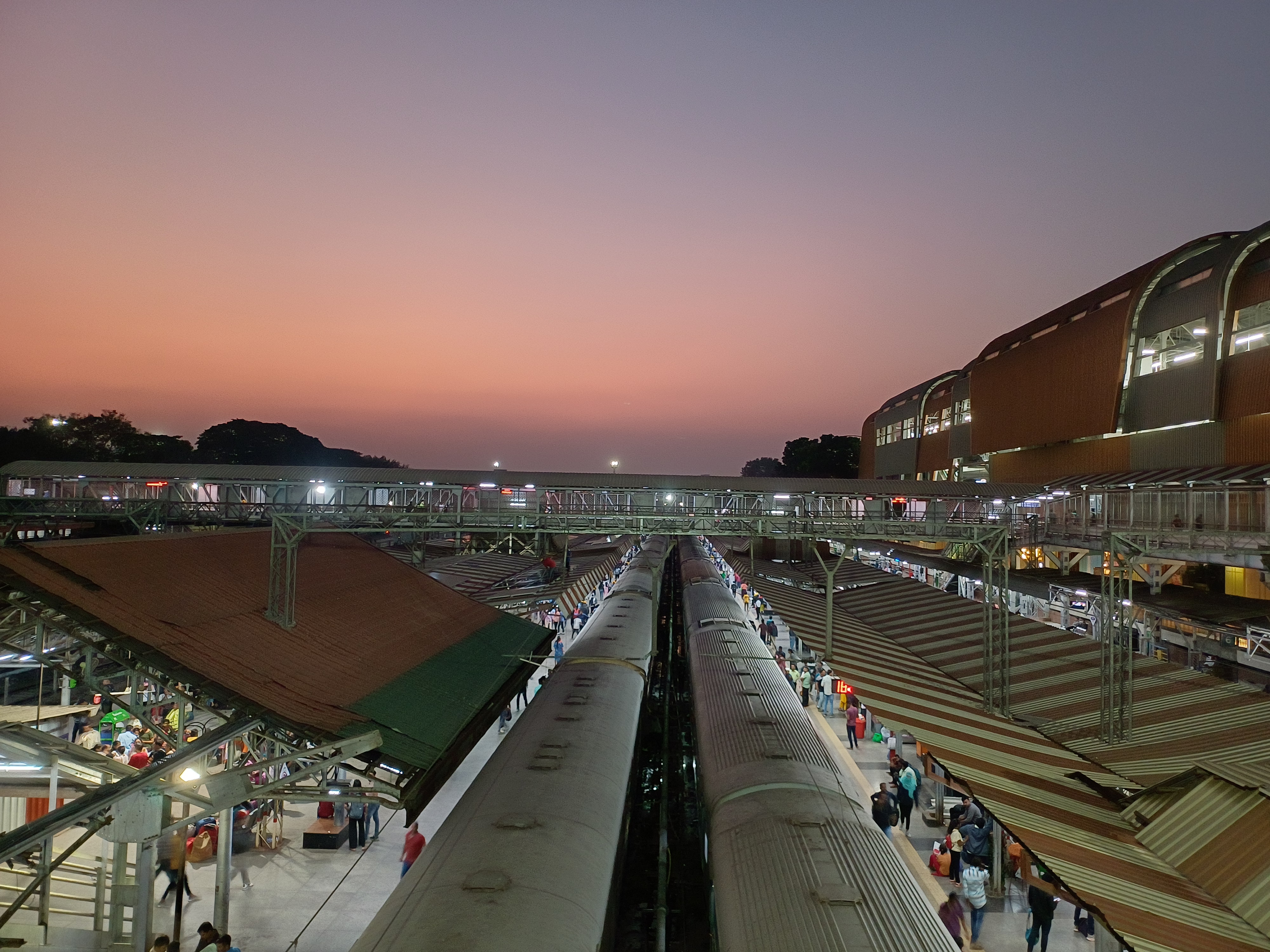
View of station from foot over bridge

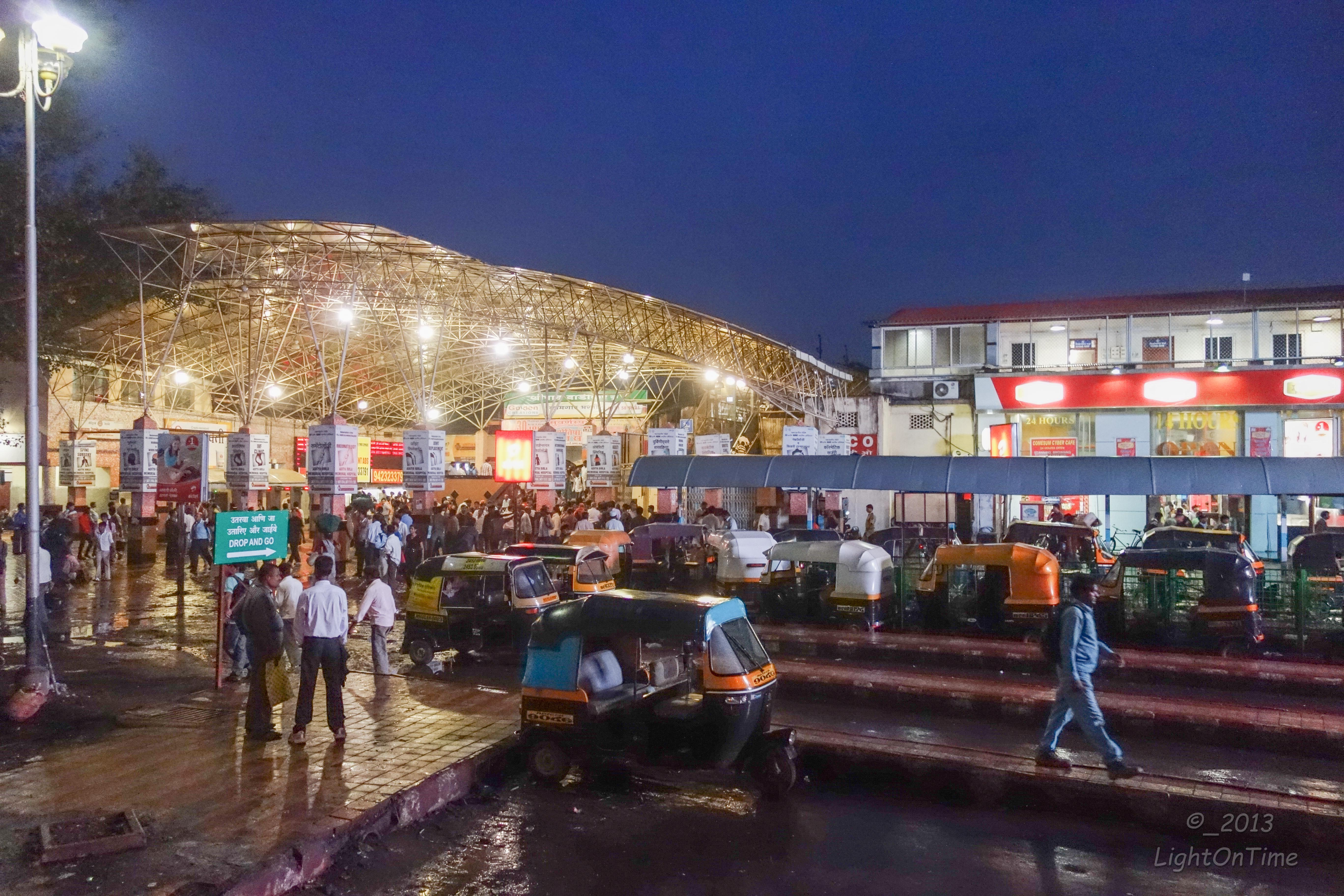
Entrance to Platform 1

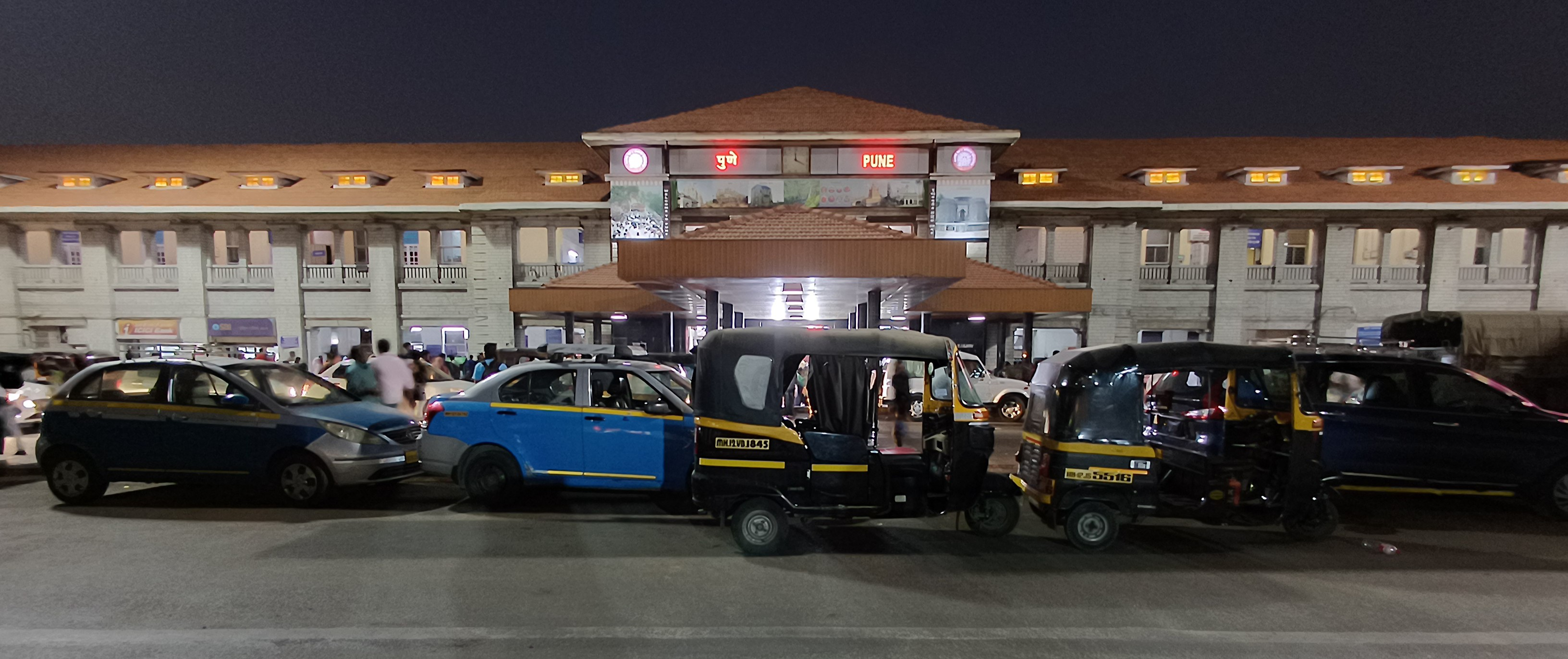
Night view of entrance building

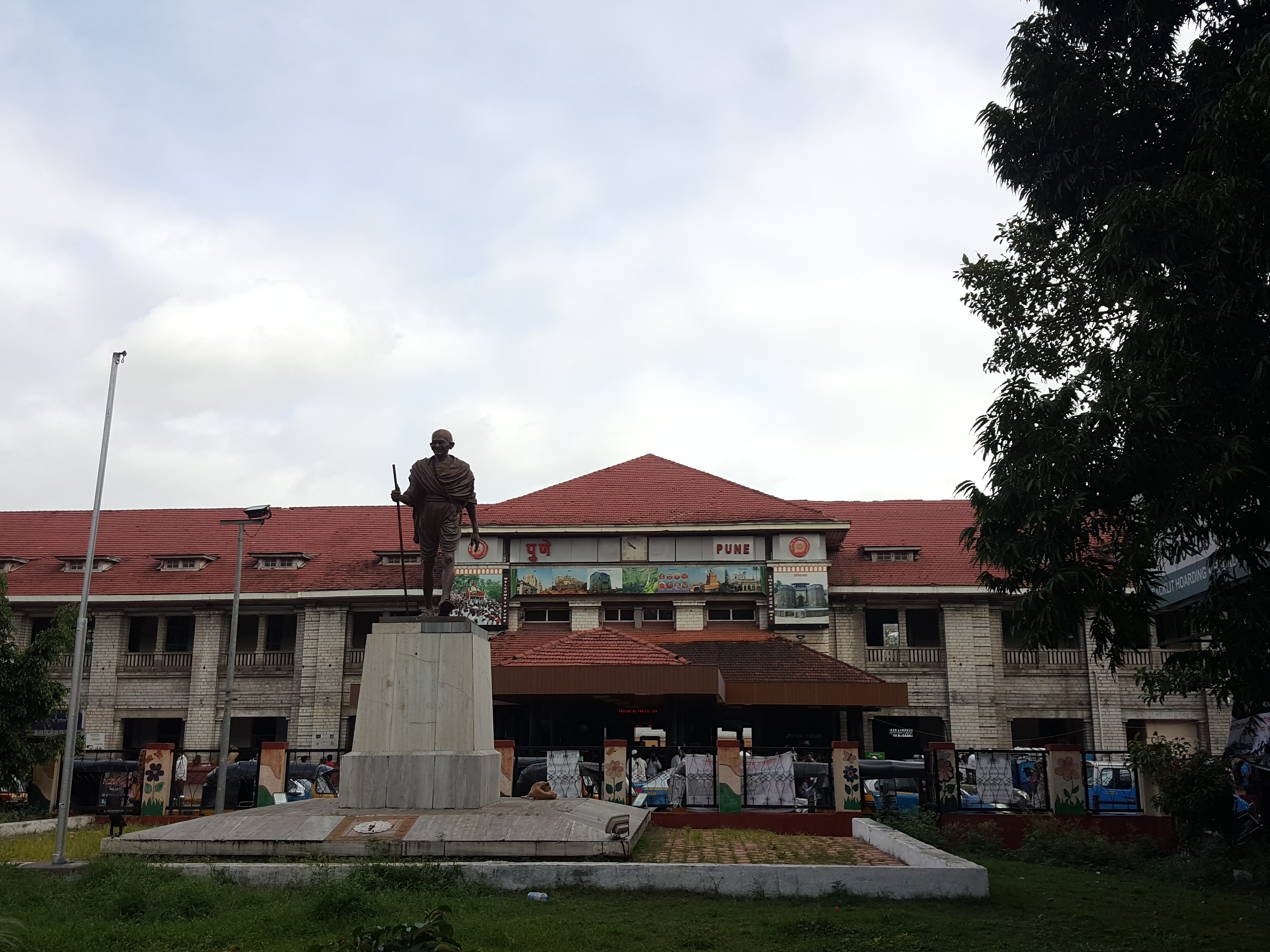
Mahatma Gandhi statue at entrance

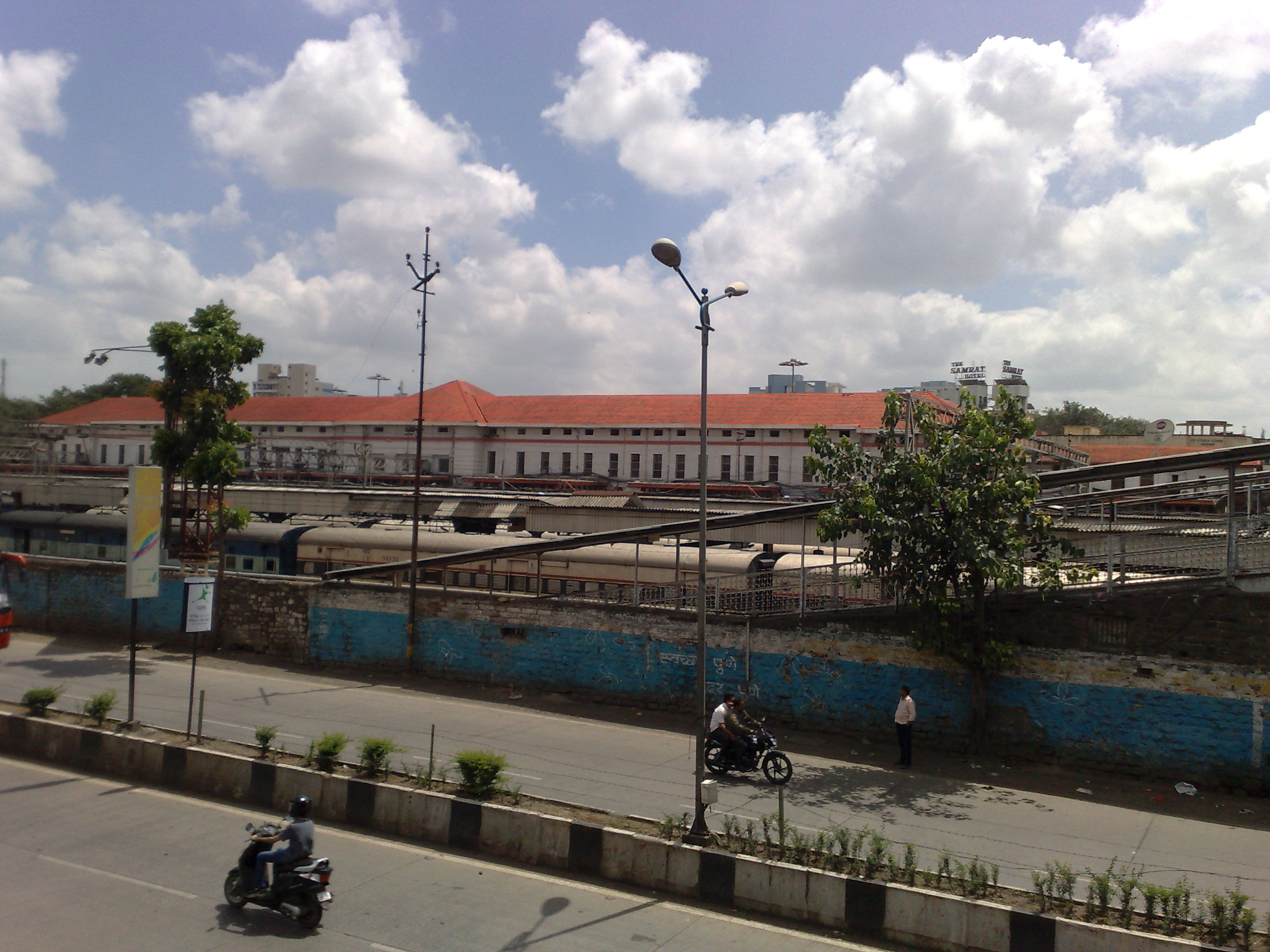
Back view

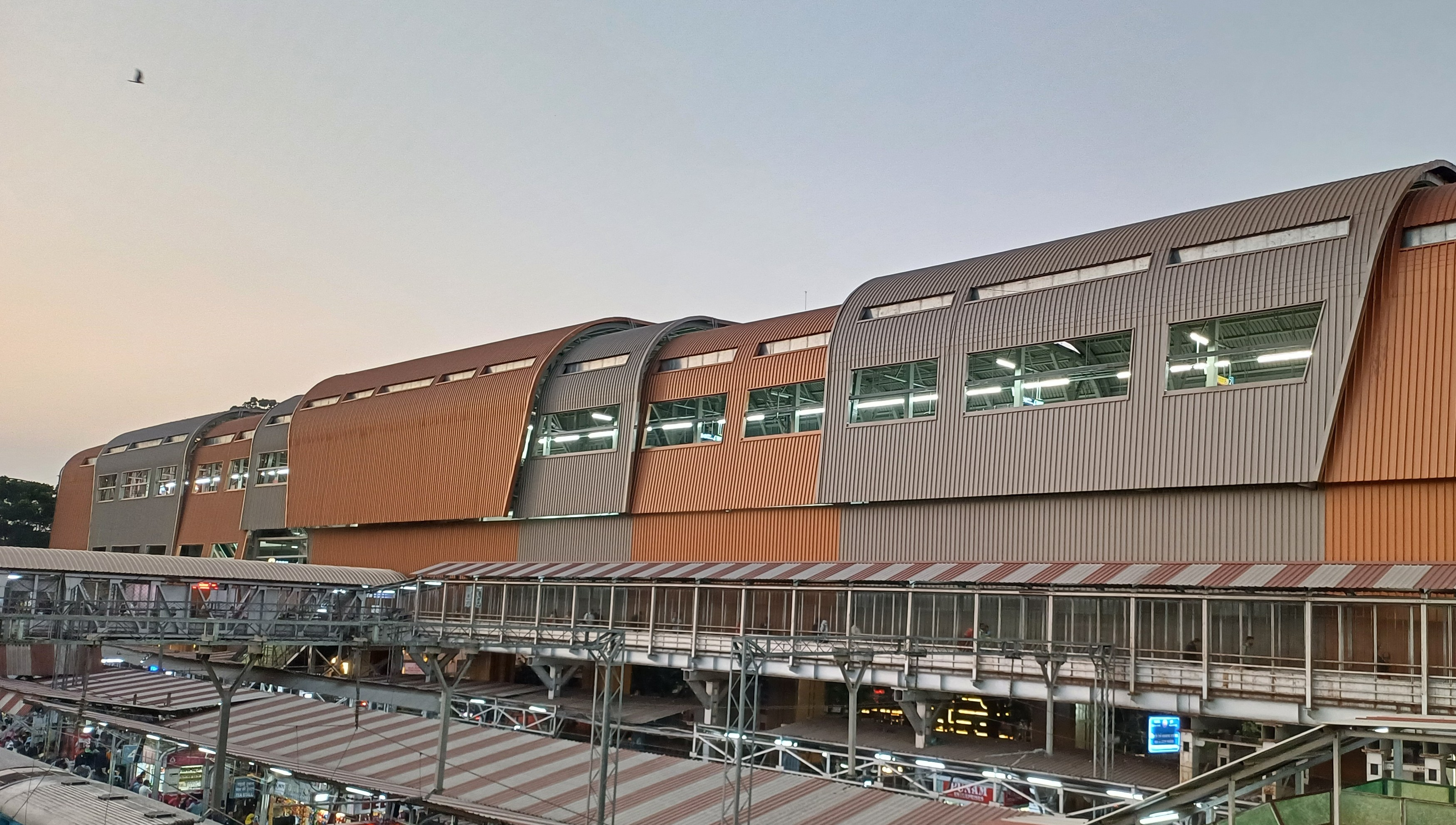
Pune Railway Station metro station near Platform 6

== See also ==
- Dedicated Intercity trains of India
- Pune International Airport
- Pune Station Bus Stand
- List of roads in Pune
