= Pune–Amravati Express =

Train in India

Overview
- Service type: Express
- First service: 31 March 2008; 17 years ago
- Current operator: Central Railway

Route
- Termini: Pune (PUNE); Amravati (AMI)
- Stops: 18
- Distance travelled: 720 km (447 mi)
- Average journey time: 14 hours
- Service frequency: Daily
- Train number: 11025 / 11026

On-board services
- Classes: AC 2 Tier, AC 3 Tier, Sleeper Class, General Unreserved
- Seating arrangements: Yes
- Sleeping arrangements: Yes
- Catering facilities: On-board catering
- Observation facilities: Large windows
- Baggage facilities: Available
- Other facilities: Below the seats

Technical
- Rolling stock: LHB coach
- Track gauge: 1,676 mm (5 ft 6 in)
- Operating speed: 51 km/h (32 mph) average including halts.

The 11025 / 11026 Pune–Amravati Express is an intercity train of the Indian Railways connecting Pune Junction and Amravati of Maharashtra. It was being operated with 11025/11026 train numbers.

== Service ==
The 11025/Pune–Amravati Express has an average speed of 51 km/h and covers 720 km in 14 hrs 00 mins. 11026/Amravati–Pune Express has an average speed of 51 km/h and 720 km in 14 hours 00 minutes.

== Route and halts ==
The important halts of the train are;

- Pune Junction
- Uruli
- Ahilyanagar
- Kopargaon
- Manmad Junction
- Chalisgaon Junction
- Jalgaon Junction
- Bhusaval Junction
- Bodwad
- Malkapur
- Nandura
- Akola Junction
- Badnera Junction
- Amravati

== Coach composition ==
The train has standard LHB rakes with max speed of 130 km/h. The train consists of 16 coaches;

- 1 AC III Tier
- 1 AC Chair car
- 2 Sleeper coaches
- 5 2S Chair car
- 5 General.

== Traction ==
Both trains are hauled by a Kalyan Loco Shed-based WCAM-2 / WCAM-3 electric locomotive from Pune to Amravati and vice versa.

== Rake sharing ==
The train shares its rake with 12157/12158 Hutatma Express.
