= Nagpur–Amritsar AC Superfast Express =

Train in India

Nagpur Junction – Amritsar Junction AC Superfast Express

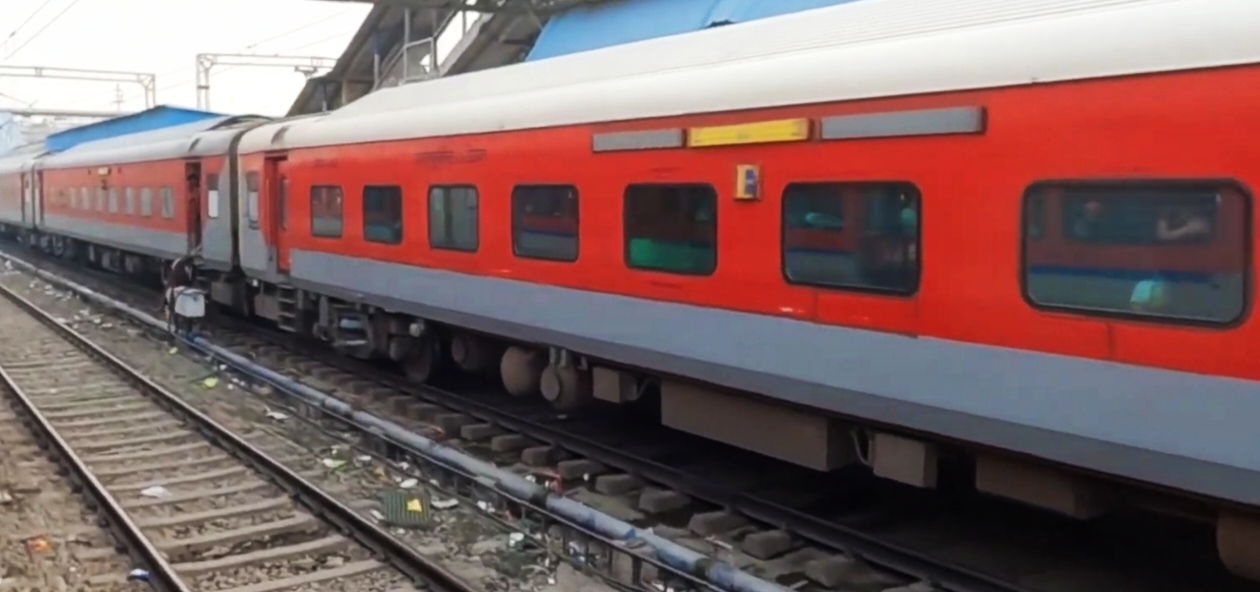
- Nagpur-Amritsar AC Superfast Express Arrived At Itarsi Junction

Overview
- Service type: AC Express
- First service: 13 May 2017; 9 years ago
- Current operator: Central Railway

Route
- Termini: Nagpur (NGP); Amritsar (ASR)
- Stops: 9
- Distance travelled: 1,541 km (958 mi)
- Average journey time: 27 hours
- Service frequency: Weekly.
- Train number: 22125 / 22126

On-board services
- Classes: AC First Class, AC 2 Tier, AC 3 Tier
- Seating arrangements: No
- Sleeping arrangements: Yes
- Catering facilities: Available
- Observation facilities: Large windows
- Baggage facilities: Available
- Other facilities: Below the seats

Technical
- Rolling stock: LHB coach
- Track gauge: 1,676 mm (5 ft 6 in)
- Operating speed: 130 km/h (81 mph) maximum, 60 km/h (37 mph) average including halts.

The 22125 / 22126 Nagpur–Amritsar AC Superfast Express is a AC express train of the AC Express series belonging to Indian Railways – Central Railway zone that runs between Nagpur Junction and Amritsar Junction in India.

It operates as train number 22125 from Nagpur Junction to Amritsar Junction and as train number 22126 in the reverse direction, serving the states of Maharashtra, Madhya Pradesh, Uttar Pradesh, Delhi, Haryana & Punjab.

== Coaches ==
The 22125 / 26 Nagpur–Amritsar AC Superfast Express has 9 AC 3 tier, 4 AC 2 Tier, 1 AC 1st Class & 2 End-on Generator Coaches. It doesn't carry a pantry car.

As is customary with most train services in India, coach composition may be amended at the discretion of Indian Railways depending on demand.

Loco	1	2	3	4	5	6	7	8	9	10	11	12	13	14	15	16
	EOG	H1	A4	A3	A2	A1	B9	B8	B7	B6	B5	B4	B3	B2	B1	EOG

- EOG consists of Luggage and Generator coach
- B consists of AC 3 Tier coach
- PC consists of Pantry car coach
- A consists of AC 2 Tier coach
- H consists of First Class AC coach

== Service ==
The 22125 Nagpur–Amritsar Junction AC Superfast Express covers the distance of 1,541 km (958 mi) in 27 hours 15 mins (57.00 km/h) and in 24 hours 15 mins as 22126 Amritsar–Nagpur AC Superfast Express (64.00 km/h).

As the average speed of the train is above 55 km/h (34 mph), as per Indian Railways rules, its fare includes a Superfast Express surcharge.

== Routeing ==
The 22125 / 26 Nagpur–Amritsar AC Superfast Express runs from Nagpur Junction via Bhopal Junction, Jhansi Junction, Gwalior Junction, Agra Cantonment, New Delhi, Ambala Cantonment Junction to Amritsar Junction.

== Traction ==
As the route is fully electrified, a Ajni Loco Shed-based WAP-7 electric locomotive powers the train up to its destination.

== Operation ==
- 22125 Nagpur–Amritsar AC Superfast Express leaves Nagpur Junction every Saturday & arriving Amritsar Junction the next day.
- 22126 Amritsar–Nagpur AC Superfast Express leaves Amritsar Junction every Monday & arriving Nagpur Junction the next day.
