= Electric Loco Shed, Ajni =

Loco shed in Maharashtra, India

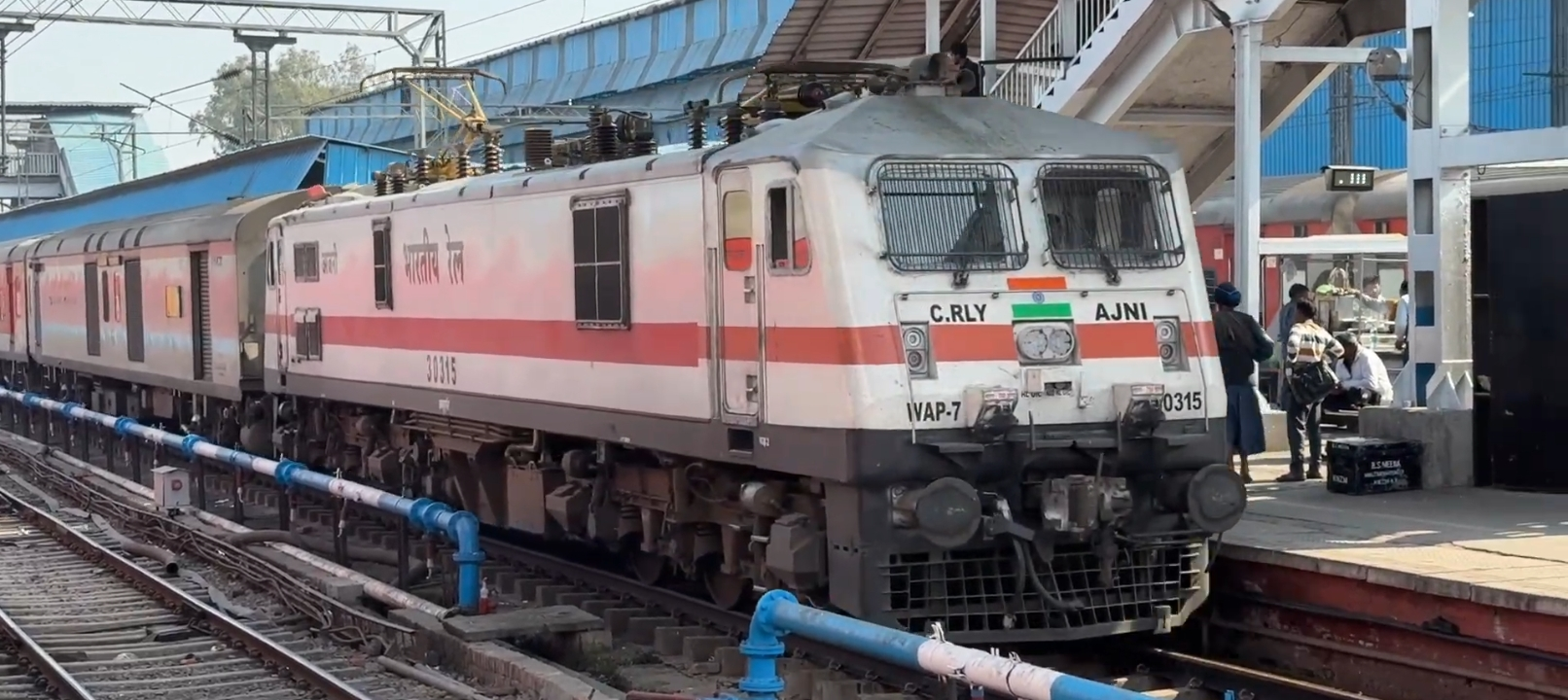
- Ajni based WAP-7 hauling Nagpur-Amritsar AC Superfast Express at Ambala Cantt.

- Location within Maharashtra

Location
- Location: Ajni, Nagpur, Maharashtra
- Coordinates: 21.117160°N 79.082037°E

Characteristics
- Owner: Indian Railways
- Operator: Central Railways
- Depot code: AQ
- Type: Engine shed
- Roads: 6
- Rolling stock: WAP-7; WAG-9

History
- Opened: 2005; 21 years ago
- Former rolling stock: WAM-4; WAG-7; WCAM-2

Electric Loco Shed, Ajni is a motive power depot performing locomotive maintenance and repair facility for electric locomotives of the Indian Railways, under its of the Central Railway division, located in Ajni, Nagpur in Maharashtra, India. It is one of the three electric locomotive sheds of the Central Railway, the others being at Kalyan (KYNE) and Bhusawal (BSLL).

== History ==
After Central Railway set a deadline to eliminate all steam locomotive operations by 1990, a push was given towards establishing electric locomotion as the primary motive power, and the steam locomotive sheds were decommissioned. To meet the needs of exponentially increasing rail traffic on the new continuous broad-gauge lines from Odisha to rest of India with the completion of gauge conversion, the Ajni was selected by Indian Railways for a new electric locomotive shed.

In the late 2003 WAM-4 were introduced which stayed until late 2000s, when they were transferred to Itarsi It later got a large fleet of WAG-7 locos from other sheds.

== Operations ==
Being one of the three electric engine sheds in Central Railway, various major and minor maintenance schedules of electric locomotives are carried out here. It has the sanctioned capacity of 200 engine units. Beyond the operating capacity, this shed houses a total of 284 engine units, all WAP-7 units. It also housed a few WAM-4 locomotives temporarily. Electric loco Shed, Ajni is now housing a large fleet of WAP-7 in Indian Railways and it caters to many long-distance electric trains.

Like all locomotive sheds, AJNI does regular maintenance, overhaul and repair including painting and washing of locomotives. It not only attends to locomotives housed at AJNI but to ones coming in from other sheds as well. It has four pit lines for loco repair. Locomotives of Ajni ELS along with Itarsi ELS were the regular links for all trains running through maharashtra when widespread electrification of railway lines started in East coast Railways. AJNI locomotives are also used for Rajdhani and Duranto trains as well.

== Livery and markings ==
Ajni WAP-7 has Haldiram's Sweets & Namkeens advertised on loco's body side.

Ajni locomotives have a standardized livery all over India.

== Locomotives ==
Serial No.	Locomotive Class	Horspower	Quantity
1.	WAP-7	6350	73
2.	WAG-9	6120	239
Total locomotives active as of January 2026			312

== Alstom Depot, Nagpur ==
In addition to the regular electric shed operated wholly by the Indian Railways, a depot has been setup by Alstom next to the current shed to maintain 250 of Alstom's WAG-12 locomotives.

Electric Loco Shed, Nagpur
Serial No.	Locomotive Class	Horsepower	Holding
1.	WAG-12B	12000	250
Total Locomotives Active as of February 2026			250

== See also ==
- Electric Loco Shed, Kalyan
- Electric Loco Shed, Bhusawal
