= Marathwada Express =

Train in India

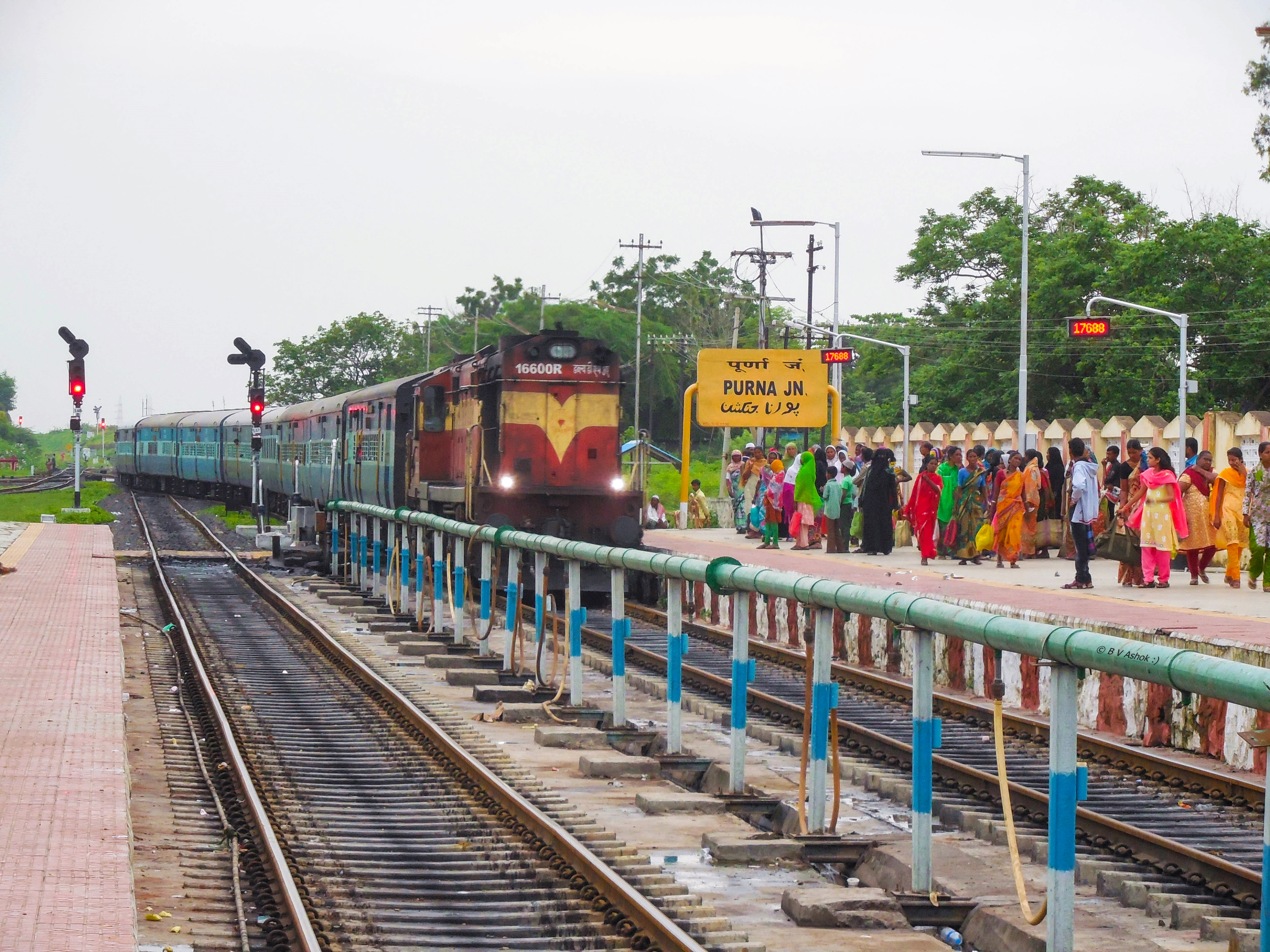
- Marathwada Express at Purna.

Overview
- Service type: Express
- Locale: Maharashtra
- Current operator: South Central Railway

Route
- Termini: Manmad (MMR); Dharmabad (DAB)
- Stops: 23
- Distance travelled: 422 km (262 mi)
- Average journey time: 9 hrs 05 mins
- Service frequency: Daily
- Train number: 17687 / 17688

On-board services
- Classes: AC Chair Car, Second Class Seating, General Unreserved
- Seating arrangements: Yes
- Sleeping arrangements: No
- Auto-rack arrangements: Overhead racks
- Catering facilities: On-board catering, E-catering
- Observation facilities: Rake sharing with 17617/17618 Tapovan Express
- Baggage facilities: No
- Other facilities: Below the seats

Technical
- Rolling stock: ICF coach
- Track gauge: 1,676 mm (5 ft 6 in)
- Operating speed: 47 km/h (29 mph) average including halts.
Route map
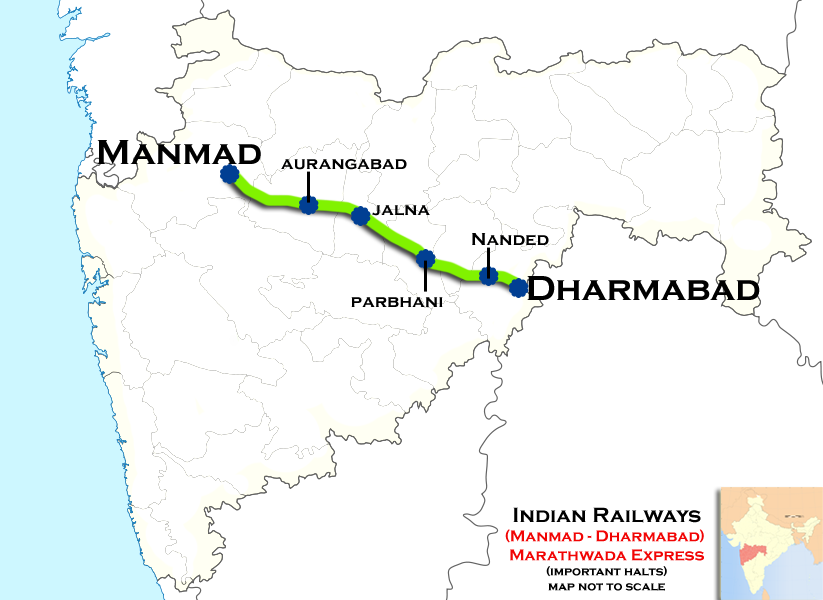
- Marathwada Express (Manmad–Dharmabad) route map

The 17687 / 17688 Marathwada Express is an Express that connects Manmad and Dharmabad. It is also known as the High Court Express. During its journey, it connects many important places in Marathwada such as Aurangabad, Jalna, Parbhani and Nanded.

== Schedule ==
17688 UP Marathwada Express departs Dharmabad at 04:00 IST and reaches Manmad Junction at 13:10 IST. 17687 DOWN Marathwada Express departs Manmad Junction at 15:00 IST and reaches Dharmabad at 23:50 IST. The train covers a distance of 419 km between Manmad Junction and Dharmabad.

== Etymology ==
The train connects almost all the major cities of Marathwada, hence its name Marathwada Express. People from Nanded and Parbhani districts use the train to attend sessions of the Mumbai High Court bench situated at Aurangabad, hence the train got its nickname as High Court Express. It is also known as "Manmad–Dharmabad Composite Express", since it runs as an express train between Dharmabad and Aurangabad and as a passenger train between Aurangabad and Manmad.

== Route and halts ==
The train runs from Manmad Junction via Nagarsol,Tarur,Rotegoan, Potul, Lasur, Daulatabad,Chhatrapati Sambhajinagar, Mukundwadi,Badnapur,Jalna,Ranjani,Partur, Selu, Manwath Road, Parbhani Junction, Purna junction, Hazur Sahib Nanded, Mudkhed,Umari, to Dharmabad.

== Traction ==
As the entire route is fully electrified, both train are hauled by a Kalyan Loco Shed-based WAP-7 electric locomotive from Manmad to Dharmabad and vice versa.

== Rake sharing ==
The train shares its rake with 17617/17618 Tapovan Express.
