= Devagiri Express =

Train in India

Overview
- Service type: Express
- Locale: Telangana & Maharashtra
- First service: 3 February 1992; 34 years ago
- Current operator: Indian Railways

Route
- Termini: Lingampalli (LPI); Mumbai CSMT (CSMT)
- Stops: 30
- Distance travelled: 902 km (560 mi)
- Average journey time: 18 hrs 20 mins
- Service frequency: Daily
- Train number: 17057 / 17058

On-board services
- Classes: AC First, AC 2 Tier, AC 3 Tier, 3 AC (Economy), Sleeper Class, General Unreserved
- Seating arrangements: Yes
- Sleeping arrangements: Yes
- Observation facilities: Rake sharing with 12737/12738 Gowthami Express
- Baggage facilities: Below the seats

Technical
- Rolling stock: LHB coach
- Track gauge: 1,676 mm (5 ft 6 in)
- Operating speed: 50 km/h (31 mph) average including halts
Route map
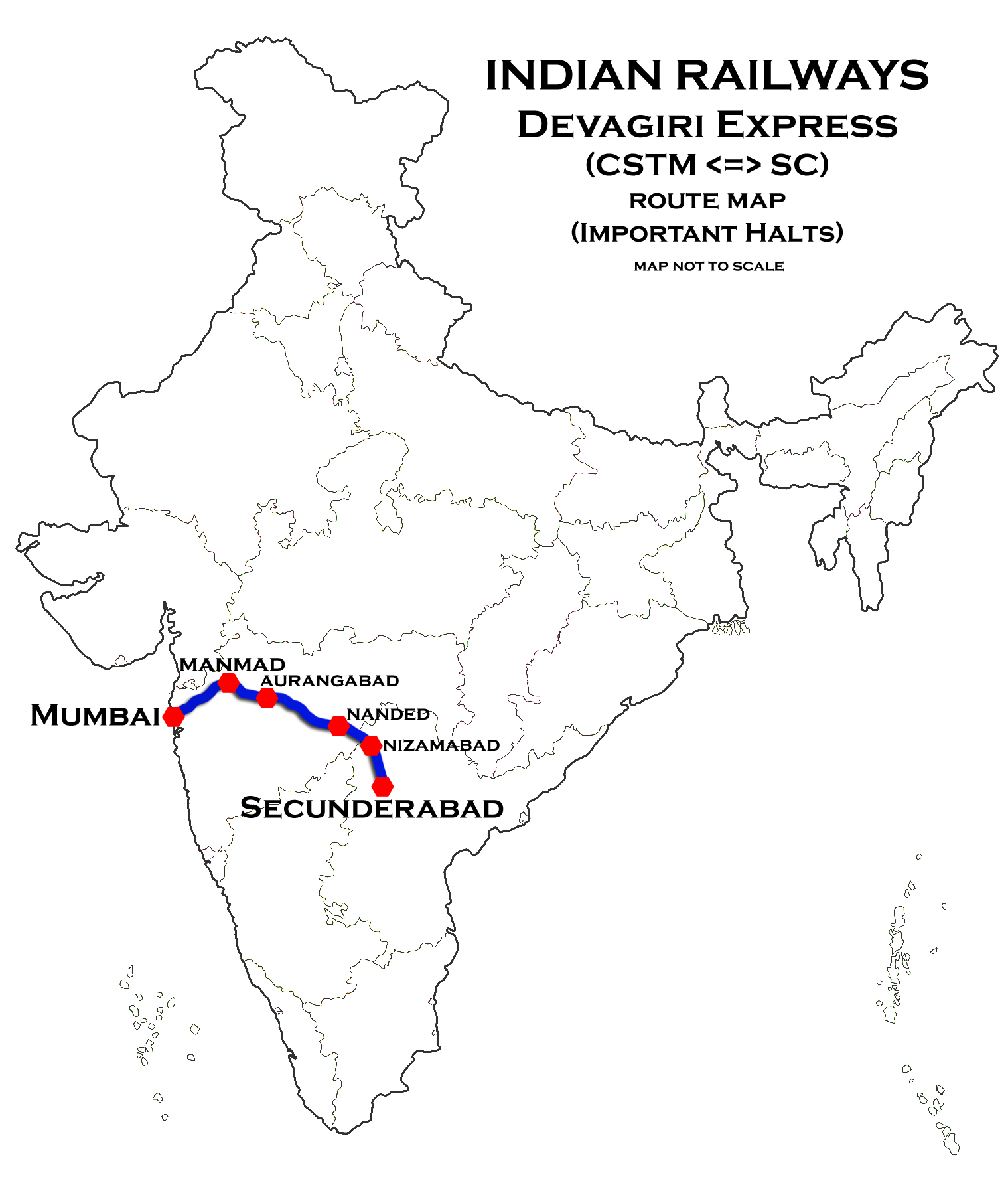

The 17057 / 17058 Devagiri Express is an Express train service. It is operated by the South Central Railway zone zone of Indian Railways. The train runs between Mumbai and Lingampalli, Hyderabad.

The train is extended up to Lingampalli From 14 December 2023, primarily running on Secunderabad–Manmad section via Kalyan Junction, Nashik Road, Manmad, Aurangabad, Jalna, Parbhani, Nanded and Nizamabad. The train shares its rakes with Gowthami Express running between Kakinada and Lingampally.

== History ==
The train started as a daily train between Mumbai and Aurangabad. Devagiri, Devgiri or Deogiri is the ancient name of the town of Daulatabad near Aurangabad. Devagiri was once the capital of India during Muhammad bin Tughluq's rule who shifted his capital from New Delhi to Devagiri and back to New Delhi, this is where the name of the service originates.

The train was later extended to Nanded and then till Nizamabad and then till Secunderabad and presently runs up to Lingampalli.

The train covers its distance of 902 kilometers from Mumbai to Lingampalli in 18 hr 20 m with an average speed of 51 km/h (31.68 mph).

The train links Nashik with Hyderabad for Trimbakeshwar one of jyotirlingas also; another jyotirlinga is Grishneshwar at Ellora near Aurangabad.

The train numbers are 17057DN Mumbai–Lingampalli Devagiri Express and 17058UP Lingampalli–Mumbai Devagiri Express.

This train runs on the historical railway track of Hyderabad–Godavari Valley Railways funded by Nizam of Hyderabad.

The train got new LHB (Linke Hofmann Busch) coaches in February 2023.

=== Powering ===
As of now, the Devagiri Express is hauled by WAP 7 electric locomotive of Lallaguda of Secundrabad as the electrification of Manmad-Mudkhed section is completed. This is the beginning of new era of railway transport in Marathwada region of Maharashtra.

== Route & halts ==
The train runs from Lingampally via Begumpet, Secunderabad Junction, Bolarum, Mirzapalli, Akanapet Junction, Kamareddy, Nizamabad Junction, Basar, Dharmabad, Umari, Mudkhed Junction, Hazur Sahib Nanded, Purna Junction, Parbhani Junction, Manwath Road, Selu, Partur, Jalna, Chhatrapati Sambhajinagar, Lasur, Rotegoan, Manmad Junction, Nasik Road, Igatpuri, Kasara, Kalyan Junction, Thane, Dadar, to Mumbai CSMT.

== Traction ==
The train is hauled by an Lallaguda Loco Shed-based WAP-7 electric locomotive on its entire journey.

== Rake sharing ==
- The train shared its rake with 12737/12738 Gowthami Express.

== Timetable ==
17057; Mumbai CST–Secunderabad Jn.		Devagiri Express timetable			17058; Secunderabad Jn.-Mumbai CST	
Arrival	Departure	Station name	Station code	Distance (km)	Arrival	Departure
--:--	21:10	Mumbai CST	CSMT	0	07:10	--:--
21:22	21:25	Dadar Central	DR	9.0	06:37	06:40
21:42	21:45	Thane	TNA	33.3	06:13	06:15
22:07	22:10	Kalyan Jn	KYN	51.4	05:47	05:50
23:13	23:15	Kasara	KSRA	118.9	--:--	--:--
23:45	23:50	Igatpuri	IGP	133.2	04:10	04:15
00:28	00:30	Devlali	DVL	178.2	03:08	03:10
00:38	00:40	Nasik Road	NK	183.9	02:55	03:00
01:08	01:10	Lasal Gaon	LS	232.2	02:13	02:15
01:55	02:05	Manmad Jn	MMR	256.9	01:40	01:50
03:09	03:10	Rotegaon	RGO	307.7	00:19	00:20
03:34	03:35	Lasur	LSR	334.8	23:49	23:50
04:05	04:10	Aurangabad	AWB	368.5	23:20	23:25
04:58	05:00	Jalna	J	431.3	22:13	22:15
05:39	05:40	Partur	PTU	476	21:29	21:30
06:04	06:05	Selu	SELU	503.3	21:04	21:05
06:19	06:20	Manwath Road	MVO	518.1	20:45	20:46
07:10	07:15	Parbhani Jn	PBN	545.7	20:20	20:22
08:00	08:05	Purna Jn	PAU	574.1	19:35	19:40
08:40	08:45	Hazur Sahib Nanded	NED	604.6	18:45	18:50
09:23	09:25	Mudkhed Jn	MUE	626.9	18:13	16:15
09:43	09:45	Umri	UMRI	646.6	17:19	17:20
10:11	10:13	Dharmabad	DAB	676.2	16:29	16:30
10:30	10:32	Basar	BSX	686	16:18	16:20
11:00	11:05	NIzamabad Jn	NZB	715.3	15:48	15:50
11:50	11:52	Kamareddy	KMC	767.3	15:08	15:10
12:19	12:20	Akanapet	AKE	794	14:44	14:45
12:27	12:28	Mirzapalli	MZL	803.8	14:34	14:34
13:29	13:30	Bollarum	BMO	862.3	13:47	13:48
14:35	14:40	Secunderabad Jn	SC	879	13:20	13:25
14:29	14:30	Begampet	BMT	884	13:03	13:05
15:40	--:--	Lingampalli	LPI	902	--:--	12:25

== Gallery ==
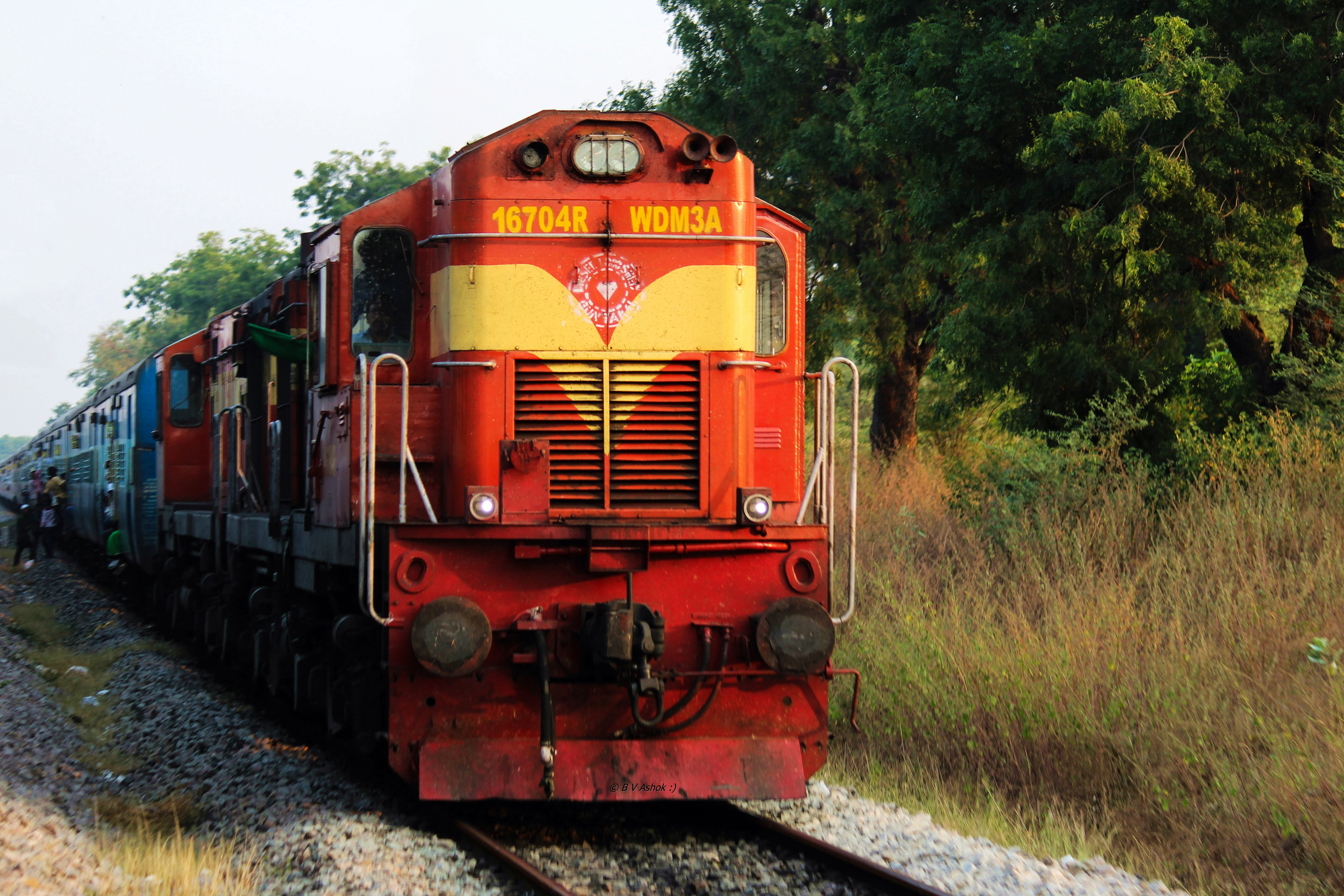
Devagiri Express hauled by WDM-3A diesel locomotive in November 2015 (old ICF era)

== See also ==
- Narayanadri Express
- Ajanta Express
- Hussainsagar Express
- Simhapuri Express
