= Tadoba Express =

Tadoba Weekly Express
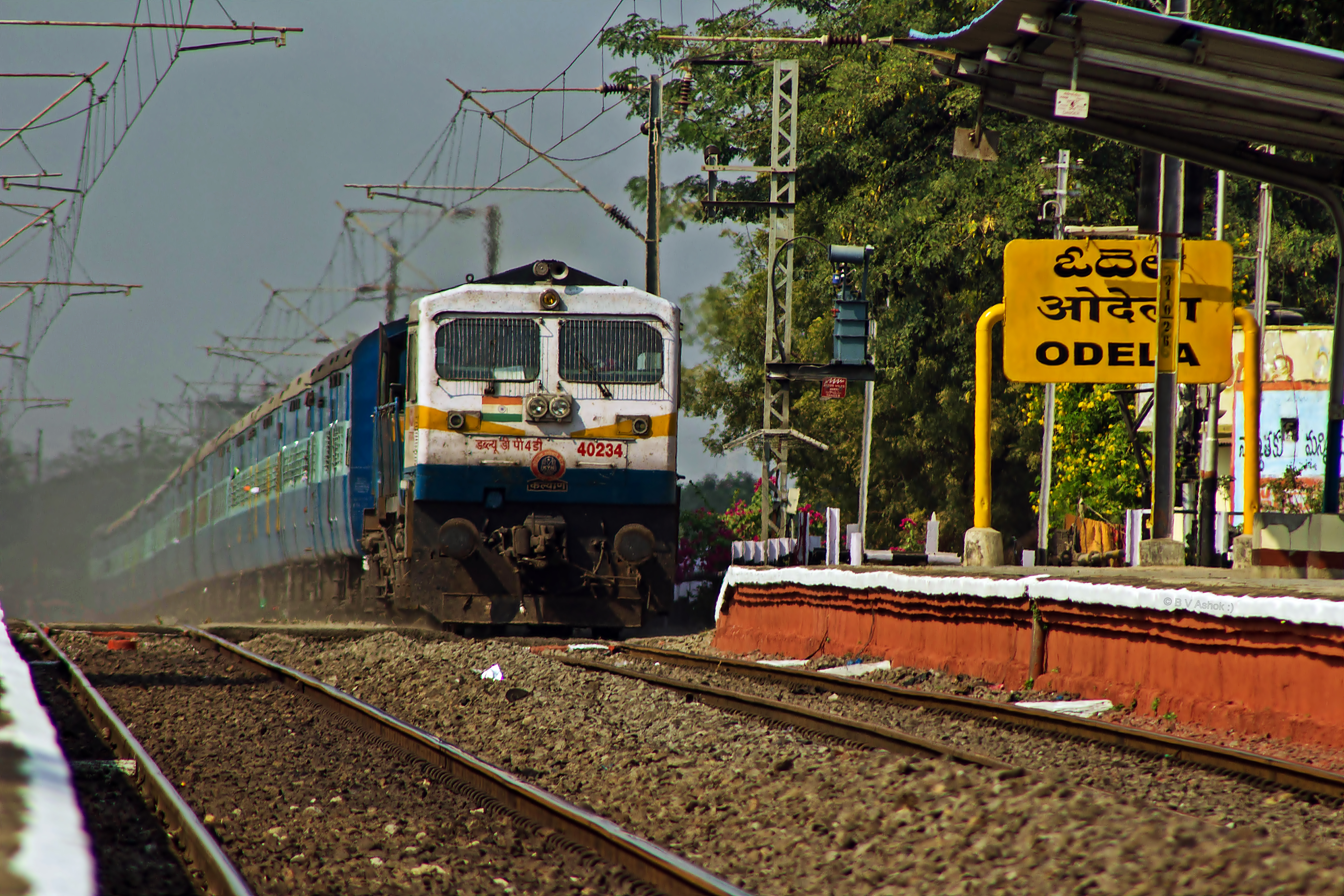
- Tadoba Express passing through Odela railway station

Overview
- Service type: Express
- First service: 8 August 2016; 9 years ago
- Last service: October 2022
- Current operator: Central Railway zone

Route
- Termini: Lokmanya Tilak Terminus (LTT); Kazipet Junction (KZJ)
- Stops: 27
- Distance travelled: 1,153 km (716 mi)
- Average journey time: 27 hours 30 minutes
- Service frequency: Weekly (Note: Runs one days in a week for every direction.)
- Train number: 11083/11084

On-board services
- Classes: AC 2 tier, AC 3 tier, Sleeper class, General Unreserved
- Seating arrangements: No
- Sleeping arrangements: Yes
- Catering facilities: No
- Entertainment facilities: No

Technical
- Rolling stock: 2
- Track gauge: 1,676 mm (5 ft 6 in)
- Operating speed: 42 km/h (26 mph)
Route map
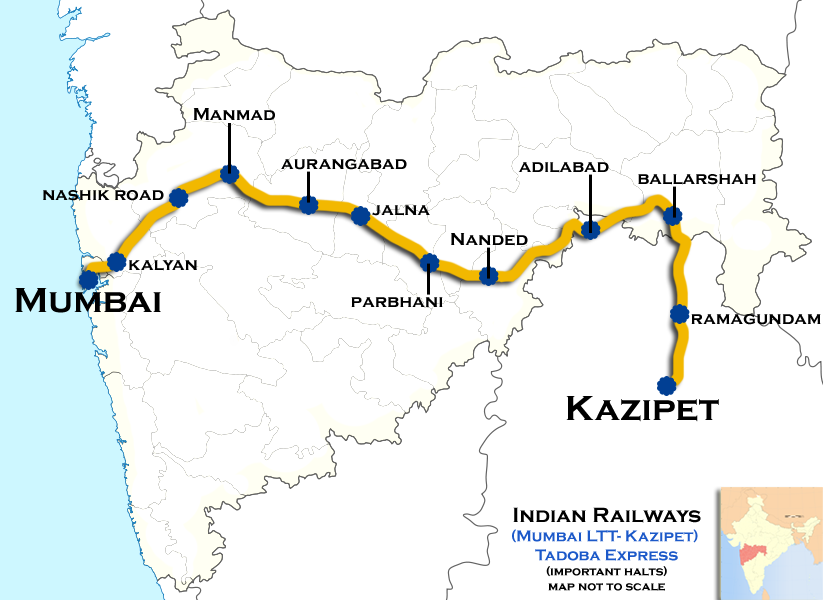

Tadoba Express was an express train of the Indian Railways connecting Lokmanya Tilak Terminus in Maharashtra and Kazipet Junction of Telangana. It was operated with 15603/15604 train numbers on a daily basis. The train service was named after Tadoba Andhari Tiger Project.

Since October 2022, this train service has been withdrawn reportedly due to low occupancy.

== Service ==
- 11083/Tadoba Weekly Express had an average speed of 42 km/h and covered 1153 km in 27 hrs 30 mins.
- 11084/Tadoba Weekly Express had an average speed of 39 km/h and covered 1153 km in 29 hrs 30 mins.

== Route and halts ==
The important halts of the train were:

- Lokmanya Tilak Terminus
- Thane
- Kalyan Junction
- Nasik Road
- Manmad Junction
- Chhatrapati Sambhajinagar
- Jalna
- Parbhani Junction
- Purna Junction
- Hazur Sahib Nanded
- Adilabad
- Chandrapur
- Balharshah Junction
- Mancherial
- Ramagundam
- Kazipet Junction

== Coach composition ==
The train consisted of 15 coaches:

- 1 AC II Tier
- 3 AC III Tier
- 6 Sleeper coaches
- 3 General
- 2 Second-class Luggage/parcel van

== Traction ==
Both trains were hauled by a Kalyan Loco Shed-based WDP-4 diesel locomotive from Kurla to Kazipet.
