= Ajanta Express =

Train in India

Overview
- Service type: Express
- Locale: Telangana & Maharashtra
- First service: 1 April 1967; 59 years ago
- Current operator: South Central Railway

Route
- Termini: Kacheguda (KCG); Manmad (MMR)
- Stops: 18
- Distance travelled: 624 km (388 mi)
- Average journey time: 12 hours 55 minute
- Service frequency: Daily
- Train number: 17063 / 17064

On-board services
- Classes: AC First Class, AC 2 Tier, AC 3 Tier, Sleeper class, General Unreserved
- Seating arrangements: Yes
- Sleeping arrangements: Yes
- Catering facilities: On-Board Catering, E-catering
- Observation facilities: Rake sharing with 12785/12786 Kacheguda–Ashokapuram Express
- Baggage facilities: Available
- Other facilities: Below the seats

Technical
- Rolling stock: LHB coach
- Track gauge: 1,676mm (5ft 6in) broad gauge
- Operating speed: 49 km/h (30 mph) average including halts.
Ajanta Express Route map
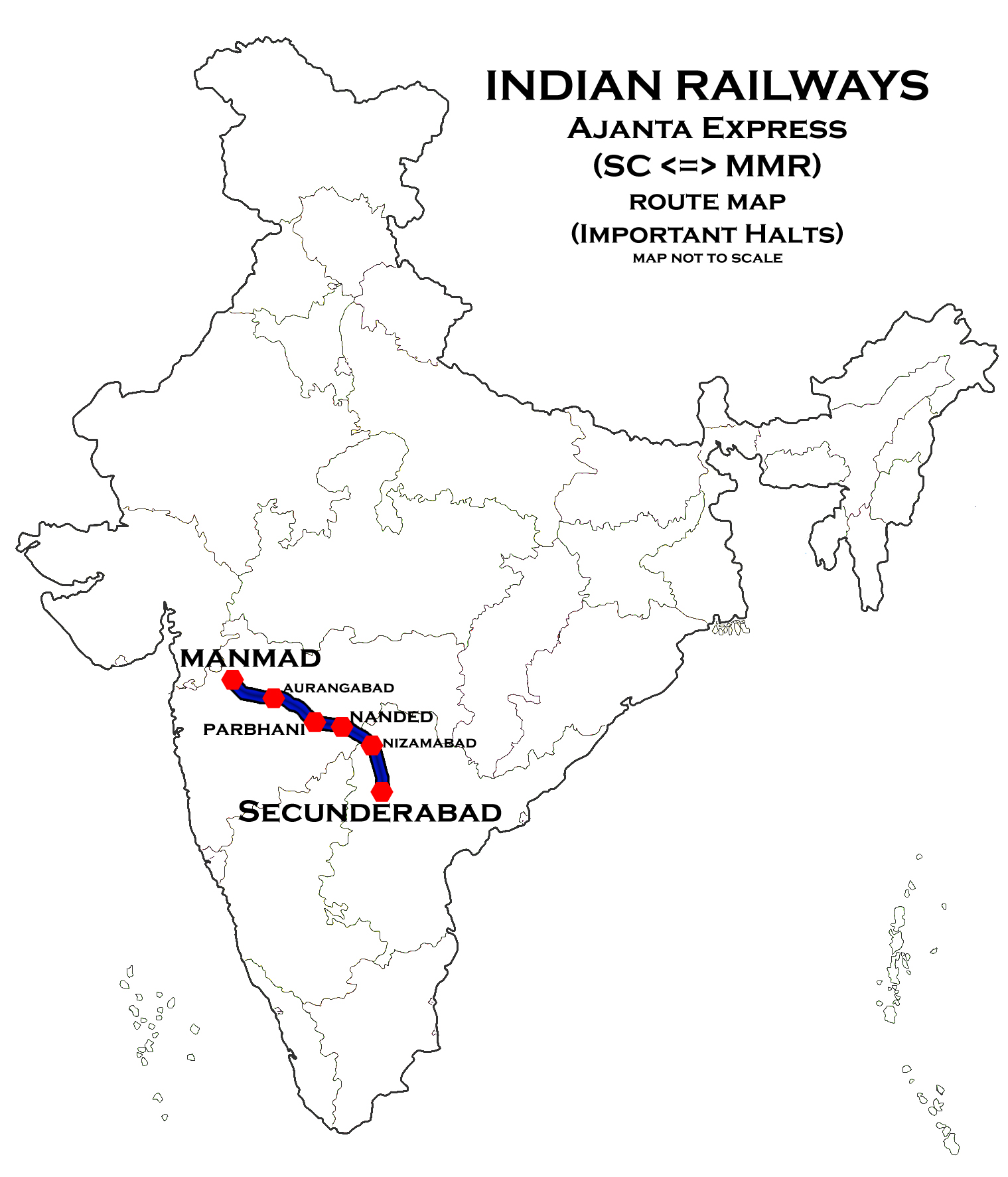

The 17063 / 17064 Ajanta Express is an Express train belonging to the South Central Railway Zone that runs between Kacheguda in Telangana and Manmad in Maharashtra in India.

== History ==
Ajanta Express runs through eastern Maharashtra (Marathwada region) and the north-western region of Telangana. It was known as Kacheguda Express very often by the people travelling on Kacheguda–Nizamabad–Nanded–Parbhani–Aurangabad route on former Hyderabad–Godavari Valley Railways.

The train was introduced on 1 April 1967 as a metre-gauge train between Kacheguda and Manmad via Nizamabad, Nanded, Parbhani and Aurangabad. The train became popular in a short time as Manmad on 5 ft 6 in (1,676 mm) broad gauge was the point to take broad gauge trains to other destinations.

After the track from Manmad to Parbhani was converted to broad gauge in 1992–95 and the track from Parbhani to Mudkhed and Nizamabad was still not converted, the train was re-routed between Kacheguda and Manmad via Bidar and Parbhani in 1995–1996 because the metre gauge had been converted between Vikarabad and Parbhani by then. In 2007, the train again diverted to its old route which had been converted into broad gauge in 2002–2003.

Ajanta Express (Kacheguda–Manmad) was the fastest metre-gauge train in India with an average speed of 42.5 kilometres per hour (26.4 mph) in 1967.

== Overview ==
The train is named after the Ajanta Caves in Aurangabad. It runs daily and connects important stations such as Nizamabad, Nanded, Parbhani, Jalna, Chhatrapati Sambhajinagar and Nagarsol.

The 17063 Manmad–Kacheguda Ajanta Express has an average speed of 48 km/h and covers 624 km in 12 hours 55 minutes. The 17064 Kacheguda–Manmad Ajanta Express has an average speed of 47 km/h and covers 624 km in 13 hours and 25 minutes.

== Timings ==
The train departs from Kacheguda at 6:40 p.m. and arrives at Manmad Junction at 8:05 a.m. the next day. It departs from Manmad Junction at 8:50 p.m. and arrives at Kacheguda at 9:45 a.m. the next day.

== Route and halts ==
- Manmad Junction
- Nagarsol
- Rotegoan
- Lasur
- Chhatrapati Sambhajinagar
- Jalna
- Partur
- Selu
- Parbhani Junction
- Purna Junction
- Hazur Sahib Nanded
- Mudkhed Junction
- Umri
- Dharmabad
- Basar
- Nizamabad Junction
- Kamareddi
- Wadiaram
- Medchal
- Bolarum
- Malkajgiri
- Kacheguda

== Classes ==
The train has standard LHB coach with max speed of 110 kmph. The train consists of 22 coaches:(W.E.F-01/01/2025)

- 1 First AC
- 2 AC II Tier
- 5 AC III Tier
- 8 Sleeper coaches
- 4 General Unreserved
- 1 Seating cum Luggage Rake
- 1 Power car/Generator car

As it is customary with most other train services in India, coach composition may be amended at the discretion of Indian Railways, depending on demand.

== Coach composition ==
Loco	1	2	3	4	5	6	7	8	9	10	11	12	13	14	15	16	17	18	19	20	21	22
	SLR	GEN	GEN	HA1	A2	A1	B5	B4	B3	B2	B1	S8	S7	S6	S5	S4	S3	S2	S1	GEN	GEN	EoG

== Rake sharing ==
- Previously it shared its rake with 12703/12704 Falaknuma Express (1 January 2018 to 14 December 2023).
- From 20th Dec 2023 the train started sharing its rake with 12785/12786 Kacheguda–Ashokapuram Express and the terminal is shifted back to Kacheguda with Primary Maintenance.

== Traction ==
As the route is fully electrified, it is hauled by a Lallaguda Loco Shed based WAP-7 electric locomotive on its entire journey.

== See also ==
- Tapovan Express
- Devagiri Express
- Marathwada Express
