= Pune–Hazur Sahib Nanded Superfast Express =

Indian express train

Pune Hazur Sahib Nanded Superfast Express
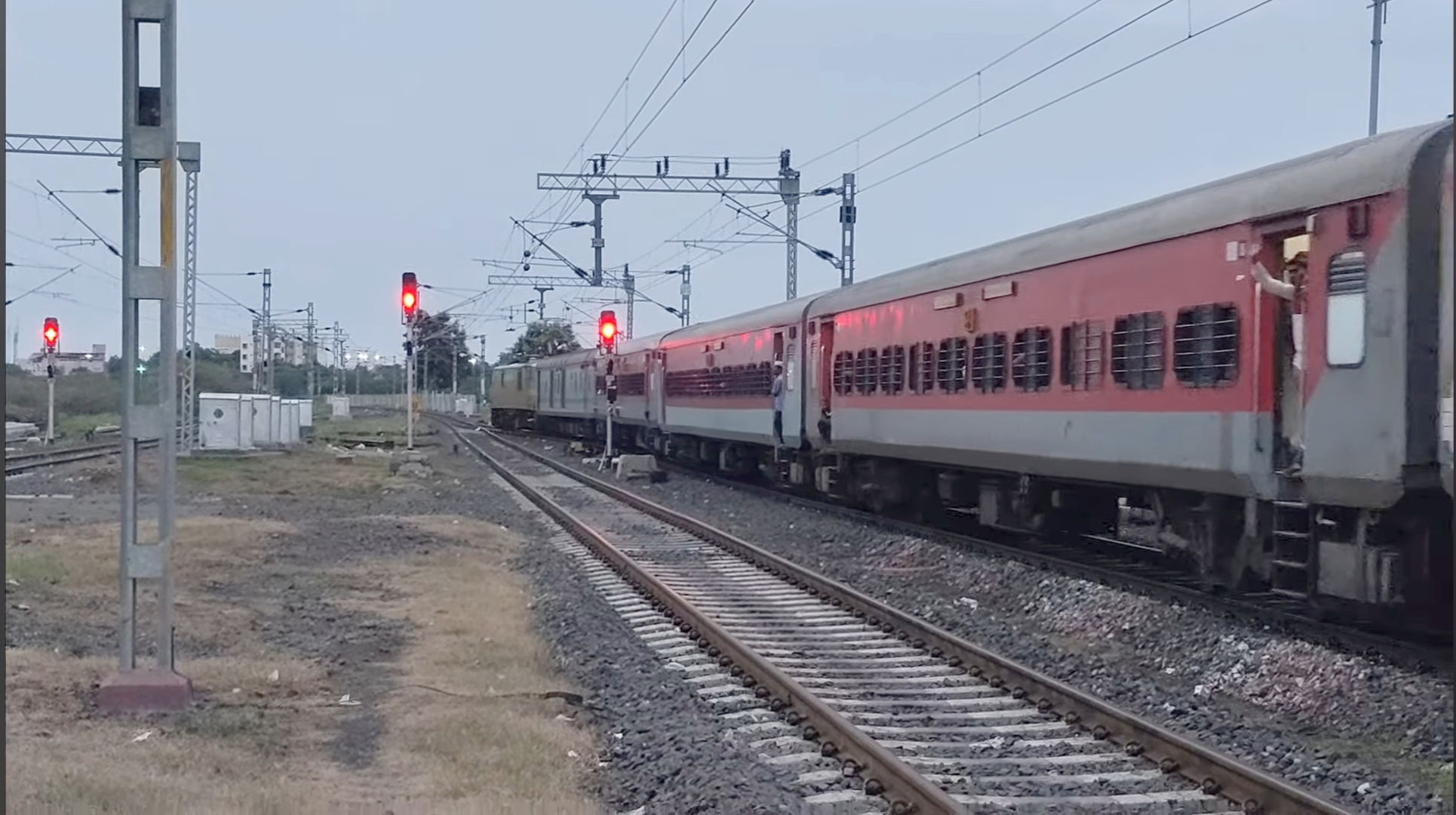
- 17630 Hazur Sahib Nanded-Pune express with LGD WAG-9 departing from Jalna

Overview
- Service type: Superfast
- First service: 2 July 2002 until Pune Jn
- Current operator: South Central Railways

Route
- Termini: Hazur Sahib Nanded; Pune Junction
- Stops: 11
- Distance travelled: 661 km (411 mi)
- Average journey time: 12 hours
- Service frequency: Daily
- Train number: 17629 / 17630

On-board services
- Classes: AC 1st Class, AC 2 tier, AC 3 tier, Sleeper, General
- Sleeping arrangements: Yes
- Catering facilities: No pantry car attached

Technical
- Rolling stock: LHB coach
- Track gauge: 1,676 mm (5 ft 6 in)
- Operating speed: 140 km/h (87 mph) maximum, 55 km/h (34 mph), including halts

Pune-Hazur Sahib Nanded Express is a Superfast train belonging to South Central Railway zone of Indian Railways that runs between Hazur Sahib Nanded and Pune Junction in India.

== Background ==
This train was inaugurated on 2 July 2002 from Hazur Sahib Nanded, flagged off by Nitish Kumar former minister of Railways, and was also included on the 2002 rail budget.

== Service ==
This train operates daily and covers a distance of 661 km with an average speed of 55 km/h with a total track cover time of approximately 12 hours.

== Routes ==
This train passes through Daund Junction, Ahilyanagar, Manmad Junction, Chhatrapati Sambhajinagar, Jalna, Partur, Purna Junction, Parbhani Junction on both sides.

== Traction ==
As the route is fully electrified, a WAG-9 of electric Loco Shed, Lallaguda pulls the train to its destination on both sides.
