= Dharmabad railway station =

Railway Station in Maharashtra, India

Dharmabad Railway Station
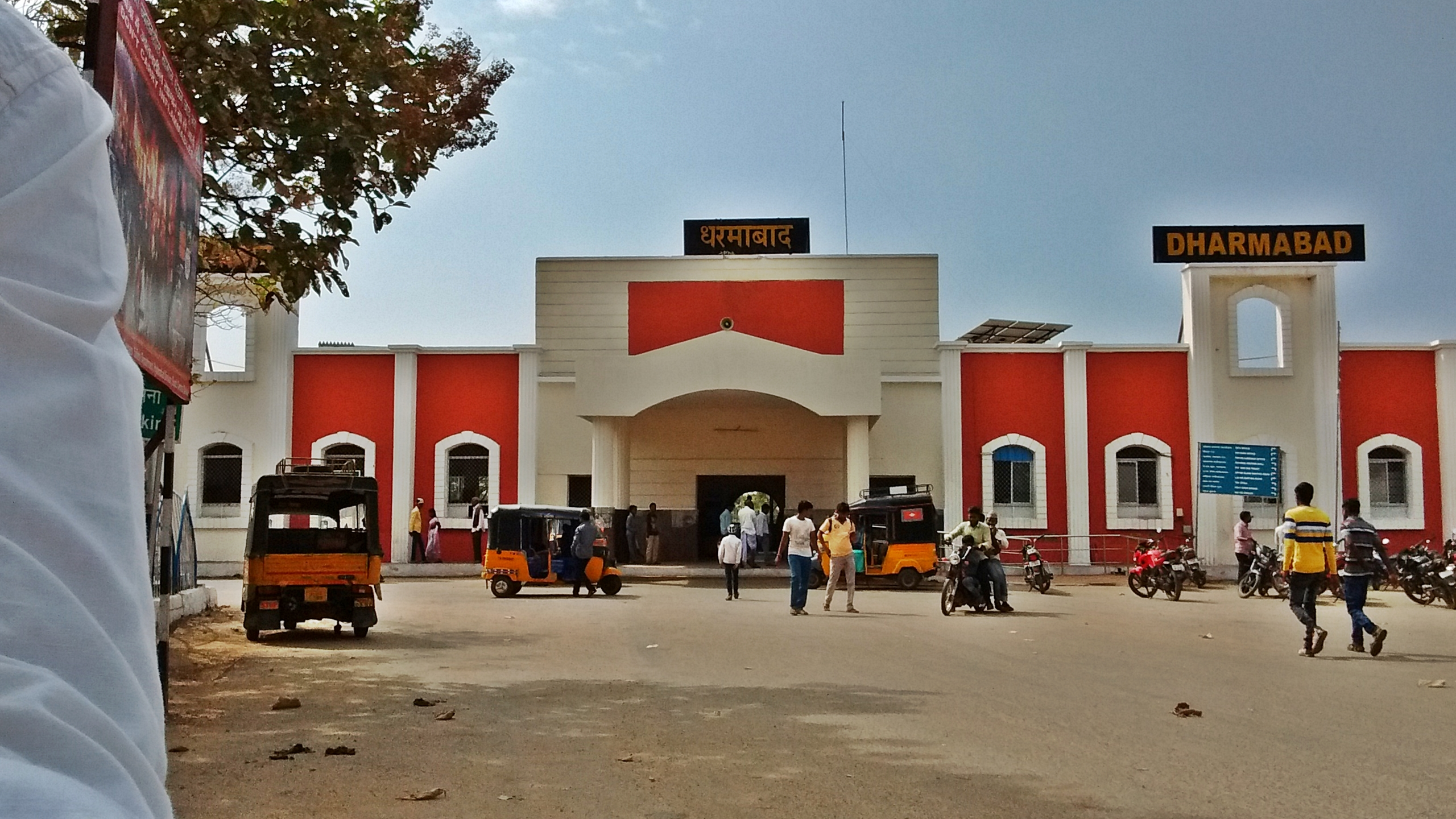
- Dharmabad railway station

General information
- Location: Seeram Road, Degaon, Dharmabad, Nanded district, Maharashtra; India
- Coordinates: 18.8884°N 77.8494°E
- Elevation: 355 metres (1,165 ft)
- System: Indian Railways station
- Owner: Indian Railways
- Operator: South Central Railways
- Line: Secunderabad–Manmad line
- Platforms: 2
- Tracks: 3
- Connections: Auto stand

Construction
- Structure type: At grade
- Parking: Yes
- Accessible: Available

Other information
- Status: Functioning
- Station code: DAB
- Zone(s): South Central Railway
- Division(s): Hyderabad
Location
- Location within Maharashtra Location within India

Dharmabad railway station is a railway station belonging to Hyderabad railway division of South Central Railway. The station is situated in Nanded district of Maharashtra, India. Its station code is DAB.

== Trains ==
- 17687/17688 Dharmabad-Manmad-Dharmabad Marathwada Express
- Tirupati–Sainagar Shirdi Express that connects the two important pilgrimage centres of Tirupati and Shirdi.
- Jaipur–Hyderabad Weekly Express that connects the two important pilgrimage centres of Jaipur to Hyderabad
- Ajanta Express that connects the two important pilgrimage centres of Manmad to Secunderabad
- Hazur Sahib Nanded–Tirupati Weekly Express that connects the two important pilgrimage centres of Nanded to Tirupati
- Hazur Sahib Nanded–Medchel Passenger
- 17058/17057 Secunderabad-Mumbai-Secunderabad Devagiri Express that connects the two important pilgrimage centres of Kurla Mumbai to Nizamabad
- Pune Junction–Nizamabad Jn Nizamabad Passenger
- Tirupati–Amravati Express that connects the two important pilgrimage centres of Amravati Maharashtra to Tirupati Andhra Pradesh.
- Kacheguda–Akola Intercity Express that connects the two important pilgrimage centres of Akola to Kacheguda
- Manmad Junction–Kacheguda Junction Passenger
- Hazur Sahib Nanded–Nizamabad Junction Passenger
- Hazur Sahib Nanded–Hyderabad Junction Passenger
- 11402/11401 Mumbai-Adilabad-Mumbai

Nandigram Express
