= Tapovan Express =

Train in India

Overview
- Service type: Express
- Locale: Maharashtra
- Current operator: South Central Railways

Route
- Termini: Huzur Sahib Nanded (NED); Mumbai CSMT (CSMT)
- Stops: 18
- Distance travelled: 610 km (379 mi)
- Average journey time: 11 hours 55 mins
- Service frequency: Daily
- Train number: 17617 / 17618

On-board services
- Classes: AC Chair Car, Second Class Seating, General Unreserved
- Seating arrangements: Yes
- Sleeping arrangements: No
- Catering facilities: Available
- Observation facilities: Rake sharing with 17687/17688 Marathwada Express

Technical
- Rolling stock: ICF coach
- Track gauge: 1,676 mm (5 ft 6 in)
- Operating speed: 110 km/h (68 mph) maximum, 51.55 km/h (32 mph) average including halts.
Route map
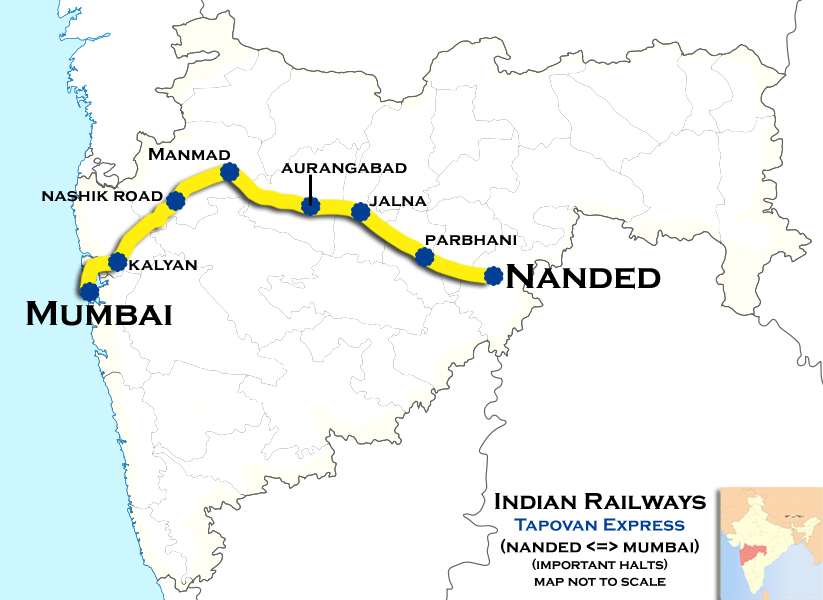
- Tapovan Express (Nanded–Mumbai) route map

The 17617 / 17618 Tapovan Express is an express train belonging to Indian Railways – South Central Railway zone that runs between Hazur Sahib Nanded & Mumbai in India.In the earlier days Tapovan Express was running between Mumbai & Manmad later it extended up to Nanded.

It operates as train number 17618 from Huzur Sahib Nanded to Mumbai CSMT and as train number 17617 in the reverse direction, serving the state of Maharashtra.

Tapovan (Sanskrit) comes from the two root words tapasya – meaning specifically austerity, and more generally spiritual practice, and vana, meaning forest, or wilderness.

== Coaches ==
Tapovan Express has 2 AC Chair Car, 10 Second Class seating, 4 General Unreserved & 2 SLR (Seating cum Luggage Rake) coaches.

In addition, it has a E-Catering service available at Nashik Road, Manmad Jn., Ch. Sambhaji Nagar (Aurangabad), Parbhani Jn. and H.S. Nanded

As is customary with most train services in India, coach composition may be amended at the discretion of Indian Railways depending on demand.

== Service ==
Tapovan Express covers the distance of 610 km (379 mi) in 11 hours 40 mins.

== Routeing ==
The 17618/17617 Tapovan Express runs from Hazur Sahib Nanded via Purna Junction, Parbhani Junction, Manwath Road, Selu, Partur, Jalna, Chhatrapati Sambhajinagar, Lasur, Rotegoan, Manmad Junction, Lasalgaon, Niphad, Nasik Road, Devlali, Igatpuri, Kalyan Junction, Thane, Dadar to Mumbai CSMT.

== Traction ==
As the route is fully electrified Vijayawada WAP-4 locomotive hauls the train from Mumbai CSMT to Hazur Sahib Nanded, and vice versa.

== Rake sharing ==
The train shares its rake with 17687/17688 Marathwada Express.

== Operation ==
Tapovan Express runs on a daily basis in both directions.
