= Mamdapur Conservation Reserve =

Conservation reserve in Maharashtra, India

- IUCN category II (national park)
- Location within Maharashtra
- Location: Nashik District, Maharashtra, India
- Nearest city: Malegaon and Nandgaon
- Coordinates: 20°10′32.6″N 74°43′07.3″E
- Area: 54.46 km^{2} (21.03 sq mi)
- Established: July 2014
- Governing body: Maharashtra State Forest Department

The Mamdapur Conservation Reserve is located in Nashik District, near Manikpunj Town of Maharashtra state. The sanctuary is spread over an area of 54.46 square kilometres. This reserve is famous for sighting scrub land birds and mammals.

== Location ==
The sanctuary is located 35 km east of Manmad town. The nearest rail head is Manmad Junction railway station. Regular buses are available from Nandgaon Bus Stand. The forest area is open for visitors from sunrise to sunset. The place can be visited all the year around.The conservation reserve is spread over forest area of villages Rajapur, Somthanjosh, Mamdapur, Kharvandi and Devdari in Yeola taluka of Nashik District.

== Biodiversity ==
The reserve is famous for black buck antelopes. The population of black buck is around 3000 to 4000
