= Nizamabad–Kacheguda DEMU =

Railway train service

Nizamabad Kacheguda DEMU
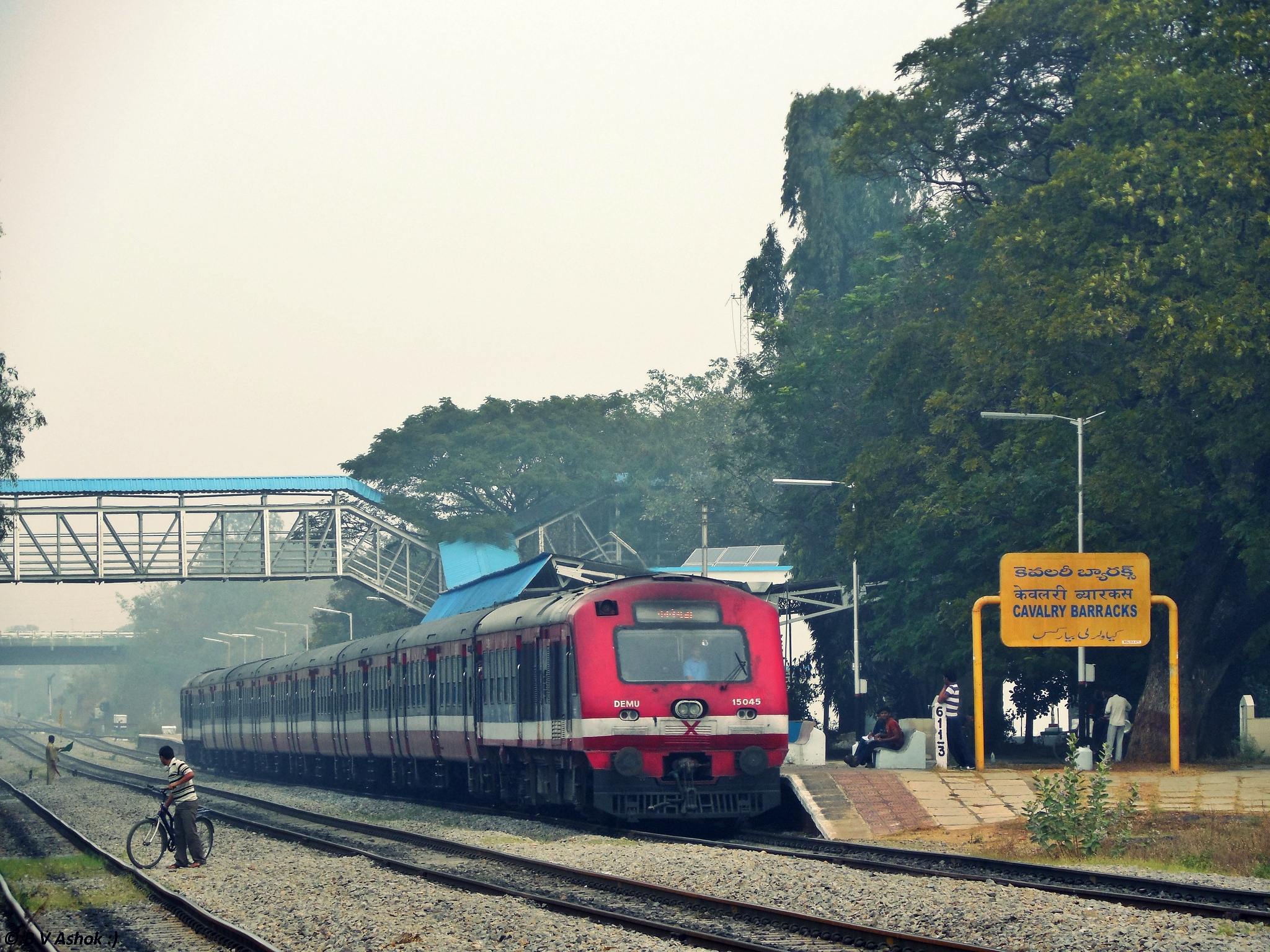
- Nizamabad Kacheguda Demu at Cavalry Barracks

Overview
- Service type: DEMU
- Current operator: South Central Railways

Route
- Termini: Nizamabad; Kacheguda
- Stops: 12
- Distance travelled: 166 km (103 mi)
- Average journey time: 4 hours 10 minutes
- Service frequency: Tri-Daily
- Train numbers: 57689/90; 57687/88; 57602/01

On-board services
- Class: General Unreserved

Technical
- Rolling stock: 3
- Operating speed: Avg 40 km/h (25 mph)
Route map
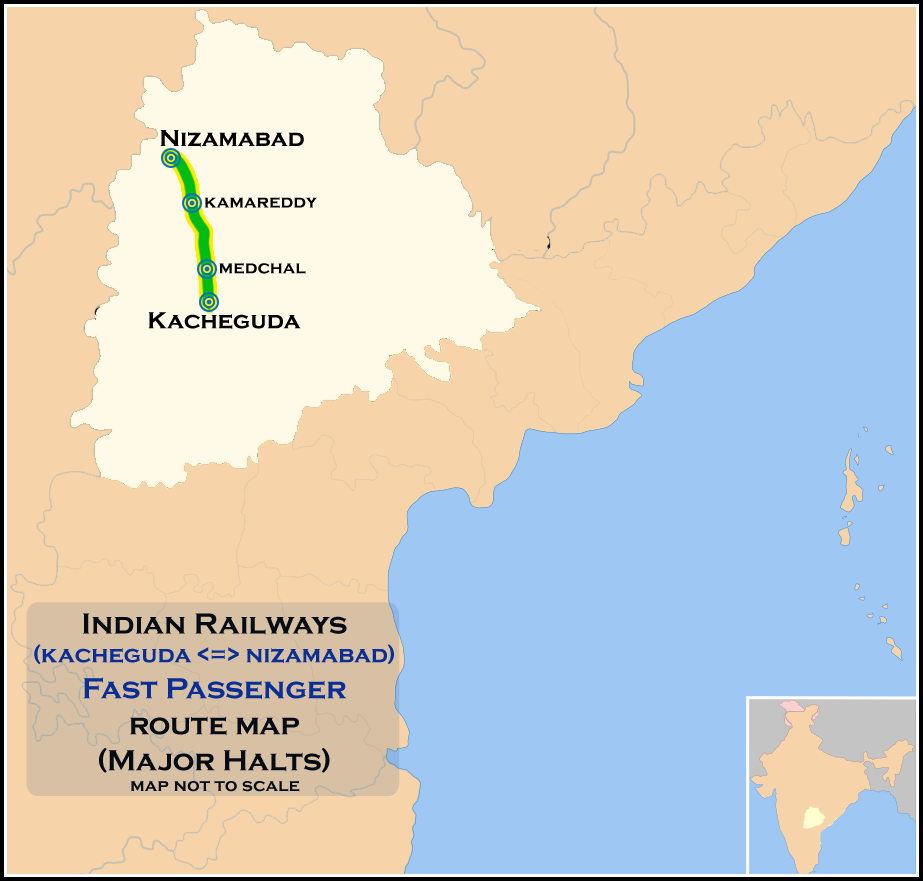

The Nizamabad–Kacheguda DEMU is a tri-daily train that runs between the cities of Nizamabad and Hyderabad both situated in state of Telangana. The trains runs on Secunderabad–Manmad line of Hyderabad railway division under South Central Railway zone.

== History ==
The train service was started in March 2012 which used to run twice a day from Nizamabad to Kacheguda and on daily basis except on Thursday and Sunday. Later on in early 2015 seeing the high rush of passengers between these two major cities of the state, the South Central Railway flagged off another train from Nizamabad at 18:40 IST. As of Aug 2019, the 3 services run on a daily basis from Nizamabad railway station to Kacheguda railway station.

== Service ==
The trains depart Nizamabad railway station thrice a day with train no. 57689/87/02 covering a distance of 166 kilometers in 4 hours and 10 minutes, and halt at 12 important stations of Sirnapalli, Uppalavai, Kamareddi, Akanapet, Mirzapalli, Wadiaram, Medchal, Bolarum, Malkajgiri Junction, Sitafalmandi and finally arrives at Kacheguda and returns with train no. 57601/90/88.

== See also ==
- Nizamabad–Peddapalli section
- Ajanta Express
