= Tirupati–Sainagar Shirdi Express =

Train in India

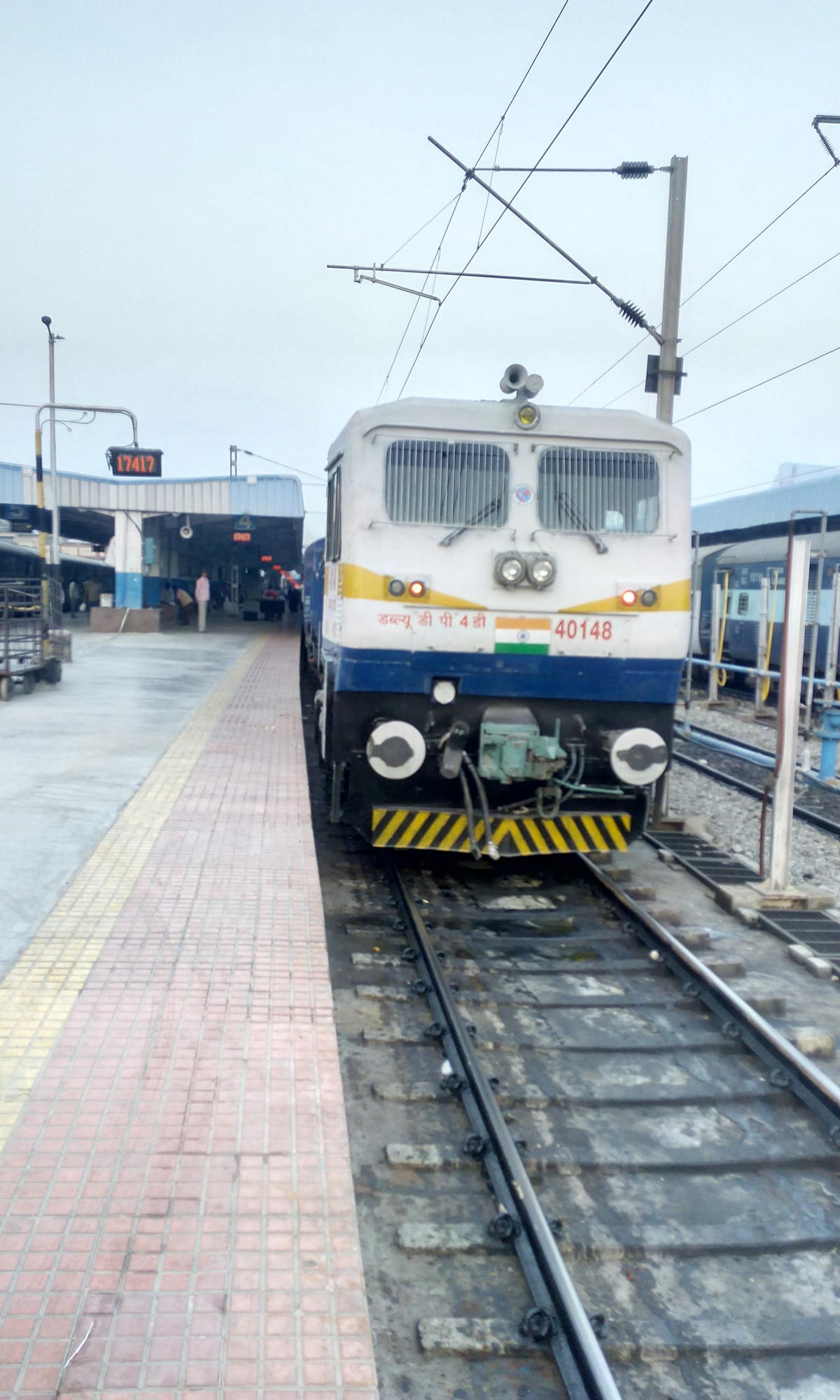
- Tpty–Snsi Express ready to leave Tirupati

Overview
- Service type: Express
- Locale: Andhra Pradesh, Karnataka, Telangana, Maharashtra
- First service: 26-12-2015
- Current operator: South Coast Railways

Route
- Termini: Tirupati; Sainagar Shirdi
- Distance travelled: 1,436 km (892 mi)
- Average journey time: 29 hrs 15 min
- Service frequency: Weekly
- Train number: 17417 / 17418

On-board services
- Classes: Second A/c, Third A/c, Sleeper class, Unreserved
- Seating arrangements: Yes
- Sleeping arrangements: Yes

Technical
- Operating speed: 49 km/h (30 mph)
Route map
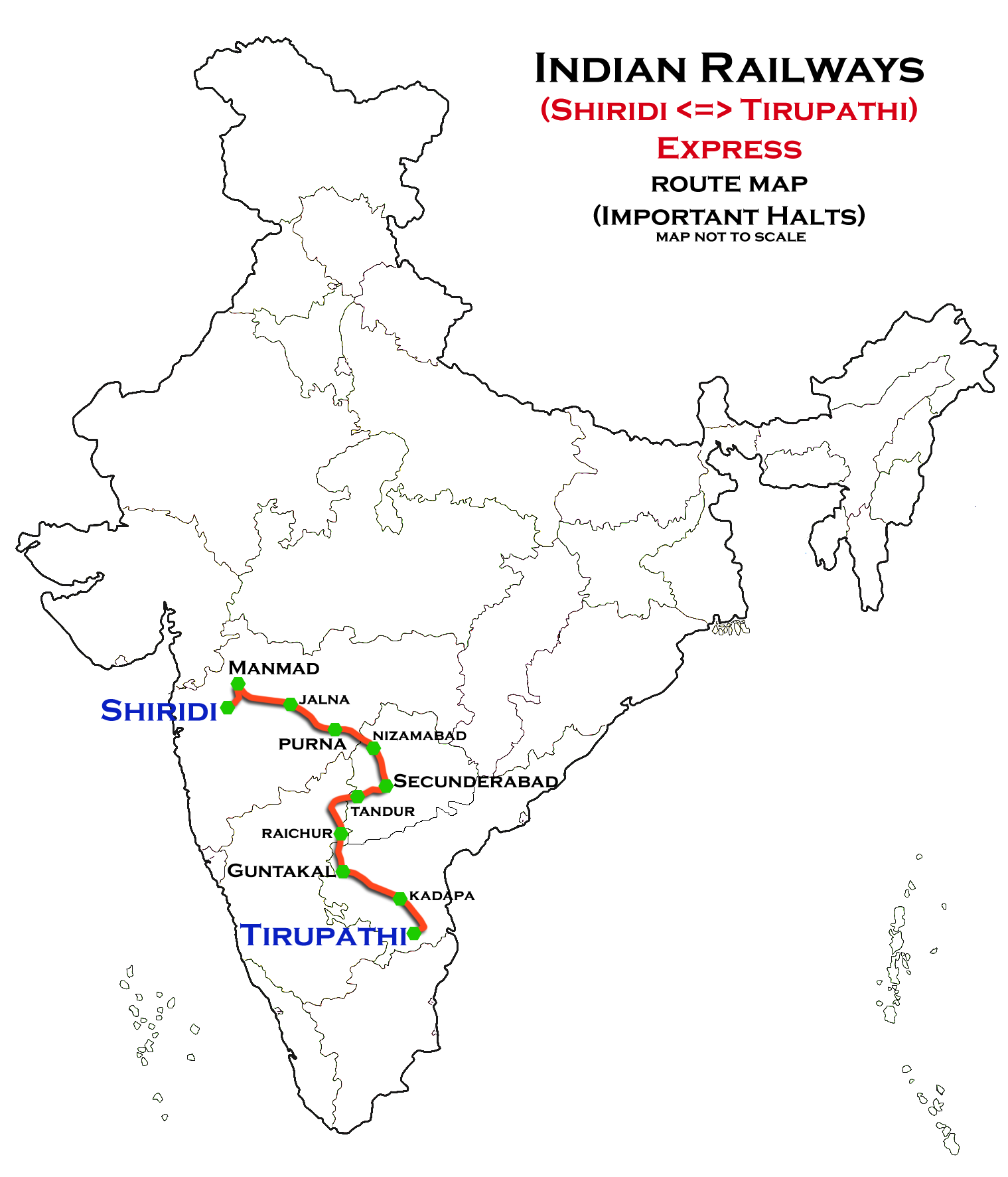

Tirupati–Sainagar Shirdi Express is an Express train belonging to Indian Railways which connects Tirupati in Andhra Pradesh with Shirdi in Maharashtra.

== Service ==
It operates as train number 17417 from Tirupati to Sainagar Shirdi and as train number 17418 in the reverse direction, serving the states of Andhra Pradesh, Karnataka, Telangana & Maharashtra . The train covers the distance of 1,436 km (892 mi) in 29 hours 15 mins approximately at a speed of (48 km/h (30 mph)).

== Coaches ==
The 17417 / 18 Tirupati–Sainagar Shirdi Express has 1 AC 2-tier, 4 AC 3-tier, 10 sleeper class, 4 general unreserved & two SLR (seating with luggage rake) coaches . It carries a pantry car and from June 2 nd wef from Tirupati and from Sainagar Shirdi June 4 this train converted into LHB Coaches and it has 1 AC 2-tier, 4 AC 3-tier, 8 sleeper class, 4 general unreserved & 1 SLR (seating with luggage rake) and 1 EOG Engine generator and a 1 pantry car coaches .

As with most train services in India, coach composition may be amended at the discretion of Indian Railways depending on demand.

== Routeing ==
The 17417 / 18 Tirupati–Sainagar Shirdi Express runs from Tirupati via Renigunta Junction, Gooty Junction, Guntakal Junction, Secunderabad Junction, Hazur Sahib Nanded, Parbhani Junction, Jalna, Chhatrapati Sambhajinagar, Manmad Junction, Puntamba to Sainagar Shirdi.

== Rake share ==
This train rake share with

- 17429/17430 - Tirupati-Akola Express

== Traction ==
As this route is fully electrified, train is hauled by WAP-4 locomotive of Bhusawal from Tirupati to Sainagar Shirdi and vice-versa.
