= Manwath Road railway station =

Railway Station in Maharashtra, India

General information
- Location: Manwath Road, Manwat, Parbhani, Maharashtra; India
- Coordinates: 19.3587°N 76.5349°E
- Elevation: 422 metres (1,385 ft)
- System: Indian Railways station
- Owner: Indian Railways
- Operator: South Central Railway
- Line: 03
- Platforms: 2
- Tracks: 4
- Connections: Auto stand

Construction
- Structure type: At grade
- Parking: Yes
- Cycle facilities: No

Other information
- Status: Functioning
- Station code: MVO
- Zone(s): South Central Railway
- Division(s): Nanded

History
- Closed: NA
Location

Manwath Road railway station is a main railway station in Parbhani district, Marathwada region of the Maharashtra. Its code is MVO. It serves Manwath village. It is administered by the Nanded Division of South Central Railway. The station consists of two platforms. The platforms are not well sheltered. It lacks many facilities including water and sanitation.

The station lines on Kacheguda-Manmad rail route. It is 8 km from taluka headquarter Manwath.

== Trains ==
Some of the trains that runs from Manwath Road are:

- Sainagar Shirdi–Vijayawada Express
- Aurangabad–H.S. Nanded Weekly Express
- Sainagar Shirdi–Secunderabad Express
- Ajanta Express
- Kakinada Port–Sainagar Shirdi Express
- Dharmabad–Manmad (Marathwada) Composite Express
- Hazur Sahib Nanded–Aurangabad Weekly Express
- Nandigram Express
- Tapovan Express
- Renigunta–Aurangabad Weekly Express
- Devagiri Express
