= Ankai Killa railway station =

Railway Station in Maharashtra, India

Ankai Killa
- Indian Railways logo

General information
- Location: Ankai Killa, Maharashtra; India
- Coordinates: 20°10′58″N 74°26′16″E
- Elevation: 20 metres (66 ft)
- System: Indian Railways station
- Owner: Indian Railways
- Operator: Western Railway
- Platforms: 4
- Tracks: 8
- Connections: Auto stand

Construction
- Structure type: Standard (on-ground station)
- Parking: No
- Cycle facilities: No

Other information
- Status: Functioning
- Station code: AAK
- Zone(s): Western Railway
- Division(s): Vadodara
Location
- Location within India Location within Maharashtra

Ankai Killa railway station is a station located on the Daund Manmad branch line in Manmad, Nashik District, India. The Pune Manmad and the Pune Nizambad passenger trains stop at this station.

In July 2022, the Bhusawal Division of the Central Railway has done the doubling of tracks work in a stretch of 8.5 km between the Ankai Killa-Manmad section under the Daund-Manmad doubling project. In February 2025, Ankai was among the 45 projects which were sanctioned resources for development of a bypass line and doubling work between Aurangabad.
