= Jalna railway station =

Railway Station in Maharashtra, India

Jalna
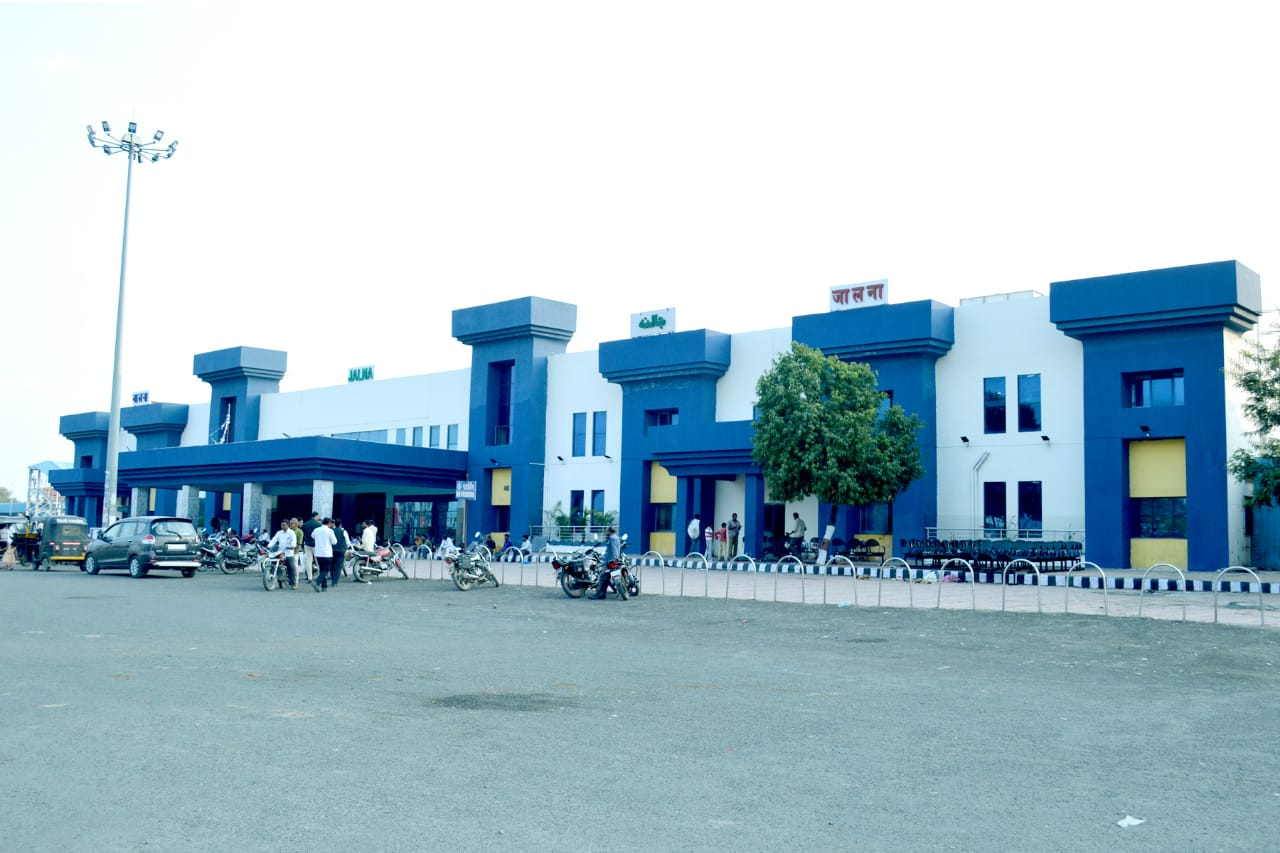
- Station entrance

General information
- Location: Railway Station Road, Nariman Nagar Jalna, Maharashtra
- Coordinates: 19°49′50″N 75°53′35″E
- Elevation: 502 metres (1,647 ft)
- System: Express train and Passenger train station
- Owner: Indian Railways
- Operator: South Central Railway
- Line: Secunderabad–Manmad line
- Platforms: 3
- Tracks: 4

Construction
- Structure type: At grade
- Parking: available
- Cycle facilities: Yes

Other information
- Status: Active
- Station code: J
- Zone(s): South Central Railway
- Division(s): Nanded

History
- Former names: Nizam's Guaranteed State Railway
Location
- Location within India Location within Maharashtra

Jalna railway station is a train station in the city of Jalna in the Indian state of Maharashtra. Jalna station lies on the Secunderabad–Manmad line of South Central Railway zone. Jalna is an important station in the Marathwada region with several trains stopping here daily. The government had approved a new line between Khamgaon and Jalna of Vidarbha and Marathwada region respectively.

== Amenities ==
Amenities at Jalna railway station including computerized reservation office, ticket counters, waiting room, retiring room, vegetarian and non-vegetarian refreshments and other stalls.

== Gallery ==
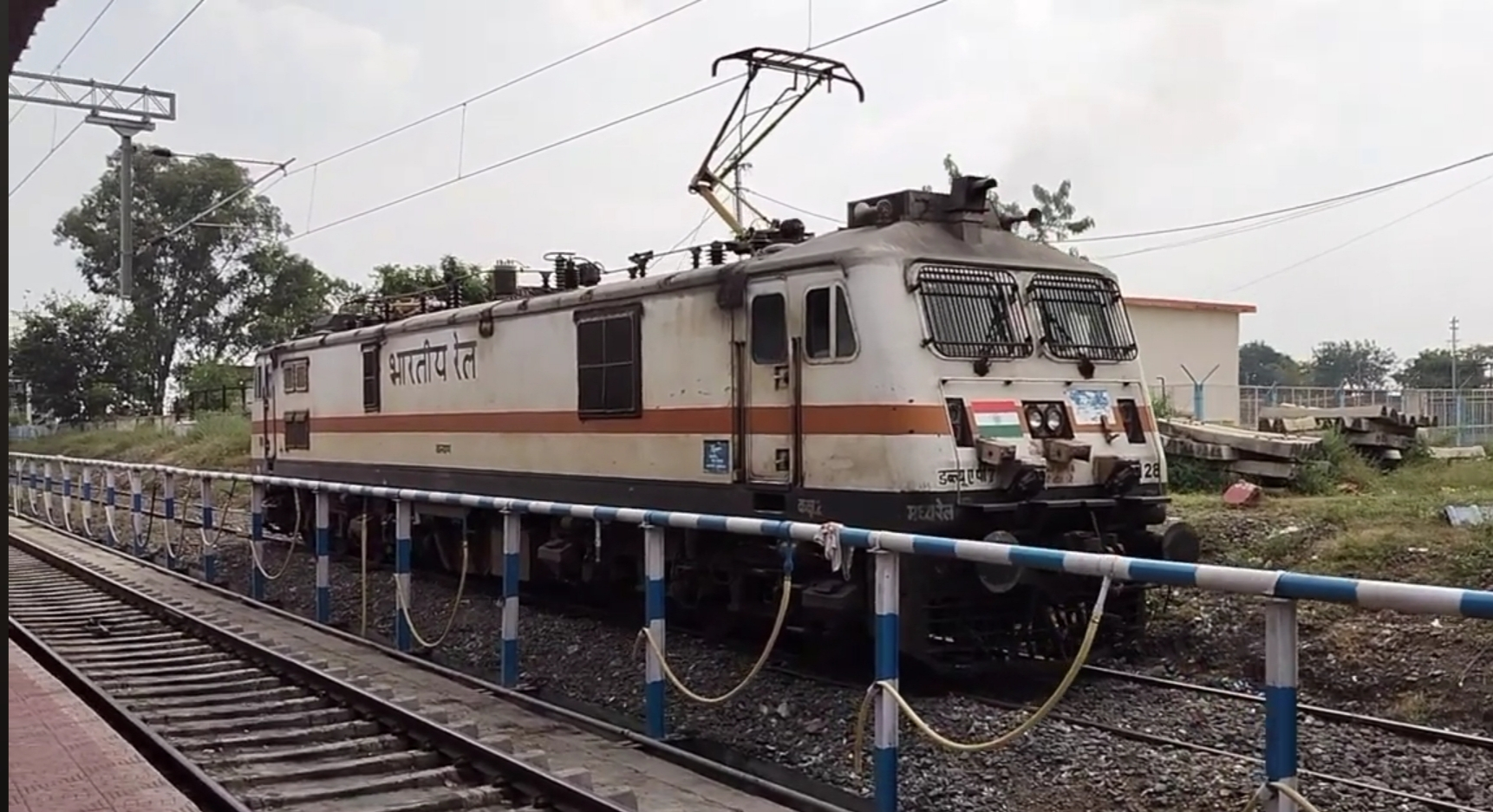
KYN WAP7 standing at Jalna railway station

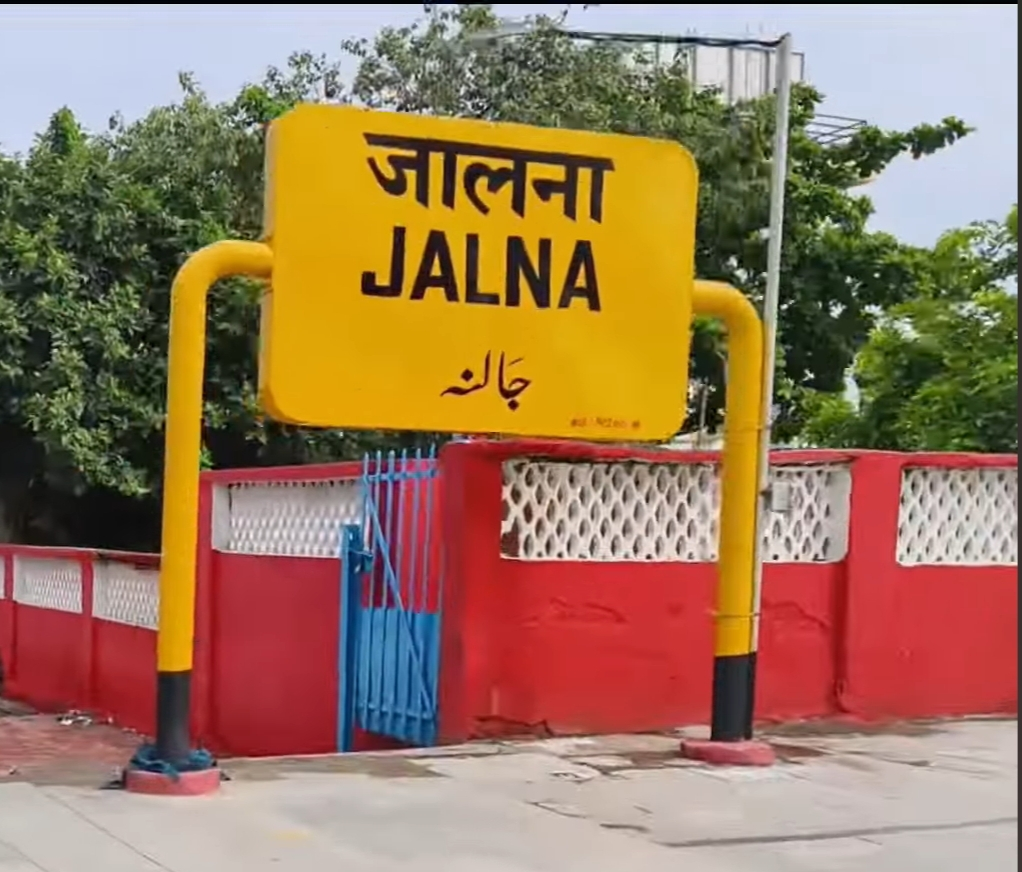
Jalna station name board

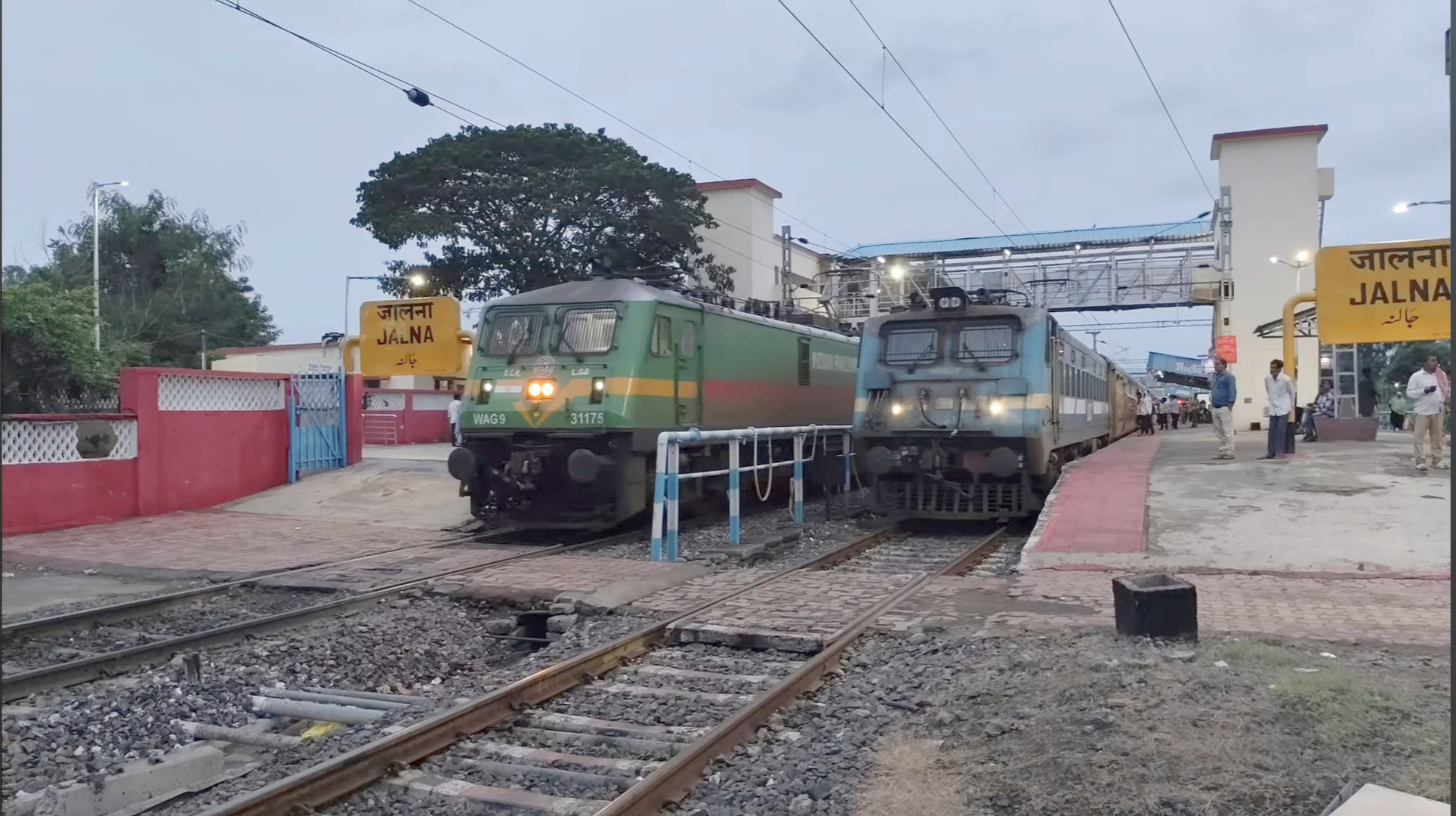
17630 Hazur Sahib Nanded-Pune Express (left) and 17661 Kacheguda-Nagarsol Express (right)

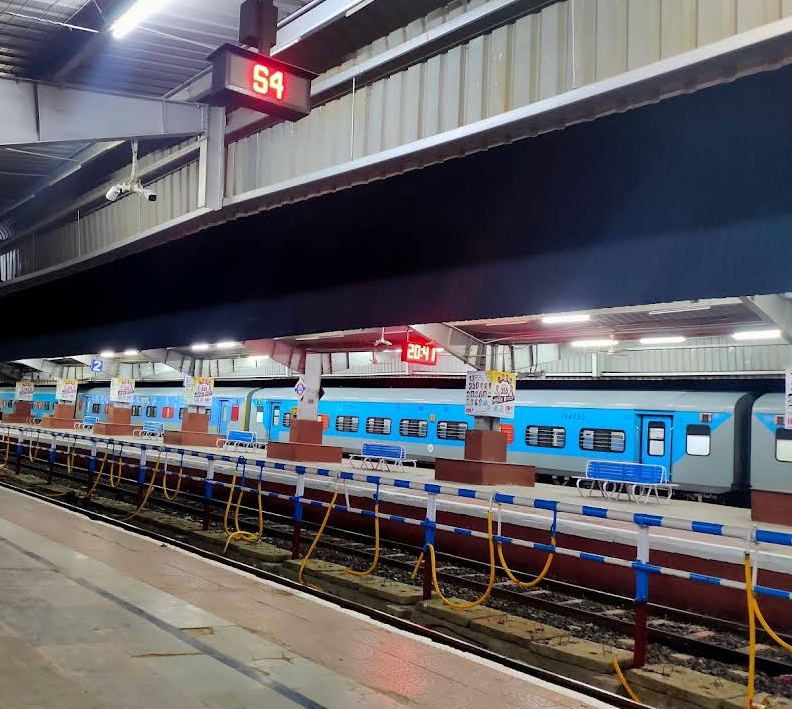
Jalna Jan Shatabdi Express

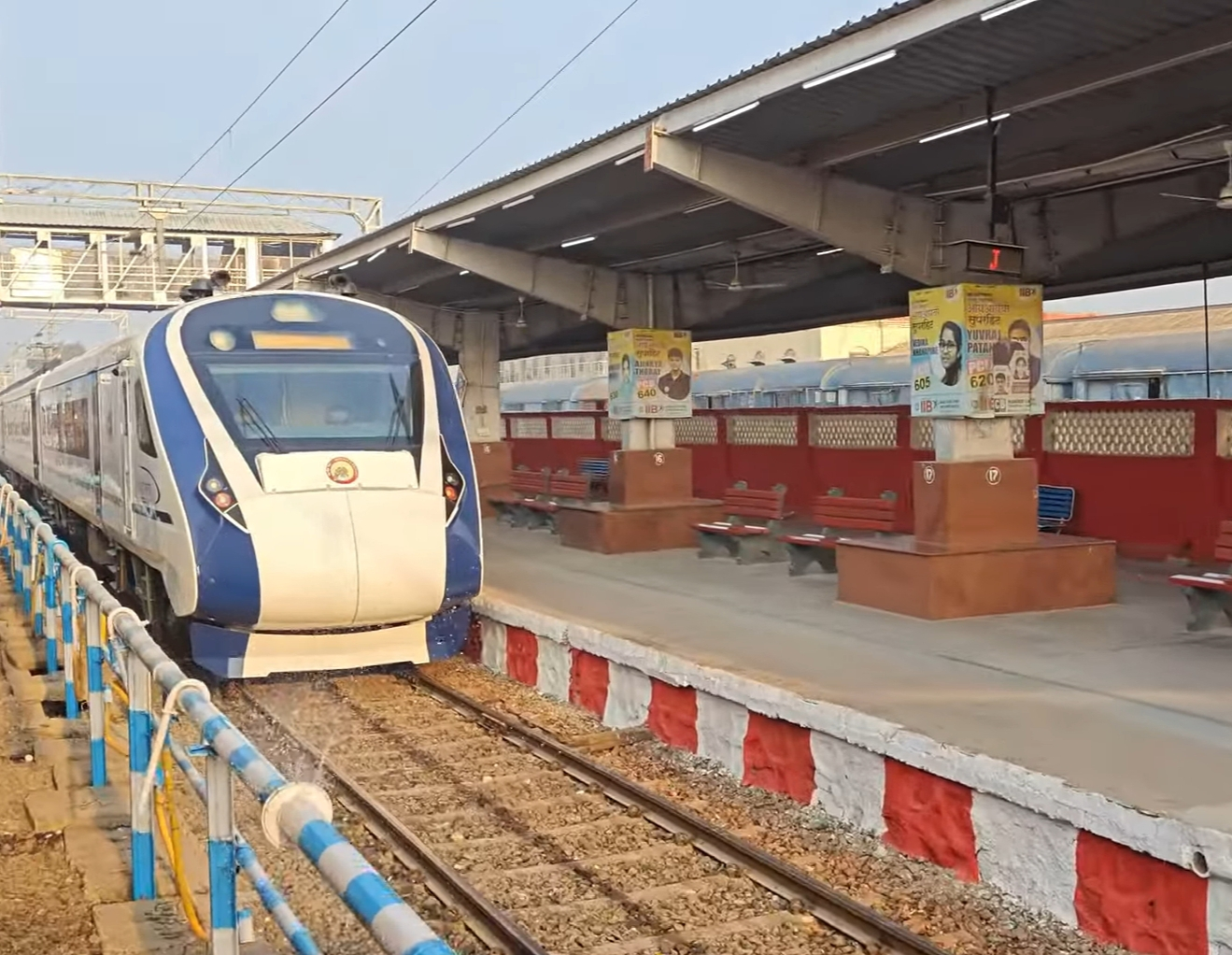
20705 Jalna-Mumbai CSMT Vande Bharat Express

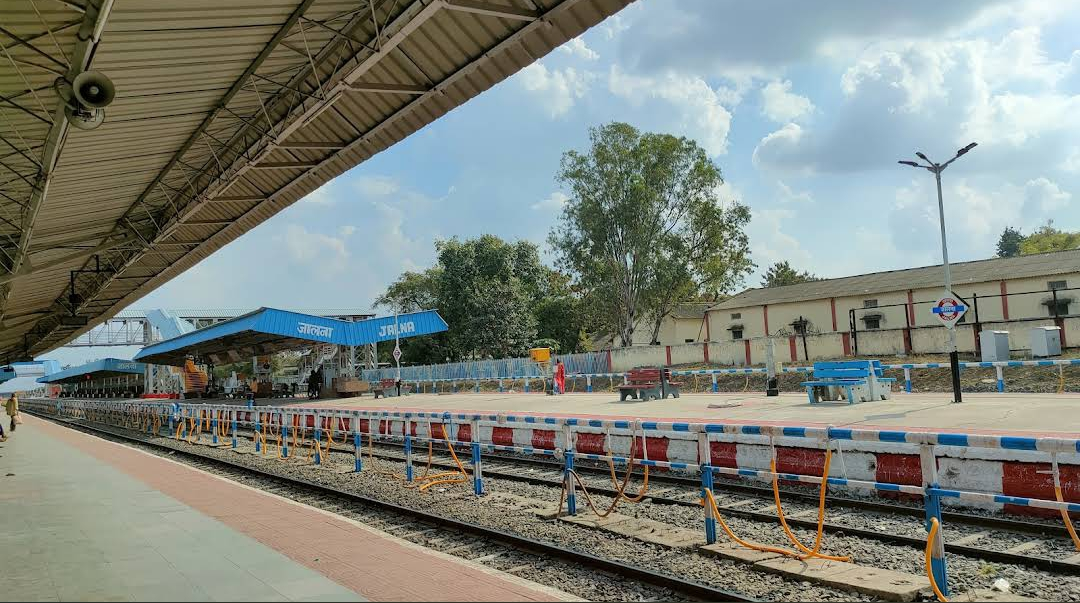
Platform view

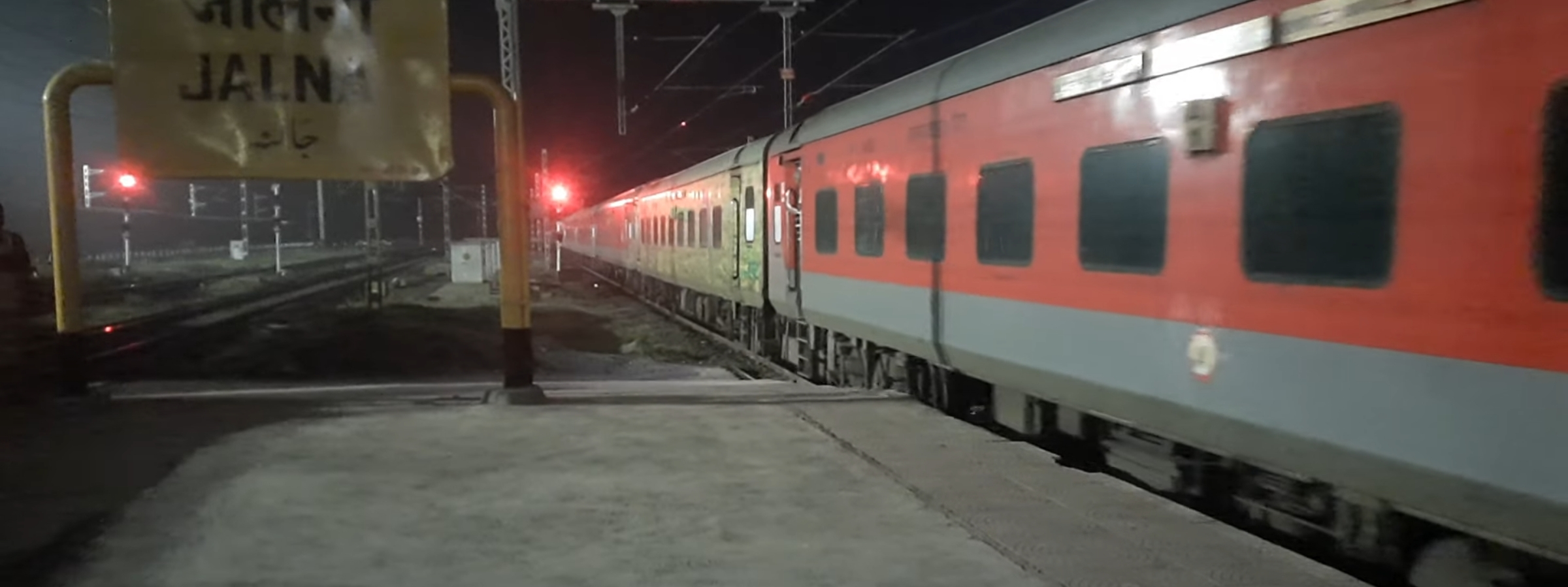
17057 Mumbai CSMT-Lingampalli Devagiri Express departing from Jalna

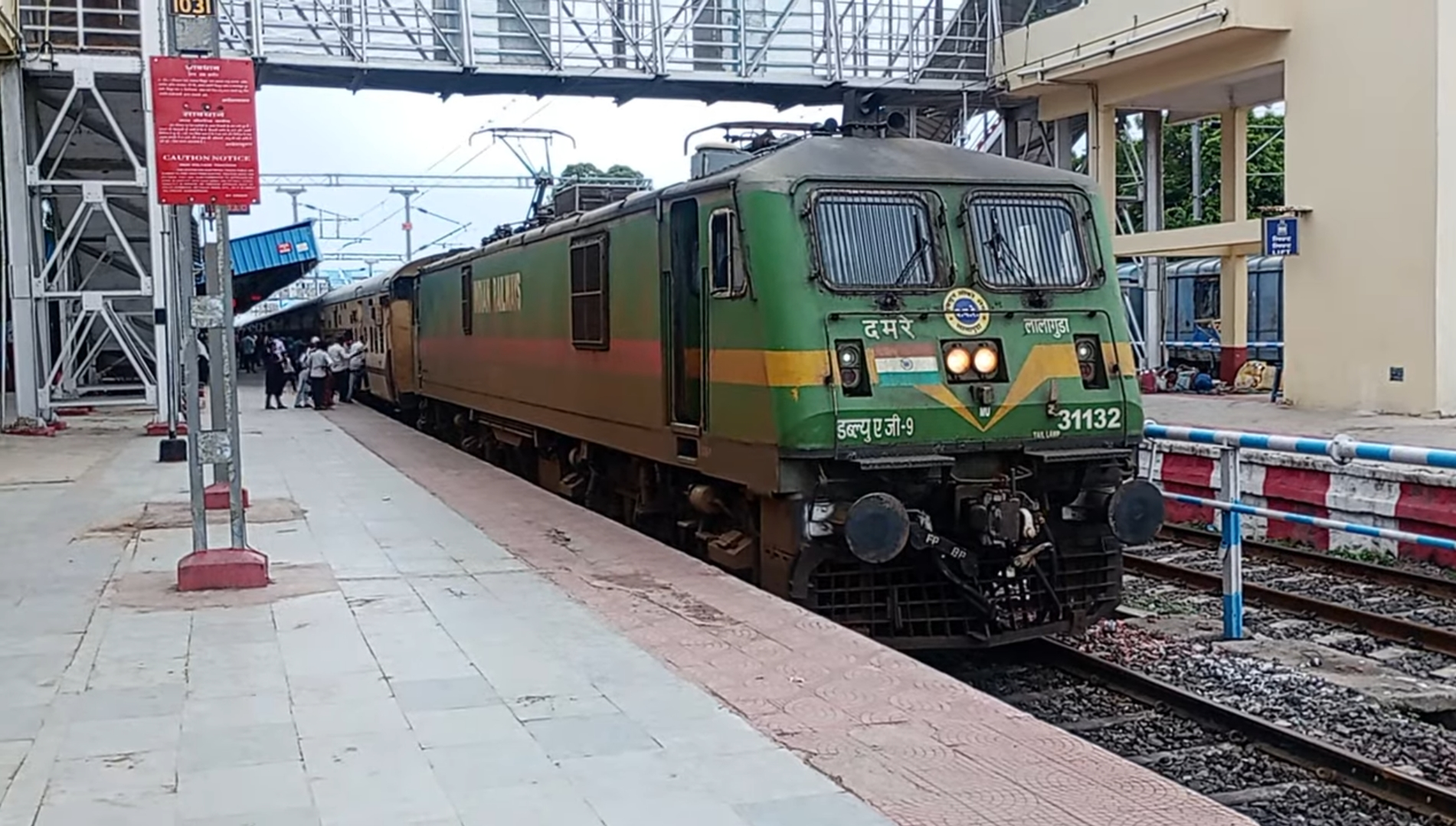
17618 Tapovan Express with LGD WAG-9 at Jalna

== List of trains ==
Train No.	Train name
07181 / 07182	Purna-Jalna Special / Jalna-Hazur Sahib Nanded Special
07491 / 07492; 07493 / 07494	Jalna-Nagarsol Demu
07651 / 07652	Jalna-Chhapra Fair Special
07777 / 07778	Hazur Sahib Nanded-Manmad Demu
11401 / 11402	Nandigram Express
11409 / 11410	Daund-Nizamabad Express / Nizamabad-Pune Express
12071 / 12072	Mumbai CSMT-Hingoli Deccan Jan Shatabdi Express
12715 / 12716	Sachkhand Express
12729 / 12730	Pune–Hazur Sahib Nanded Superfast Express
12753 / 12754	Marathwada Sampark Kranti Express
12787 / 12788	Narasapur-Nagarsol Express (via Warangal)
16003 / 16004	Chennai–Nagarsol Express
16733 / 16734	Rameswaram–Okha Express
17001 / 17002	Sainagar Shirdi–Secunderabad Express
17019 / 17020	Hisar-Hyderabad Weekly Express
17057 / 17058	Devagiri Express
17063 / 17064	Ajanta Express
17205 / 17206	Sainagar Shirdi-Kakinada Port Express
17207 / 17208	Sainagar Shirdi-Machilipatnam Express
17231 / 17232	Narasapur-Nagarsol Express (via Guntur)
17253 / 17254	Guntur-Aurangabad Express
17417 / 17418	Tirupati-Sainagar Shirdi Express
17611 / 17612	Hazur Sahib Nanded-Mumbai CSMT Rajya Rani Express
17617 / 17618	Tapovan Express
17619 / 17620	Aurangabad-Hazur Sahib Nanded Express
17621 / 17622	Aurangabad-Tirupati Weekly Express
17661 / 17662	Kacheguda-Nagarsol Express
17687 / 17688	Marathwada Express
18503 / 18504	Sainagar Shirdi-Visakhapatnam Express
20705 / 20706	Hazur Sahib Nanded–Mumbai CSMT Vande Bharat Express

== Connectivity ==
Jalna railway station is well connected by rail to other important cities like Mumbai, Aurangabad, Pune, Ahmednagar, Nashik, Nanded, Shirdi, Bhopal, Ujjain, Jabalpur, Ajmer, Jaipur, Gwalior, Agra, Mathura, Prayagraj, Varanasi, Amritsar, Ludhiana, Panipat, New Delhi, Surat, Rajkot, Dwarka, Vadodara, Ahmedabad, Hyderabad, Bidar, Secunderabad, Tirupati, Vijayawada, Visakhapatnam, Rameswaram, Madurai, Chennai.

== See also ==
- South Central Railway zone
- Nanded railway division
- Secunderabad Junction railway station
