= Nariman Nagar, Jalna =

Suburb in Jalna, India

Nariman Nagar: نریمن شہر (Urdu); नरीमान नगर (Marathi)
- Neighbourhood
- Location in Maharashtra, India
- Coordinates: 19.8316°N 75.8955°E
- Country: India
- State: Maharashtra
- District: Jalna
- City: Jalna

Government
  - Type: Municipal Corporation
  - Body: Jalna Municipal Corporation

Languages
  - Official: Marathi, Urdu
- Time zone: UTC+5:30 (IST)
- PIN: 431213/431203
- Vehicle registration: MH 21
- Lok Sabha constituency: Jalna Lok Sabha
- Vidhan Sabha constituency: Jalna Vidhan Sabha

Nariman Nagar is a suburb in Jalna, Maharashtra, India. It is belongs to Aurangabad Division.

== Connectivity ==
Nariman Nagar offers widespread connectivity to prominent parts of the city via Jalna railway station. also enhance the overall connectivity of the area.

== Infrastructure ==
Presence of Prayag Hospital, Sigedar Accidental Hospital, Niramay Hospital speak of sound healthcare infrastructure in & around the area.
