= Dharmabad =

- Town
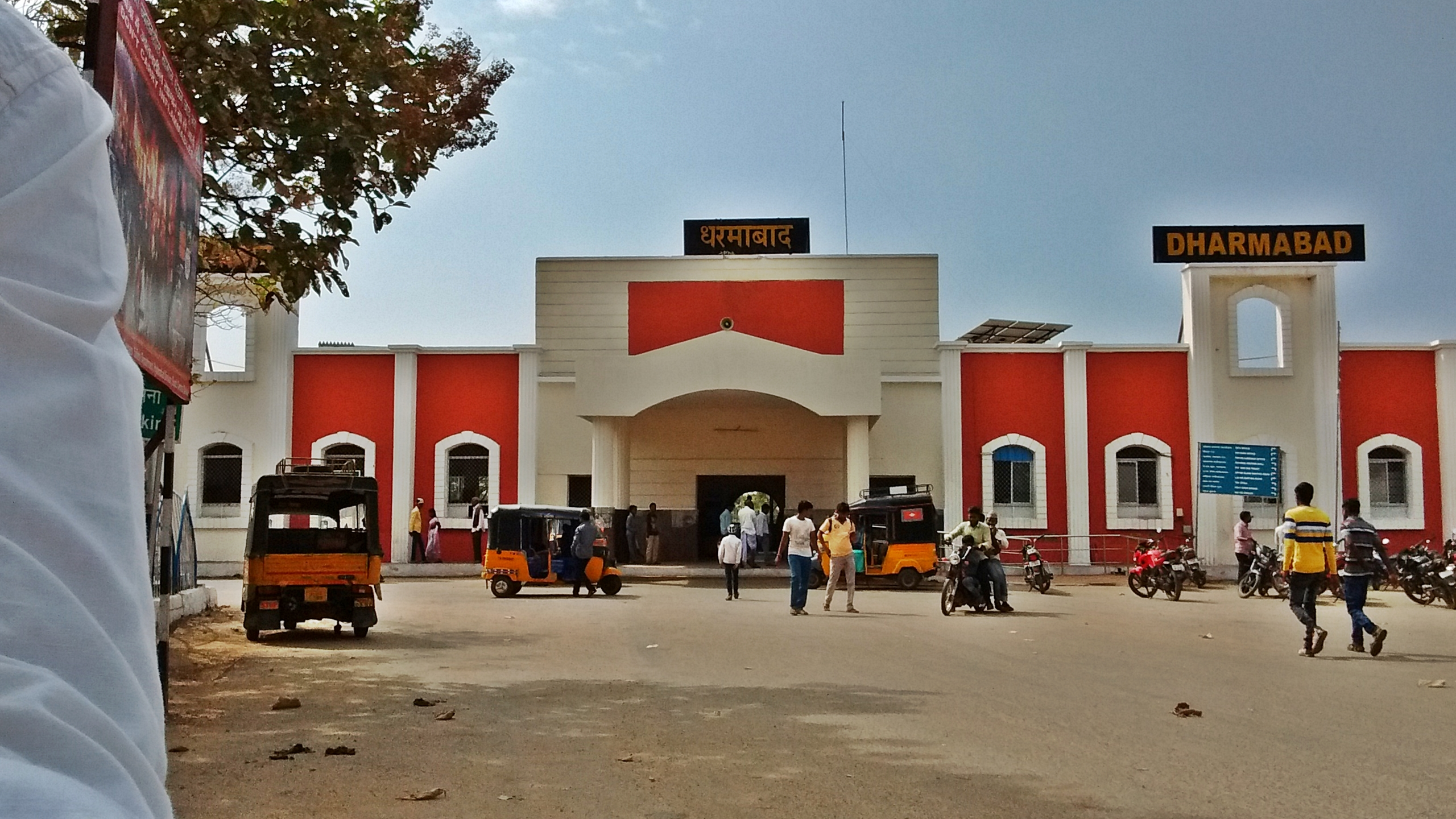
- Dharmabad railway station

- Location in Maharashtra, India Dharmabad (India)
- Coordinates: 18.9°N 77.85°E
- Country: India
- State: Maharashtra
- District: Nanded

Government
  - Type: MUNICIPAL Council

Area
  - Total: 3.583 km^{2} (1.383 sq mi)
- Elevation: 359 m (1,178 ft)

Population (2015)
  - Total: 45,196
  - Density: 12,610/km^{2} (32,670/sq mi)

Languages
  - Official: Marathi
- Time zone: UTC+5:30 (IST)
- Postal code: 431809
- Area code: 431809
- Vehicle registration: MH 26

Dharmabad is a town and a municipal council in Nanded district in the state of Maharashtra, India. It is located near the state border with Telangana. Dharmabad has an average elevation of 359 metres (1,178 ft). It is connected by railway. An industrial training institute was established in the town in 1977.

== Demographics ==
As of 2001 India census, Dharmabad had a population of 29,951. Males constitute 51% of the population and females 49%. Dharmabad has an average literacy rate of 58%, lower than the national average of 59.5%: male literacy is 69% and, female literacy is 48%. In Dharmabad, 14% of the population is under 6 years of age.

Year	Male	Female	Total Population	Change	Religion (%)							
Year	Male	Female	Total Population	Change	Hindu	Muslim	Christian	Sikhs	Buddhist	Jain	Other religions and persuasions	Religion not stated
2001	15,212	14,739	29,951	-	64.145	24.740	0.060	0.137	10.360	0.487	0.023	0.047
2011	16,919	16,822	33,741	+12.7%	61.409	27.596	0.071	0.062	10.412	0.376	0.006	0.068

== Transport ==
Dharmabad is connected with the state capital, Mumbai and the capital of neighboring state Telangana, Hyderabad and other major cities like Nizamabad, Nanded and Secunderabad by train. Dharmabad is one of the biggest revenue generating station for South Central Railway. The important trains running from are the Devgiri Express, the Ajanta Express, and the Marathwada Express. The Marathwada Express starts from Dharmabad and is also known as the High Court Express because it connects the Nanded District with Aurangabad High Court.

Dharmabad is also connected with other cities by MSRTC Bus Service. For Lord Vitthal-Rakhumai devotees a bus runs from Dharmabad to Pandharpur. As Dharmabad is located on the Maharashtra–Telangana Border, TSRTC buses also visit the town.

The nearest airport is Nanded Airport. This airport is connected all major cities of India.

== Education ==
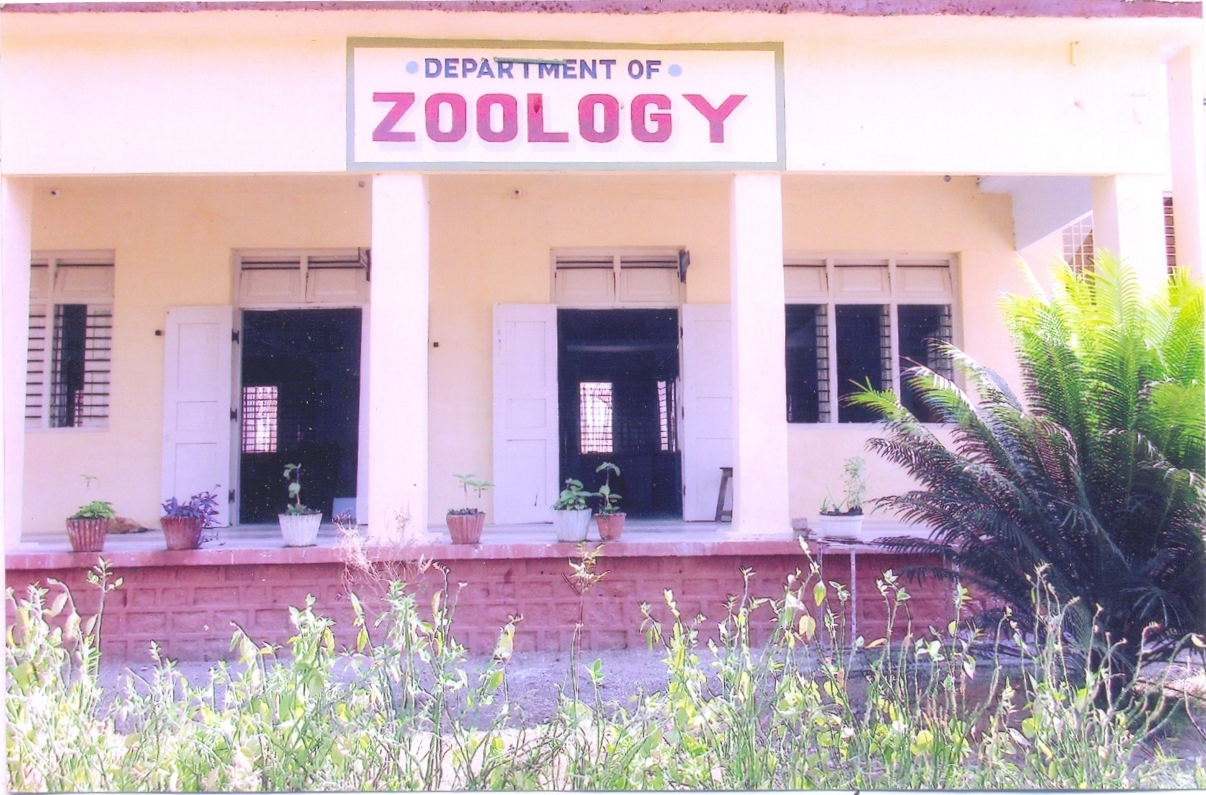
LBS College

Dharmabad is also known for its educational institutions.

Some major educational Institutions are:

1. Lal Bahadur Shastri (LBS) Jr. & Sr. College, Dharmabad
2. Hutatma Pansare Highschool(Semi-English & Marathi Medium), Dharmabad
3. Indira Gandhi Public (English medium) School, Dharmabad
4. Allama Iqbal Urdu College Dharmabad.
5. Zilha Parishad Girls Primary School
6. Zilha Parishad High school
7. Keshav Primary School
8. Saibaba Primary School
9. Gurukul Vidyalaya
10. Yasvant College Vidyalaya
11. Gov. ITI
12. Urdu school
13. Jijamata Girls High School, Dharmabad
14. Rajaram kakani Sahakar Vidya Mandir & Junior College, Dharmabad

Gov Ded college Gitanjali Public School (E/M) Wisdom Techno School (E/M) K.G.B.V. Urdu High School. Urdu Primary School. kasturba gandhi girls school, Dharmabad. And green field public school

== Major colleges ==
Dharmabad provides bachelor's degree courses institution are as follows:

1. Lal Bahadur Shastri Mahavidhyalaya, Dharmabad
