= Secunderabad–Manmad line =

Railway line in India

Secunderabad–Manmad Line
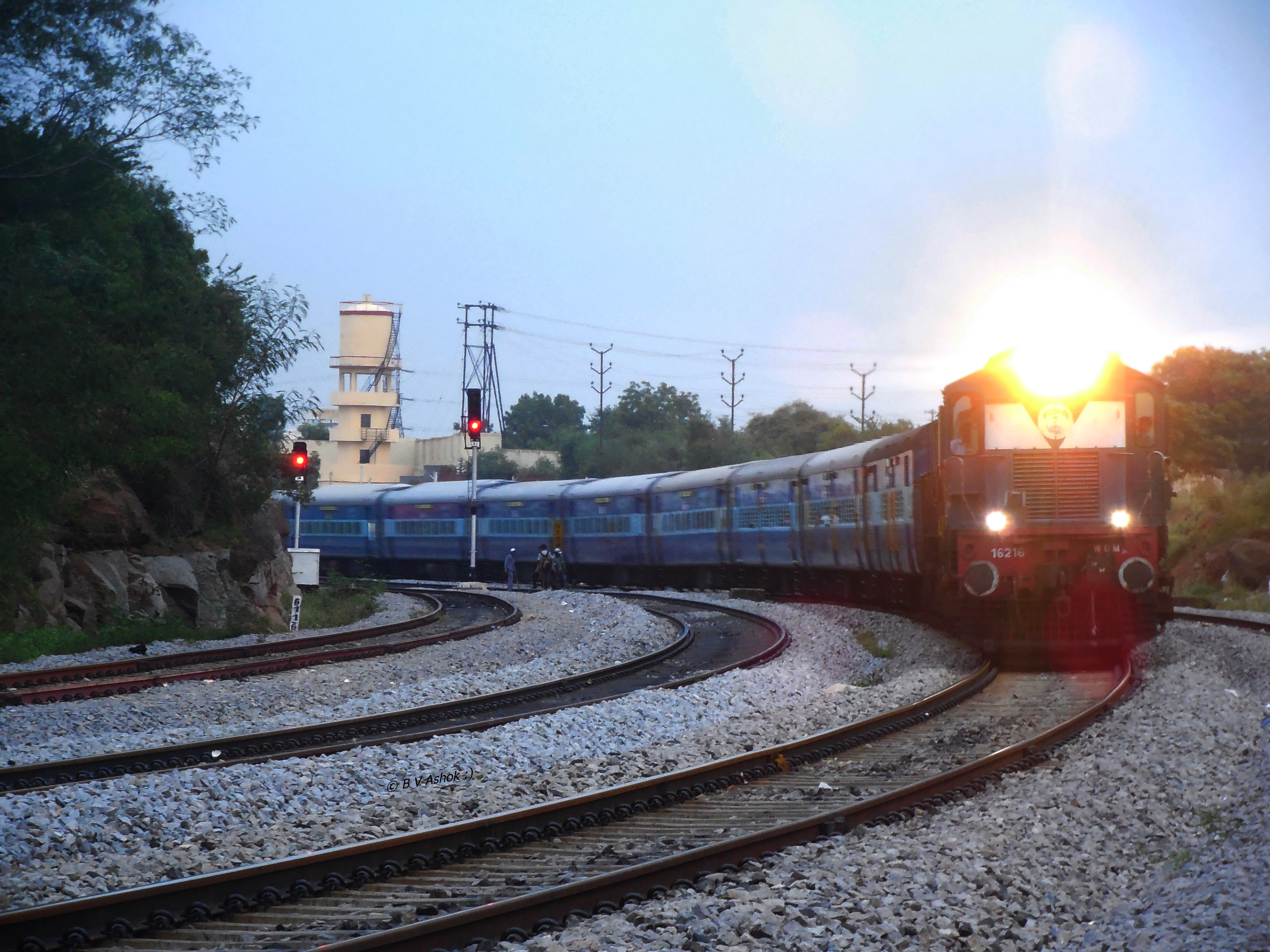
- Ajanta Express, daily train between Secunderabad–Manmad

Overview
- Status: Operational
- Owner: Indian Railways
- Locale: Telangana, Maharashtra
- Termini: Secunderabad Junction; Manmad Junction
- Stations: 85 (approx)

Service
- Operator: South Central Railway

History
- Opened: 1905; 121 years ago
- Electrification: Yes

Technical
- Track length: 621 km (386 mi)
- Track gauge: 5 ft 6 in (1,676 mm) broad gauge
- Electrification: Yes
- Operating speed: up to 100 km/h (62 mph)
Route map
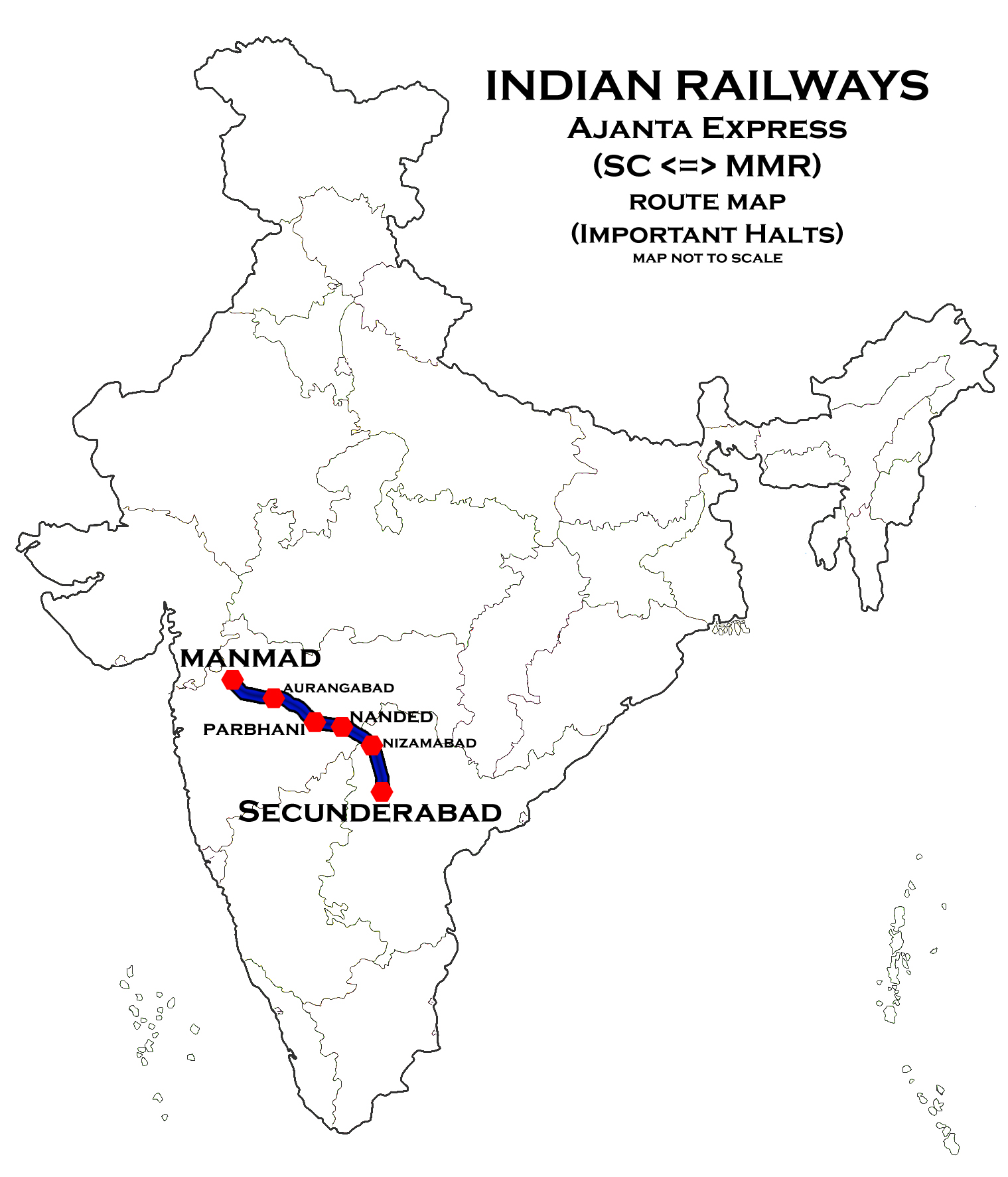
- Source:Google Maps, Ajanta Express, Aurangabad Hyderabad Passenger, Nizamabad Bodhan Passenger, Purna Akola Passenger, Nandigram Express, Nizamabad Karimnagar DEMU, Lingampet Jagityal DEMU,

Secunderabad–Manmad is an important railway line connecting the states of Telangana and Maharashtra. It is administered by South Central Railway and was formerly known as Hyderabad–Manmad railway line (built by NGSR) and Godavari Valley railway for some period. as of 2016, this line is single broad gauged, and electrification is under progress. In March 2023, South Central Railway announced the electrification of an additional 75 km on the line (Nizamabad-Kamareddy and Jankampet-Basar)

The line starts at Secunderabad Junction and ends at Manmad Junction and has around 85 railway stations between them. The major stations on the route are Secunderabad, Kamareddy, Nizamabad, Basar, Mudkhed, Nanded, Purna, Parbhani, Selu, Partur, Jalna, Chhatrapati Sambhajinagar, Nagarsol and Manmad.

== History ==
The Nizam of Hyderabad ruled over the Deccan region from the 18th century and under his reign, the railway line between Secunderabad and Manmad was constructed in 1905 by the Nizam's Guaranteed State Railway. The Secunderabad-Mudkhed portion of the line was approved for doubling in 2023.

== Operations ==
The maximum and average operational speed of an express train from Secunderabad Jn. to Manmad Jn.

| From | To | Distance in km | Avg speed km/h | Max speed km/h |
|---|---|---|---|---|
| Secunderabad | Nizamabad | 161 | 70 | 110 |
| Nizamabad | Parbhani Jn | 170 | 70 | 110 |
| Parbhani Jn | Manmad | 291 | 60 | 100 |

== Intermediate branch lines ==
| Branch | Length |
|---|---|
| Nizamabad–Peddapalli | 177 km (110 mi) |
| Jankampet–Bodhan | 20 km (12 mi) |
| Mudkhed–Majri | 263 km (163 mi) |
| Purna-Akola | 208 km (129 mi) |
| Parbhani-Parli Vaijnath | 64 km (40 mi) |
| Kothapalli-Manoharabad | 151 km (94 mi) |

== Passing trains ==
Some of the trains that pass from this line are

| Train number | Train name | Origin | Destination |
|---|---|---|---|
| 17063/64 | Ajanta Express | Kacheguda | Manmad |
| 17205/06 | Sainagar Shirdi–Kakinada Port Express | Kakinada City | Shirdi |
| 17405/06 | Krishna Express | Tirupathi | Adilabad |
| 17617/18 | Tapovan Express | Mumbai CST | Hazur Sahib Nanded |
| 17057/58 | Devagiri Express | Lingampalli | Mumbai CST |
| 17639/40 | Intercity Express | Kachiguda | Narkhed |
| 17613/14 | Panvel-Hazur Sahib Nanded Express via Latur and Pune | Nanded | Panvel |
| 57689 | Nizamabad–Kacheguda DEMU | Nizamabad | Kacheguda |
| 51422/21 | Nizamabad–Pune Passenger | Nizamabad | Pune |
| 57557 | Nizamabad–Nanded Passenger | Nizamabad | Nanded |
| 51433 | Nizamabad–Pandharpur Passenger | Nizamabad | Pandharpur |
| 57687 | Nizamabad–Kacheguda DEMU | Nizamabad | Kacheguda |
| 12787/88 | Nagarsol–Narsapur Superfast Express | Nagarsol | Narsapur (via Warangal) |
| 57474 | Bodhan–Kacheguda Passenger | Bodhan–NZB | Kacheguda railway station |
| 18510/09 | Visakhapatnam–Hazur Sahib Nanded Superfast Express | Nanded | Visakhapatnam |
| 18309/10 | Nagavali Express | Sambalpur | Nanded |
| 12765/66 | Tirupati-Amravati Express | Amravati | Tirupati |
| 12729/30 | Pune-Hazur Sahib Nanded Superfast Express | Pune | Nanded |
| 19301/02 | Dr. Ambedkar Nagar (Mhow)–Yesvantpur Weekly Express | Dr. Ambedkar Nagar | Yesvantpur |
| 17232/31 | Narasapur-Nagarsol Express | Nagarsol | Narsapur (via Guntur) |
| 16003/04 | Chennai–Nagarsol Express | Chennai | Nagarsol |
| 57561/62 | Kacheguda–Manmad Passenger | Kacheguda | Manmad |
| 57594 | Nanded–Medchal Passenger | Nanded | Medchal |
| 18504/03 | Sainagar Shirdi–Visakhapatnam Express | Sainagar Shirdi | Visakhapatnam |
| 11401/02 | Nandigram Express | Balharshah | Mumbai CST |
| 12715/16 | Sachkhand Express | Amritsar | Nanded |
| 12071/72 | Mumbai CSMT–Hingoli Deccan Jan Shatabdi Express | Mumbai CSMT | Hingoli |
| 17687/88 | Marathwada Express | Dharmabad | Manmad |
| 20705/20706 | Hazur Sahib Nanded–Mumbai CSMT Vande Bharat Express | Nanded | Mumbai CSMT railway station |
| 17605/17606 | Hyderabad Jodhpur Express | Kacheguda | Jodhpur |
| 12719/12720 | Hyderabad–Jaipur Meenakshi Express | Hyderabad | Jaipur Junction railway station |
| 17019/17020 | Hisar–Hyderabad Weekly Express | Hisar Junction railway station | Hyderabad |
| 19714/19713 | Kurnool Jaipur express | Kurnool City railway station | Jaipur Junction railway station |

== See also ==
- Nizam's Guaranteed State Railway
