= Nagarsol =

- Village
- Nagarsol in Maharashtra
- Coordinates: 20.100°N 74.543°E
- Country: India
- State: Maharashtra
- District: Nashik district
- Taluka: Yeola
- PIN code: 423403

Nagarsol, sometimes spelled Nagarsul, is a small Indian village in located in Maharashtra, with some housing colonies built around railway station, a rural hospital, a small public bus stand and an English medium school apart from couple of vernacular schools. It falls under Nashik district under Yeola Taluka. Nagarsol is 9.9 km far from its Taluka head office town of Yeola and at a distance of 80.4 km from its District town Nashik.

== Railway station ==
Nagarsol railway station-cum-terminus is managed by South Central Railway. Station code is NSL. It is located at a distance of 25 km from Manmad Junction. Nagarsol is located at a distance of 44 km away from famous pilgrimage center of Shirdi. The trains coming from South terminate here. From Nagarsol transport is available to Shridi which is one hour drive.

Nagarsol falls as a station under Secunderabad–Manmad line, which was originally built by Hyderabad–Godavari Valley Railways owned by Nizam's Guaranteed State Railway in year 1900 by Nizam of Hyderabad.

Some of the trains which terminate at Nagarsol are:

- Nagarsol–Nanded Passenger
- Narasapur–Nagarsol Express (via Warangal) 17214
- Narasapur–Nagarsol Express (via Guntur) 17232
- Chennai–Nagarsol Express
- Jalna-Nagarsol DEMU
- Nagarsol–Kacheguda Express
