= Aurangabad railway station =

Railway Station in Maharashtra, India

General information
- Other names: Chhatrapati Sambhajinagar railway station (official)
- Location: Station Rd, Padampura, Aurangabad 431001, Maharashtra; India
- Coordinates: 19°52′N 75°19′E
- Elevation: 1,831 feet (558 m)
- System: Regional rail and Light rail station
- Owner: Indian Railways
- Operator: South Central Railway
- Line: Secunderabad–Manmad
- Platforms: 5 (3 in use for passengers.)
- Tracks: 8

Construction
- Structure type: At grade
- Parking: Available
- Accessible: Yes

Other information
- Status: Active
- Station code: CPSN
- Zone(s): South Central Railway
- Division(s): Nanded

History
- Electrified: Yes
Location
- Location within Maharashtra
- Interactive map

Aurangabad railway station, officially Chhatrapati Sambhajinagar railway station (code CPSN), is a railway station located on the Kacheguda–Manmad section which mainly services Aurangabad City.

== History ==
Aurangabad railway station was opened in 1900. It was built under the 7th Nizam of Hyderabad Mir Osman Ali Khan as part of the Godavari Valley Railway Company under the Nizam's Guaranteed State Railway. In 1876 work began during the regime of 6th Nizam Mir Mahbub Ali Khan. The first line between Hyderabad and Bezwada was constructed.

The first broad-gauge line between Secunderabad and Wadi was constructed in 1885. Hyderabad–Manmad line work completed in 1900. Hyderabad–Jaipur metre-gauge line work started and was completed in 1906.

In 1950 Nizam's Guaranteed Railway was nationalised and merged with the Indian Railways. In 1992, 94-metre-gauge work of Secunderabad–Manmad line was completed.

Aurangabad railway station has been renamed as Chhatrapati Sambhajinagar on 25 October 2025, with a new station code CPSN. The former station code AWB have since been retired. The signs on the platforms have also been changed.

== Connectivity ==
Aurangabad railway station has rail connectivity with Mumbai, Delhi, Hyderabad, Chennai Central, Nizamabad, Nanded, Nagpur, Nashik, Pune, Yadgir, Raichur, Hyderabad, Secunderabad, Ahmedabad, Ahmednagar, Visakhapatnam. The Hazur Sahib Nanded - Mumbai CSMT Vande Bharat Express is the current fastest train connecting it with Mumbai with an average speed of 63 km/h. The Sachkhand Express connects it with the national capital of India, New Delhi (NDLS) with an average journey time of 23 hours and 35 minutes .

== See also ==
- Jalna railway station
- Manmad Junction railway station
