= Manmad =

Manmad Manmad
- Town
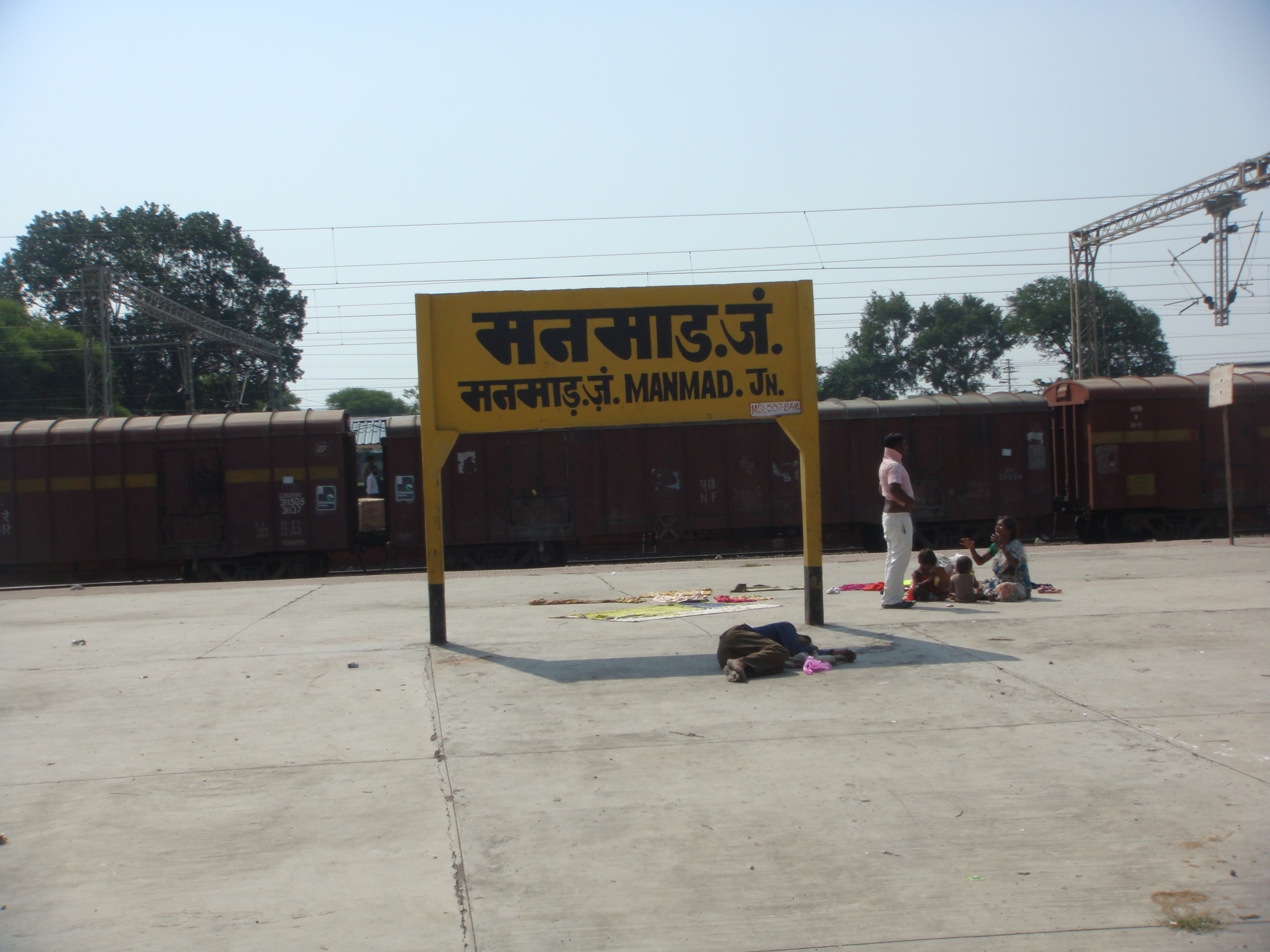
- Manmad railway sign board
- Nickname: आपलं मनमाड
- Location in Maharashtra, India
- Coordinates: 20.251°N 74.439°E
- Country: India
- State: Maharashtra
- District: Nashik
- Elevation: 580 m (1,900 ft)

Population (2011)
  - Total: 80,058 (Census 2,011)

Language
  - Official: Marathi
- Time zone: UTC+5:30 (IST)
- PIN: 423104
- Telephone code: 02591
- Vehicle registration: MH 15, MH 41

Manmad ( [mənmaːɖ]) is a town in Nandgaon tehsil, Nashik district in Maharashtra, India. It is the third largest city in the district, with a population of 80,058 As of 2011. Though it has a larger area and population than most tehsils in the district, it does not have a tehsil office.

Manmad houses some of the largest grain storage warehouses in Asia, which are administered by the Food Corporation of India as well as the offices of petroleum companies such as Bharat Petroleum, Hindustan Petroleum and Indian Oil. Manmad also houses a popular Sikh Gurudwara. Manmad is one of the largest markets for onion producing farmers after Lasalgaon; many farmers from nearby villages sell their farm produce in Manmad to wholesale traders, who in turn sell it in Mumbai. The Central Railway Engineering workshop at Manmad, which constructs and maintains railway bridges for central railways, marked 100 years of operation in December 2005. The Centralized Engineering Workshop is under the direct control of Chief Engineer, Central Railway, Mumbai. This workshop undertakes fabrication of steel structural items, including bridge girders; approximately 1160 employees work in the Engineering Workshop.

Bharat Petroleum has erected a station near Manmad that collects petroleum products from BPCL & HPCL refineries and carries them to the interior parts of Maharashtra.

== Manmad railway station ==
Manmad Junction railway station is a major railway junction on the Central Railway line. A majority of Manmad's population is employed by Central Railway and Food Corporation of India. Four railway lines converge at Manmad, one each from Bhusawal, Daund–Pune, Secunderabad–Manmad and most importantly from Mumbai. Manmad is a crucial junction for those who want to travel to Shirdi, Pune, Mumbai, Hyderabad, Tirupati, Konkan, Marathwada and Bangalore. This station served as an important interconnection between Nizam State Railway (then metre-gauge railway) and GIP Railway till 1948.

== Transport ==
Manmad lies on State Highway 10. It was an important link for Holkars to deal with Peshwas at Pune, and it was an important link for Peshwas to enter Northern India, especially Delhi. Other roads link with Chandwad and Nandgaon.

== Geography ==
Manmad is located at 20.25°N 74.45°E. It has an average elevation of 580 metres (1902 feet).

== Demographics ==
According to the 2011 Indian census, Manmad has a population of 80,058. Males constitute 52% of the population and females 48%. Manmad has an average literacy rate of 75%, higher than the national average of 59.5%: male literacy is 81%, and female literacy is 69%. In Manmad, 13% of the population is under 6 years of age.
