= Manmad Junction railway station =

Railway junction station in Nashik, Maharashtra

Manmad Junction
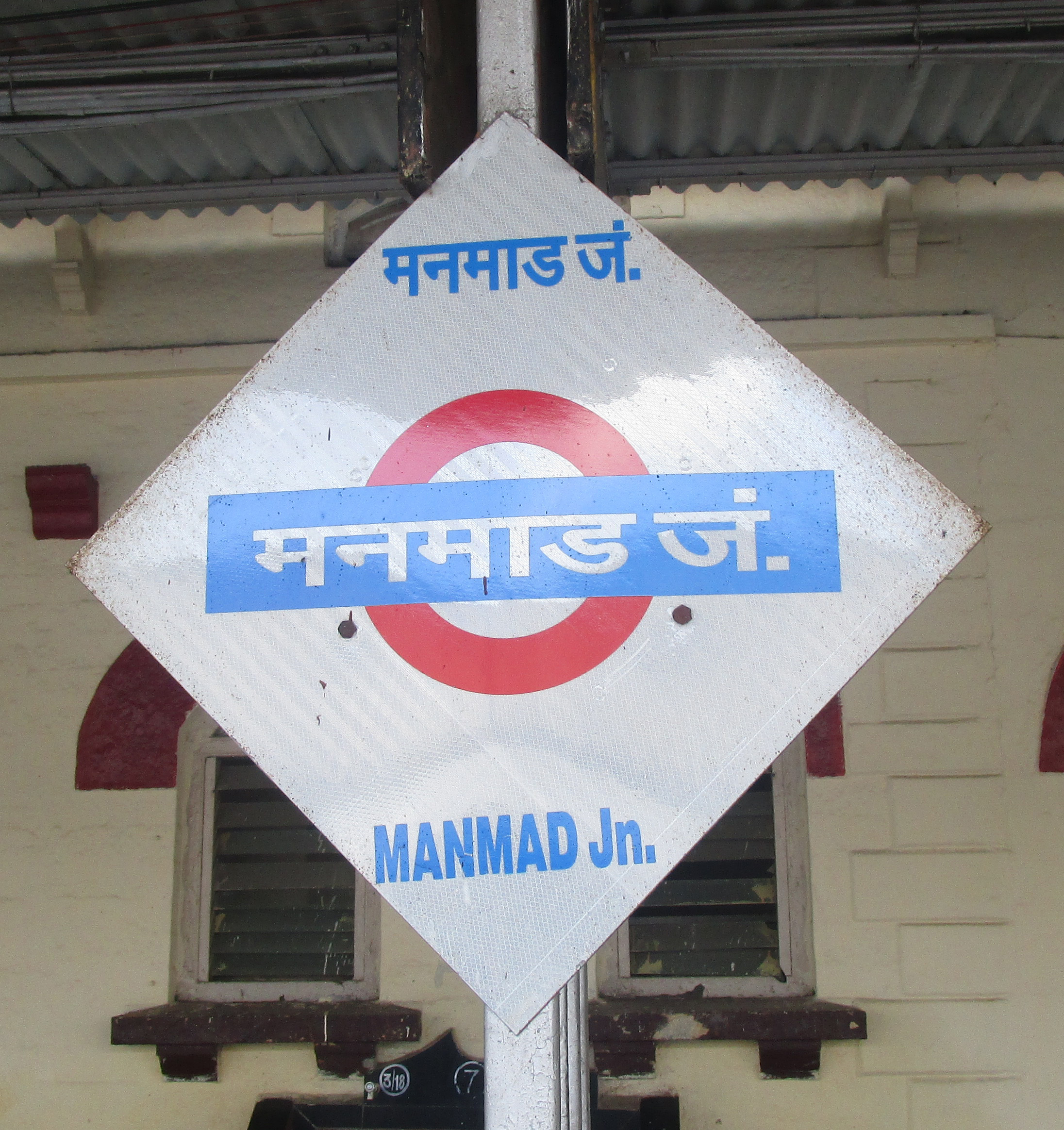

General information
- Location: Manmad, Nashik District, Maharashtra; India
- Coordinates: 20°14′59″N 74°26′18″E
- Elevation: 557.84 metres (1,830.2 ft)
- System: Indian Railways station
- Owner: Indian Railways
- Operator: Central Railway zone
- Lines: Bhusawal–Kalyan section, Howrah–Nagpur–Mumbai line, Howrah–Prayagraj–Mumbai line, Secunderabad–Manmad line, Daund-Manmad line
- Platforms: 6

Construction
- Structure type: At grade
- Parking: Available
- Accessible: Yes

Other information
- Status: Active
- Station code: MMR
- Zone(s): Central Railway
- Division(s): Bhusawal

History
- Opened: 1866; 160 years ago
- Electrified: 1968–69
- Former names: Great Indian Peninsula Railway
Location
- Location within Maharashtra
- Interactive map

Manmad Junction Railway Station (station code: MMR) is a Central Railway junction in India, serving the town of Manmad in the Nashik district of Maharashtra. It is one of the Central Railways' major stations, connecting Manmad with many major cities in the region, including Mumbai and Pune. Around 51 trains travel between Mumbai and Manmad railway stations every week.

== History ==
The first 21 miles of the rail ran from Bombay towards Manmad Junction railway station all the way to Thane station. The inaugural train pulled into Thane station from Bombay on April 16, 1853. The celebrations declared this a public holiday with garrison band firing of salutes. On May 1, 1854, the Bombay to Thane line of the Great Indian Peninsula Railway was extended to the Kalyan railway station.
The Bhusawal Junction railway station was open for traffic in the mid-1860s, followed by the track extension to Khandwa in 1866 and to Nagpur in 1867, resulting in the construction of Manmad Junction railway station in 1866.
In 1890, the Nizam's Guaranteed State Railway began service on the 391 miles (629 km) from the city of Hyderabad to Manmad Junction.

== Infrastructure ==
The Central Railway Engineering Workshop is in Manmad. Girder bridges are fabricated in the structural yard, in addition to other manufacturing activities taking place in the general yard and workshop. Manmad is a transport hub for various industries making it predominantly a railway town. The largest grain storage warehouse in Asia, administered by the Food Corporation of India is also in Manmad. It is home to offices of petroleum companies like Bharat Petroleum, Hindustan Petroleum, and Indian Oil.

== Development of the station ==
The railways in the Niphad-Manmad–Nandgaon sector were electrified and the locomotives (diesel and electromotive diesel) were converted to use electricity between the period 1968 and 1969. Manmad has an electric locomotive trip shed to supply and control the trains. Free high-speed Wi-Fi has been enabled since 2017. Manmad Junction Railway Station is among the top-100 most-booked stations within the Indian Railways system.

The Central Railway has plans for double line between Daund and Manmad.

== Services ==
The following trains stop here:

- Cstm Garibrath (02187) Stop time 5 mins
- Jbp Garibrath S (02188) Stop time 5 mins
- Hyb Aii Special (07020) Stop time 20 mins

== Connections ==
=== Airports ===
Gandhinagar Airport is 87.8 km (54.6 mi) away from the station. The Chatrapati Shivaji Airport in Mumbai is 263 km (163 mi) from Manmad Junction.

=== Ground ===
The station is about 2 km (1.2 mi) from Manmad Bus Stand and 57.5 km (35.7 mi) from Shirdi.

More than 50 trains a week connect Mumbai CST to Manmad, depending on the weather.

== Nearby landmarks ==
The distance to Ankai Fort is 7.8 km (4.8 mi) while to Tankai Fort is 10.6 km (6.6 mi) from the junction. These forts are popular among hikers. The ancient temple of Agastya Rishi is located on the outskirts of the city.

Preceding station	Indian Railways	Following station
Panavedi towards ?	Central Railway zone Howrah–Nagpur–Mumbai line, Howrah–Allahabad–Mumbai line, New Delhi–Bhopal–Mumbai line	Summit towards ?
Nandgaon towards ?	Central Railway zone Manmad–Daund branch line	Ankai Killa towards ?
Nandgaon towards ?	South Central Railway zone Manmad–Purna branch line	Ankai towards ?
