= Lokmanya Tilak Terminus–Hazur Sahib Nanded Express =

Discontinued Indian Train

Overview
- Service type: Express
- First service: 12 March 2014; 12 years ago
- Current operator: Central Railway zone

Route
- Termini: Lokmanya Tilak Terminus (LTT); Hazur Sahib Nanded (NED)
- Stops: 12
- Distance travelled: 728 km (452 mi)
- Average journey time: 16 hours 40 minutes
- Service frequency: Weekly (Note: Runs one day in a week on Wednesday for every direction.)
- Train number: 11011/11012

On-board services
- Classes: 3 AC 3 Tier, Sleeper 3 Tier, Unreserved
- Seating arrangements: Yes
- Sleeping arrangements: Yes
- Catering facilities: No
- Observation facilities: Rake sharing with 11017/18 Lokmanya Tilak Terminus–Karaikal Weekly Express
- Entertainment facilities: No
- Baggage facilities: below the seats

Technical
- Rolling stock: 2
- Track gauge: 1,676 mm (5 ft 6 in)
- Operating speed: 44 km/h (27 mph)

Lokmanya Tilak Terminus–Hazur Sahib Nanded Express was an intercity train of the Indian Railways connecting Lokmanya Tilak Terminus Kurla in Maharashtra and Hazur Sahib Nanded of Maharashtra. It was being operated with 11011/11012 train numbers on a weekly basis. This now discontinued by South Central Railways.

== Service ==
The 11011/Mumbai LTT–Hazur Sahib Nanded (Weekly) Express has an average speed of 44 km/h and covers 728 km in 16 hrs 40 mins. 11012/Hazur Sahib Nanded–Mumbai LTT Weekly Express has an average speed of 44 km/h and covers 728 km in 17 hrs 15 mins. The maximum permissible speed is 110 km/h from PUNE TO KWD. without halting (through) DAUND JN.

== Route and halts ==
- Lokmanya Tilak Terminus
- Thane
- Kalyan Junction
- Karjat
- Lonavala
- Pune Junction
- Kurduvadi Junction
- Barshi Town
- Dharashiv
- Latur
- Latur Road Junction
- Parli Vaijnath
- Parbhani Junction
- Purna Junction
- Hazur Sahib Nanded

== Coach composition ==
The train consists of 22 LHB-type coaches:

- 1 AC II Tier
- 4 AC III Tier
- 12 Sleeper coaches
- 3 General
- 2 luggage cum generator car (EOG)

== Traction ==
Both trains are hauled by a Kalyan Loco Shed-based WAP-7 electric locomotive from Kurla to Nanded.

== Direction reversal ==
The train reverses its direction 2 times:

- Parli Vaijnath
- Latur Road Junction
