= Hyderabad–Purna Passenger =

Train in India

Hyderabad - Purna Passenger
Overview
- Service type: Passenger
- Current operator(s): South Central Railway

Route
- Termini: Hyderabad Deccan (HYB); Purna Junction (PAU)
- Stops: 45
- Distance travelled: 433 km (269 mi)
- Average journey time: 13h 10m
- Service frequency: Daily (Note: Runs seven days in a week for every direction.)
- Train number(s): 57547/57548

On-board services
- Class(es): Unreserved
- Seating arrangements: Yes
- Sleeping arrangements: No
- Catering facilities: No
- Entertainment facilities: No
- Baggage facilities: No

Technical
- Rolling stock: 2
- Track gauge: 5 ft 6 in (1,676 mm)
- Operating speed: 33 km/h (21 mph) average with halts
Route map
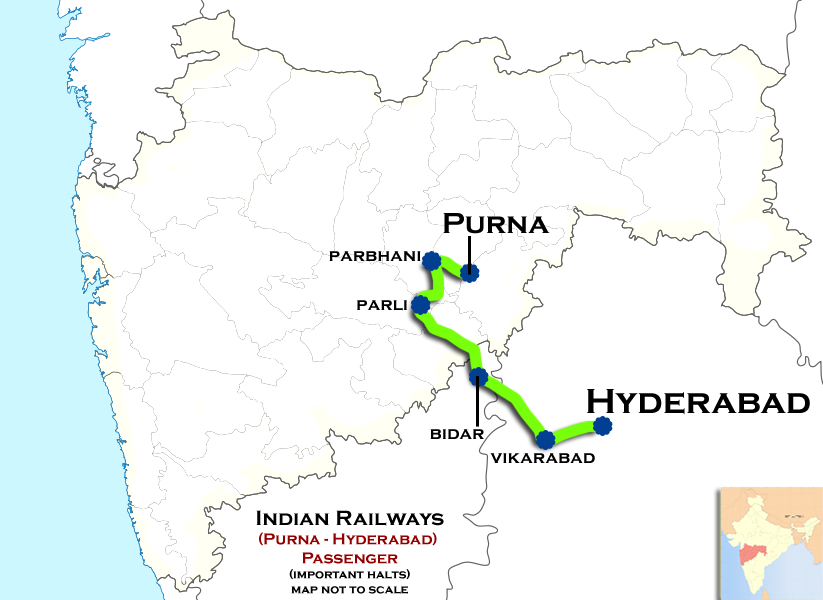

Hyderabad - Purna Passenger is a passenger train belonging to South Central Railway zone that runs between Hyderabad Deccan and Purna Junction. It is currently being operated with 57547/57548 train numbers on a daily basis.

== Average speed and frequency ==
The 57547/Hyderabad - Purna Passenger runs with an average speed of 33 km/h and completes 433 km in 13h 10m. The 57548/Purna - Hyderabad Passenger runs with an average speed of 34 km/h and completes 433 km in 12h 35m.

== Route and halts ==
The important halts of the train are:

- Hyderabad Deccan
- Begumpet
- Vikarabad Junction
- Bidar
- Latur Road Junction
- Parli Vaijnath
- Parbhani Junction
- Purna Junction

== Coach composite ==
The train has standard ICF rakes with max speed of 110 kmph. The train consists of 12 coaches:

- 10 General Unreserved
- 2 Seating cum Luggage Rake

Loco	1	2	3	4	5	6	7	8	9	10	11	12
	SLR	GEN	GEN	GEN	GEN	GEN	GEN	GEN	GEN	GEN	GEN	SLR

== Traction ==
Both trains are hauled by a Moula Ali Loco Shed based WDG-3A diesel locomotive from Hyderabad to Purna and vice versa.

== Rake sharing ==
The train shares its rake with 57549/57550 Hyderabad - Aurangabad Passenger.

== Direction reversal ==
Train Reverses its direction 1 times:

- Parli Vaijnath

== See also ==
- Hyderabad Deccan railway station
- Purna Junction railway station
- Hyderabad - Aurangabad Passenger
