= Lokmanya Tilak Terminus–Bidar Express =

Lokmanya Tilak Terminus - Bidar Express
Overview
- Service type: Express
- First service: 10 February 2015; 10 years ago
- Current operator: Central Railway zone

Route
- Termini: Lokmanya Tilak Terminus (LTT); Bidar (BIDR)
- Stops: 13
- Distance travelled: 655 km (407 mi)
- Average journey time: 13 hours 25 minutes
- Service frequency: Two days (Note: Runs two days in a week for every direction.)
- Train number: 11075/11076

On-board services
- Classes: AC 2 Tier, AC 3 Tier, Sleeper 3 Tier, Unreserved
- Seating arrangements: No
- Sleeping arrangements: Yes
- Catering facilities: No
- Entertainment facilities: No

Technical
- Rolling stock: 2
- Track gauge: 1,676 mm (5 ft 6 in)
- Operating speed: 58 km/h (36 mph)

Lokmanya Tilak Terminus - Bidar Express is an express train of the Indian Railways connecting Lokmanya Tilak Terminus in Maharashtra and Bidar of Karnataka. It is currently being operated with 11075/11076 train numbers on a weekly basis.

== Service ==
The 11075/Mumbai LTT - Bidar Express has an average speed of 49 km/h and covers 655 km in 13 hrs 25 mins. 11076/Bidar - Mumbai LTT Express has an average speed of 42 km/h and 655 km in 15 hrs 35 mins.

== Route and halts ==
The important halts of the train are:

- Lokmanya Tilak Terminus
- Thane
- Kalyan Junction
- Karjat
- Lonavala
- Pune Junction
- Kurduvadi Junction
- Barshi Town
- Dharashiv
- Latur
- Latur Road Junction
- Udgir
- Kamalnagar
- Bhalki
- Bidar

== Coach composite ==
The train consists of 18 coaches :

- 1 AC II Tier
- 2 AC III Tier
- 7 Sleeper Coaches
- 6 General
- 2 Second-class Luggage/parcel van

== Traction ==
Both trains are hauled by a Kalyan Loco Shed based WDM-3D diesel locomotive from Kurla to Bidar.
