= Kolhapur–Dhanbad Deekshabhoomi Express =

Train in India

CSMT Kolhapur-Dhanbad Deekshabhoomi Express
Overview
- Service type: Express
- Locale: Maharashtra, Telangana, Madhya Pradesh, Uttar Pradesh, Bihar & Jharkhand
- First service: 14 April 1997; 29 years ago
- Current operator: Central Railway

Route
- Termini: SCSMT Kolhapur (KOP); Dhanbad Junction (DHN)
- Stops: 38
- Distance travelled: 2,505 km (1,557 mi)
- Average journey time: 52 hrs 00 mins
- Service frequency: Weekly
- Train number: 11045 / 11046

On-board services
- Classes: AC 2 Tier, AC 3 Tier, Sleeper Class, General Unreserved
- Seating arrangements: Yes
- Sleeping arrangements: Yes
- Catering facilities: Available but no pantry car
- Observation facilities: Large windows
- Baggage facilities: No
- Other facilities: Below the seats

Technical
- Rolling stock: LHB coach
- Track gauge: 1,676 mm (5 ft 6 in)
- Operating speed: 48 km/h (30 mph) average including halts.
- Rake maintenance: SCSMT Kolhapur (KOP)

The 11045 / 11046 CSMT Kolhapur–Dhanbad Deekshabhoomi Express is the express trains which connect Chhatrapati Shahu Maharaj Terminus, Kolhapur, Maharashtra and Dhanbad Junction, Jharkhand. This train runs via Latur from 19 February 2021. During its travel it covers a distance of 2,505 km (1,557 mi), for that it takes 52 hrs 00 mins. It runs with an average speed of 48 km/h (30 mph) during its journey and covers 38 halts and 337 intermediate stations.

The trains stop at Miraj Junction, Kavathe Mahankal, Dhalgaon, Pandharpur, Kurduvadi, Barsi Town, Usmanabad, Latur, Latur road Junction, Parli Vaijnath, Parbhani Junction, Purna Junction, Hazur Sahib Nanded, Kinwat, Adilabad, Wani, Majri Junction, Sevagram, Nagpur, Amla Junction, Betul, Ghoradongri, Itarsi Junction, Jabalpur, Katni, Satna, Prayagraj Cheoki, Deen Dayaj Upadhyay Junction, Bhabua Road, Sasaram Junction, Dehri On Sone, Anugrah Narayan Road, Gaya Junction, Koderma and Parasnath.

== Coaches ==
The 11045/11046 Deekshabhoomi Express presently has -

- 1 Second AC
- 5 Third AC
- 11 Sleeper class
- 3 General Unreserved
- 2 SLR

== Route ==
- SCSMT Kolhapur
- Miraj Junction
- Kurduvadi Junction
- Latur
- Latur Road
- Parli Vaijnath
- Parbhani Junction
- Purna Junction
- Hazur Sahib Nanded
- Adilabad
- Nagpur Junction
- Itarsi Junction
- Jabalpur Junction
- Katni Junction
- Satna Junction
- [[ railway station, Prayagraj Junction|]]
- Varanasi Junction
- Pandit Deen Dayal Upadhyaya Junction
- Gaya Junction
- Koderma Junction
- Parasnath
- Dhanbad Junction

== Direction reversal ==
It reverses the direction 3 times,

1. Miraj Junction railway station
2. Latur Road railway station
3. Parli Vaijnath railway station

== Traction ==
It is hauled by an Electric Loco Shed, Kalyan-based WAP-7 locomotive from KOP to DHN and vice versa.

== See also ==
- CSMT Kolhapur–Hazrat Nizamuddin Superfast Express
