= Mumbai CSMT–Bidar Superfast Express =

Mumbai Chhatrapati Shivaji Maharaj Terminus–Bidar Superfast Express
Overview
- Service type: Superfast
- Current operator: Central Railway zone

Route
- Termini: Chhatrapati Shivaji Maharaj Terminus (CSMT); Bidar (BIDR)
- Stops: 16
- Distance travelled: 672 km (418 mi)
- Average journey time: 12h 15m
- Service frequency: Tri-weekly (Note: Runs three days in a week for every direction.)
- Train number: 22143/22144

On-board services
- Classes: AC 2 tier, AC 3 tier, Sleeper class, General Unreserved
- Seating arrangements: No
- Sleeping arrangements: Yes
- Catering facilities: On-board catering E-catering
- Observation facilities: ICF coach
- Entertainment facilities: No
- Baggage facilities: No
- Other facilities: Below the seats

Technical
- Rolling stock: 2
- Track gauge: 1,676 mm (5 ft 6 in)
- Operating speed: 55 km/h (34 mph), including halts

The Mumbai Chhatrapati Shivaji Maharaj Terminus–Bidar Superfast Express is a Superfast train belonging to Central Railway zone that runs between Chhatrapati Shivaji Maharaj Terminus and Bidar in India. It is currently being operated with 22143/22144 train numbers on tri-weekly basis.

== Service ==
- 22143/Mumbai Chhatrapati Shivaji Maharaj Terminus–Bidar Superfast Express has an average speed of 55 km/h and covers 672 km in 12h 15m.
- 22144/Bidar–Mumbai Chhatrapati Shivaji Maharaj Terminus Superfast Express has an average speed of 55 km/h and covers 672 km in 12h 15m.

== Route and halts ==
The important halts of the train are:

- Chhatrapati Shivaji Maharaj Terminus
- Dadar
- Thane
- Kalyan Junction
- Karjat
- Lonavala
- Pune Junction
- Daund Junction
- Kurduvadi Junction
- Barsi Town
- Dharashiv
- Harangul
- Latur
- Latur Road Junction
- Udgir
- Bhalki
- Bidar

== Coach composition ==
The train has standard ICF – CBC rakes with max speed of 110 kmph. The train consists of 19 coaches:

- 1 First AC and AC II Tier
- 1 AC II Tier
- 2 AC III Tier
- 8 Sleeper coaches
- 5 General Unreserved
- 2 Seating cum Luggage Rake

== Traction ==
Both trains are hauled by a Kalyan Loco Shed-based WDG-3A or WDP-4D diesel locomotive from Mumbai to Bidar and vice versa.

== Rake sharing ==
The train shares its rake with 22107/22108 Latur–Mumbai Express.

== See also ==
- Chhatrapati Shivaji Maharaj Terminus
- Bidar railway station
- Mumbai CSMT–Latur Superfast Express
