= Parbhani–Parli Vaijnath line =

Railway line in Maharashtra, India

Overview
- Status: Operational
- Owner: Indian Railways
- Locale: Maharashtra
- Termini: Parbhani Junction; Parli Vaijnath
- Stations: 9 approx

Service
- Type: Branch line
- System: Electric loco system
- Operator: South Central Railway

Technical
- Track length: 64 km (40 mi)
- Number of tracks: 1 (single)
- Track gauge: 5 ft 6 in (1,676 mm) broad gauge
- Electrification: Yes

Parbhani-Parli Vaijnath is a railway line connecting Parbhani Junction and Parli Vaijnath in Maharashtra. It is administered by South Central Railway.

The line starts at Parbhani Junction and ends at Parli Vaijnath and has around 6 railway stations between them. Gangakhed railway station lies on this railway line.

== Trains ==
Some of the Express and Passenger trains that passing through this line are

- KSR Bengaluru-Hazur Sahib Nanded Express
- Guntur-Aurangabad Express
- CSMT Kolhapur-Dhanbad Weekly Express
- Sainagar Shirdi-Machilipatnam Express
- Panvel-Hazur Sahib Nanded Express
- Sainagar Shirdi–Secunderabad Express
- Aurangabad-Tirupati Weekly Express
- Nagpur-CSMT Kolhapur Express
- Sainagar Shirdi-Kakinada Port Express
- Akola-Parli Vaijnath Express
- Purna-Hyderabad Express
- Pune-Amravati Express (via Latur)
- Purna-Parli Vaijnath Passenger
- Nizamabad-Pandharpur Express
- Adilabad-Parli Vaijnath Special

== See also ==
- Purna-Akola line
- Wardha-Nanded line
