= Pune–Bhusaval Express =

Train in India

Pune–Amravati Express (via Latur)
Overview
- Service type: Express
- Locale: Maharashtra
- First service: 3 March 2013; 12 years ago
- Current operator: Central Railway

Route
- Termini: Pune (PUNE); Amravati (AMI)
- Stops: 19
- Distance travelled: 820 km (510 mi)
- Average journey time: 18 hours 45 minutes
- Service frequency: Bi-weekly
- Train number: 11405 / 11406

On-board services
- Classes: AC 2 tier, Ac 3 tier, Sleeper class, General Unreserved
- Seating arrangements: Yes
- Sleeping arrangements: Yes
- Catering facilities: E-catering
- Observation facilities: Overhead racks
- Entertainment facilities: No
- Baggage facilities: Available
- Other facilities: Below the seats

Technical
- Rolling stock: ICF coach
- Track gauge: 1,676 mm (5 ft 6 in)
- Operating speed: 110 km/h (68 mph) maximum, 44 km/h (27 mph) average including halts

The 11405 / 11406 Pune–Amravati Express (via Latur) is an Express train operated by the Central Railway zone of Indian Railways. It runs between Pune Junction and Amravati in India.

It operates as train number 11405 from Amravati to Pune Junction, and as train number 11406 in the reverse direction.

The train initially ran from Pune Junction to Nasik Road. When the new time table of 2012/13 came into effect, its route was extended to Bhusaval Junction from 1 July 2012. It was further extended to Amravati in November 2023.

== Coaches ==
The 11405/11406 Pune–Amravati Express (via Latur) presently has 1 AC Chair Car, 14 Second Class, 1 sleeper & 1 General Unreserved coach & 2 SLR coaches.

As with most train services in India, coach composition may be amended at the discretion of Indian Railways depending on demand.

== Service ==
The 11405 Amravati–Pune Express covers the distance of 820 kilometres in 18 hours 45 mins (44 km/h) & in 18 hours 45 mins (44 km/h) as 11406 Pune–Amravati Express.

As the average speed of the train is below 55 km/h, as per Indian Railways rules, its fare excludes a Superfast surcharge.

== Routeing ==
The 11405/06 Pune–Amravati Express runs from Pune Junction via Uruli, Daund Junction, Dharashiv, Latur, Latur Road Junction, Parli Vaijnath, Parbhani, Purna Junction, Hingoli Deccan, Akola Junction, Badnera Junction to Amravati.

== Traction ==
It is hauled by a Pune-based WDP-4D diesel locomotive on its entire journey.

== Direction reversals ==
The train reverses its direction three times at;

- Akola Junction
- Parli Vaijnath and
- Latur Road Junction.

== Time table ==
- 11405 Amravati–Pune Express leaves Amravati on a Bi-weekly basis at 19:50 hrs IST and reaches Pune Junction at 16:25 hrs IST the next day.
- 11406 Pune–Amravati Express leaves Pune Junction on a Bi-weekly basis at 22:45 hrs IST and reaches Amravati at 17:30 hrs IST the next day.

== See also ==
- Hutatma Express
- Khandesh Express
