= Hyderabad–Aurangabad Passenger =

Train in India

Hyderabad - Aurangabad Passenger
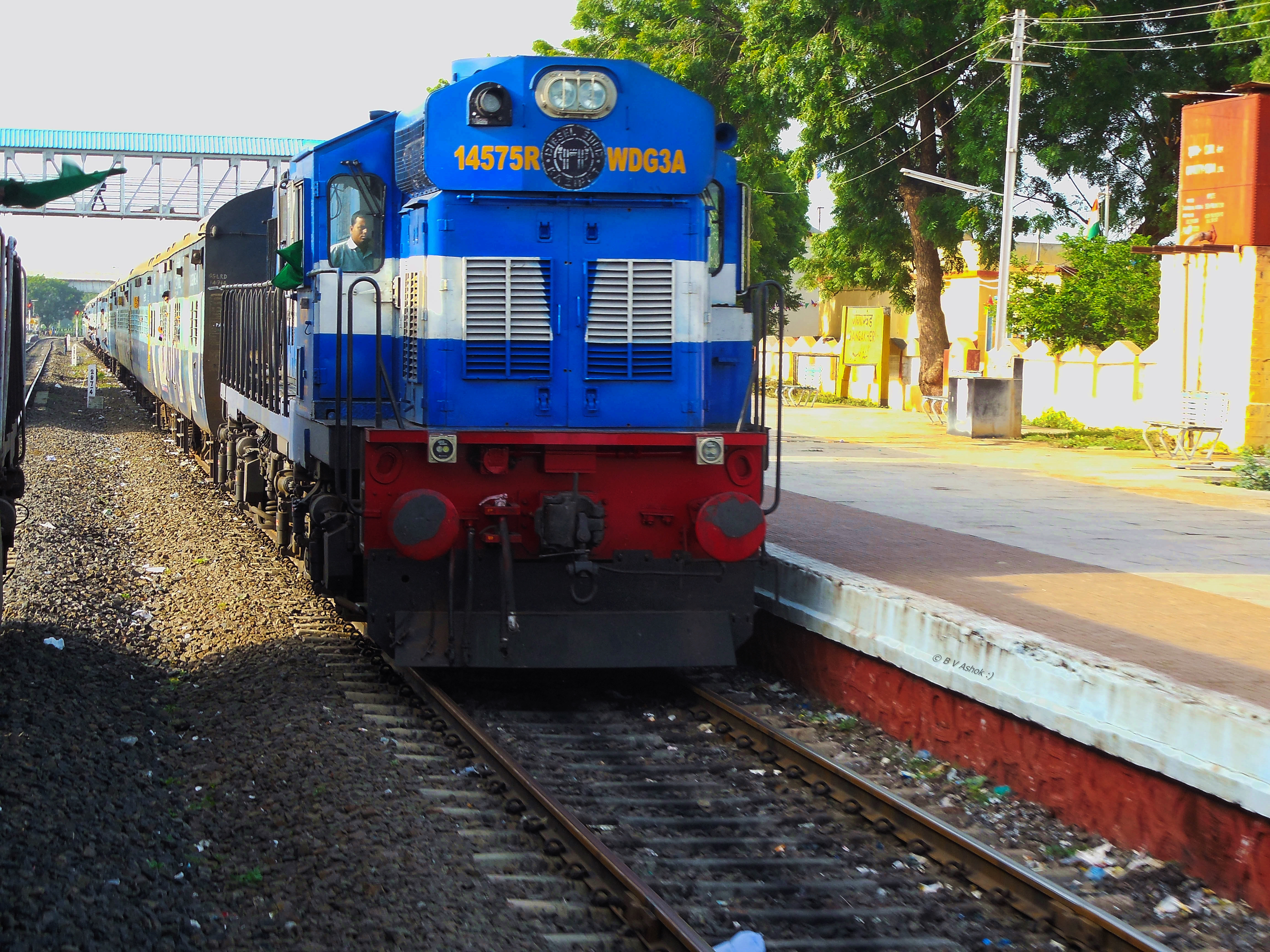

Overview
- Service type: Passenger
- Current operator: South Central Railway

Route
- Termini: Hyderabad Deccan (HYB); Aurangabad (AWB)
- Stops: 57
- Distance travelled: 582 km (362 mi)
- Average journey time: 16h 40m
- Service frequency: Daily (Note: Runs seven days in a week for every direction.)
- Train number: 57549/57550

On-board services
- Class: Unreserved
- Seating arrangements: Yes
- Sleeping arrangements: No
- Catering facilities: No
- Entertainment facilities: No
- Baggage facilities: No

Technical
- Rolling stock: 2
- Track gauge: 5 ft 6 in (1,676 mm)
- Operating speed: 35 km/h (22 mph) average with halts
Route map
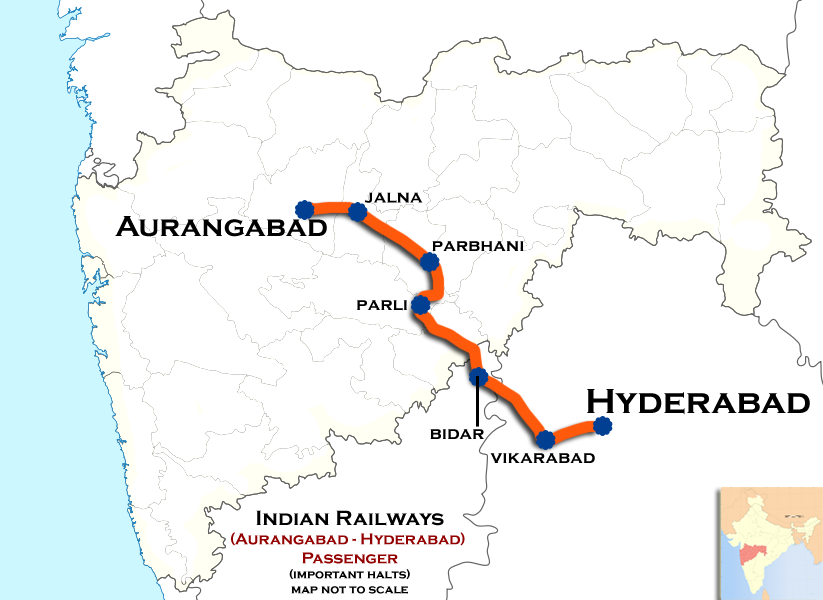

Hyderabad - Aurangabad Passenger is a passenger train belonging to South Central Railway zone that runs between Hyderabad Deccan and Aurangabad. It is currently being operated with 57549/57550 train numbers on a daily basis.

== Average speed and frequency ==
The 57549/Hyderabad - Aurangabad Passenger runs with an average speed of 35 km/h and completes 582 km in 16h 40m. The 57550/Aurangabad - Hyderabad Passenger runs with an average speed of 38 km/h and completes 582 km in 15h 30m.

== Route and halts ==
The important halts of the train are:

- Hyderabad Deccan
- Begumpet
- Vikarabad Junction
- Bidar
- Latur Road Junction
- Parli Vaijnath
- Parbhani Junction
- Selu
- Partur
- Jalna
- Badnapur
- Chikalthan
- Aurangabad

== Coach composite ==
The train has standard ICF rakes with max speed of 110 kmph. The train consists of 12 coaches:

- 3 Sleeper Coaches
- 7 General Unreserved
- 2 Seating cum Luggage Rake

Loco	1	2	3	4	5	6	7	8	9	10	11	12
	SLR	S3	S2	S1	GEN	GEN	GEN	GEN	GEN	GEN	GEN	SLR

== Traction ==
Both trains are hauled by a Moula Ali Loco Shed based WDG-3A diesel locomotive from Hyderabad to Aurangabad and vice versa.

== Rake sharing ==
The train shares its rake with 57547/57548 Hyderabad - Purna Passenger.

== Direction reversal ==
Train Reverses its direction 2 times:

- Parli Vaijnath
- Parbhani Junction

== See also ==
- Hyderabad Deccan railway station
- Aurangabad railway station
- Hyderabad - Purna Passenger
