= Bidar–Kolhapur SCSMT Express =

Express train in India

Bidar – Kolhapur Shri Chhatrapati Shahu Maharaj Terminus Express
Overview
- Service type: Express
- First service: 14 June 2018
- Current operator: Central Railways

Route
- Termini: Bidar; Shri Chhatrapati Shahu Maharaj Terminus
- Stops: 8
- Distance travelled: 535 km (332 mi)
- Average journey time: 11 Hours 50 mins
- Service frequency: Weekly
- Train number: 11415 / 11416

On-board services
- Classes: AC 1st Class, AC 2 tier, AC 3 tier, Sleeper, General
- Sleeping arrangements: Yes
- Catering facilities: No Pantry Car Coach attached

Technical
- Rolling stock: ICF coach
- Track gauge: 1,676 mm (5 ft 6 in)
- Operating speed: 140 km/h (87 mph) maximum,46 km/h (29 mph), including halts

Bidar – Kolhapur Shri Chhatrapati Shahu Maharaj Terminus Express was a weekly express train which ran between Bidar & Kolhapur under the South Central Railway zone & Central Railway zone in Karnataka & Maharashtra states in India. It was permanently cancelled in ZBTT.

== Overview ==
This train was inaugurated on 8 June 2018to directly connect southern Maharashtra and northern Karnataka. It was inaugurated as weekly special train after 20 June 2018, and due to the demand for it was converted to regular weekly train service.

== Routes ==
This train passed through Miraj Junction, Pandharpur, Dharashiv & Latur on both sides.

== Traction ==
The route was not electrified so a WDM 3A pulled the train.
