= Nagpur–CSMT Kolhapur Express =

Train in India

Nagpur Junction - Shri Chhatrapati Shahu Maharaj Terminus Kolhapur Express
Overview
- Service type: Express
- First service: 1 January 2011; 14 years ago
- Current operator: Central Railway zone

Route
- Termini: Nagpur Junction (NGP); Shri Chhatrapati Shahu Maharaj Terminus (KOP)
- Stops: 12
- Distance travelled: 1,038 km (645 mi)
- Average journey time: 23 hours
- Service frequency: Two days (Note: Runs two days in a week for every direction.)
- Train number: 11403/11404

On-board services
- Classes: AC 2 tier, AC 3 tier, Sleeper Class, General Unreserved
- Seating arrangements: No
- Sleeping arrangements: Yes
- Catering facilities: No
- Entertainment facilities: No
- Baggage facilities: Below the seats

Technical
- Rolling stock: 2
- Track gauge: 1,676 mm (5 ft 6 in)
- Operating speed: 45 km/h (28 mph)

Nagpur Junction - Shri Chhatrapati Shahu Maharaj Terminus Kolhapur Express is an express train of the Indian Railways connecting Nagpur Junction in Maharashtra and Shri Chhatrapati Shahu Maharaj Terminus of Maharashtra. It is currently being operated with 11403/11404 train numbers on a biweekly basis.

== Service ==
The 11403/Nagpur Junction - Kolhapur Shri Chhatrapati Shahu Maharaj Terminus Express has an average speed of 45 km/h and covers 1038 km in 23 hrs. 11404/Shri Chhatrapati Shahu Maharaj Terminus Kolhapur - Nagpur Junction Express has an average speed of 44 km/h and 1038 km in 23 hrs 45 mins.

== Route and halts ==
The important halts of the train are:

- Nagpur Junction
- Wardha Junction
- Badnera Junction
- Murtajapur Junction
- Akola Junction
- Washim
- Hingoli Deccan
- Basmat
- Purna Junction
- Parbhani Junction
- Gangakher
- Parli Vaijnath
- Latur
- Latur Road Junction
- Dharashiv
- Kurduvadi Junction
- Pandharpur
- Sangola
- Miraj Junction
- Shri Chhatrapati Shahu Maharaj Terminus

== Coach composite ==
The train has standard ICF rakes with a maximum speed of 110 km/h. The train consists of 22 coaches :

- 1 AC II Tier
- 2 AC III Tier
- 9 Sleeper Coaches
- 6 General
- 2 Second-class Luggage/parcel van

== Traction ==
Both trains are hauled by a Pune Loco Shed based WDM 3A diesel locomotive from Nagpur to Kolhapur and vice versa.

== Schedule ==
11403 - Leaves Nagpur Jn. every Tuesday, Saturday at 3:00 PM IST and reach SCSMT Kolhapur on next day(Wednesday, Sunday) at 2:00 PM IST

11404 - leaves SCSMT Kolhapur every Monday, Friday and reach Nagpur Jn. next Day (Tuesday, Saturday) at 12:35 PM IST

== Direction reversal ==
Train Reverses its direction 4 times:

- Akola Junction
- Parli Vaijnath
- Latur Road Junction
- Miraj Junction

== See also ==
- Maharashtra Express
