= Panvel–Hazur Sahib Nanded Express =

Express train in India

Overview
- Service type: Express
- First service: 3 July 2011; 15 years ago
- Current operator: South Central Railways

Route
- Termini: Panvel (PNVL); Hazur Sahib Nanded (NED)
- Stops: 14
- Distance travelled: 674 km (419 mi)
- Average journey time: 17h 25m
- Service frequency: Six days a week (Note: Runs six days in a week for every direction.)
- Train number: 17613 / 17614

On-board services
- Classes: AC 1 Class AC 2 Class AC 3 tier, Sleeper class, General Unreserved
- Seating arrangements: Yes
- Sleeping arrangements: Yes
- Catering facilities: On-board catering E-catering
- Observation facilities: Large windows
- Baggage facilities: Available
- Other facilities: Below the seats

Technical
- Rolling stock: LHB coach
- Track gauge: 1,676 mm (5 ft 6 in)
- Operating speed: 43 km/h (27 mph) average including halts

The 17613 / 17614 Panvel–Hazur Sahib Nanded Express is an Express train belonging to the South Central Railway zone of Indian Railways that runs between Panvel and Hazur Sahib Nanded via Latur, Osmanabad in India. It is currently being operated with 17613/17614 train numbers on a daily basis.

== Service ==
The 17613/Panvel–Hazur Sahib Nanded Express has an average speed of 39 km/h and covers 674 km in 16h 45m. The 17614/Hazur Sahib Nanded–Panvel Express has an average speed of 44 km/h and covers 674 km in 14h 15m.

== Route and Halts ==
The important halts of the train are

- Panvel
- Karjat
- Lonavala
- Talegaon
- Chinchwad
- Pune Junction
- Daund Junction
- Kurduvadi Junction
- Barsi Town
- Dharashiv
- Latur
- Latur Road Junction
- Parli Vaijnath
- Gangakher
- Parbhani Junction
- Purna Junction
- Hazur Sahib Nanded

== Coach composition ==
The train had standard ICF rakes, which were now replaced with LHB rakes. It runs with a maximum speed of 110 kmph. The train consists of 17 coaches:

- 1 AC II Tier
- 5 AC III Tier
- 5 Sleeper coaches
- 4 General Unreserved
- 1 Seating cum Luggage Rake
- 1 Power Car

== Traction ==
Both trains are hauled by a KLY Loco Shed-based WAP-7 electric locomotive from Panvel Junction to Hazur Sahib Nanded and vice versa.

== Direction reversal ==
The train reverses its direction 2 times:

- Parli Vaijnath
- Latur Road Junction

== Schedule ==
Runs daily between Nanded–Panvel–Nanded.

== See also ==
- Panvel railway station
- Hazur Sahib Nanded railway station
- Lokmanya Tilak Terminus Nizamabad Express
