= Yesvantpur–Latur Express =

Train in India

Overview
- Service type: Express
- First service: 3 February 2018; 8 years ago
- Current operator: South Western Railway

Route
- Termini: Yesvantpur (YPR); Latur (LUR)
- Stops: 18
- Distance travelled: 854 km (531 mi)
- Average journey time: 17 hours 25 minutes
- Service frequency: Tri-Weekly
- Train number: 16583 / 16584

On-board services
- Classes: AC First Class, AC 2 Tier, AC 3 Tier, Sleeper Class, General Unreserved
- Seating arrangements: Yes
- Sleeping arrangements: Yes
- Catering facilities: On-board catering, E-catering
- Observation facilities: Large windows
- Baggage facilities: No
- Other facilities: Below the seats

Technical
- Rolling stock: LHB coach
- Track gauge: 1,676 mm (5 ft 6 in)
- Operating speed: 130 km/h (81 mph) maximum, 49 km/h (30 mph) average including halts.

The 16583 / 16584 Yesvantpur–Latur Express is an express train belonging to South Western Railway zone of Indian Railways that runs between Yesvantpur Junction and Latur in India.

== Background ==
This train was inaugurated on 3 February 2018, an extension of Yesvantpur–Bidar Express for connectivity between the southern parts of Marathwada (a region in Maharashtra) to Bangalore.

== Service ==
The frequency of this train is three days a week, it covers the distance of 854 km with an average speed of 49 km/h.

== Routes ==
This train passes through Yelahanka Junction, Guntakal Junction, Raichur, Vikarabad Junction and Bidar on both sides.

== Traction ==
As the route is fully electrified, a Krishnarajapuram Loco Shed based WAP-7 electric locomotive from Latur to Yesvantpur and vice versa.
