= Sainagar Shirdi–Secunderabad Express =

Express passenger train in India

Secunderabad-Sainagar Shirdi Express
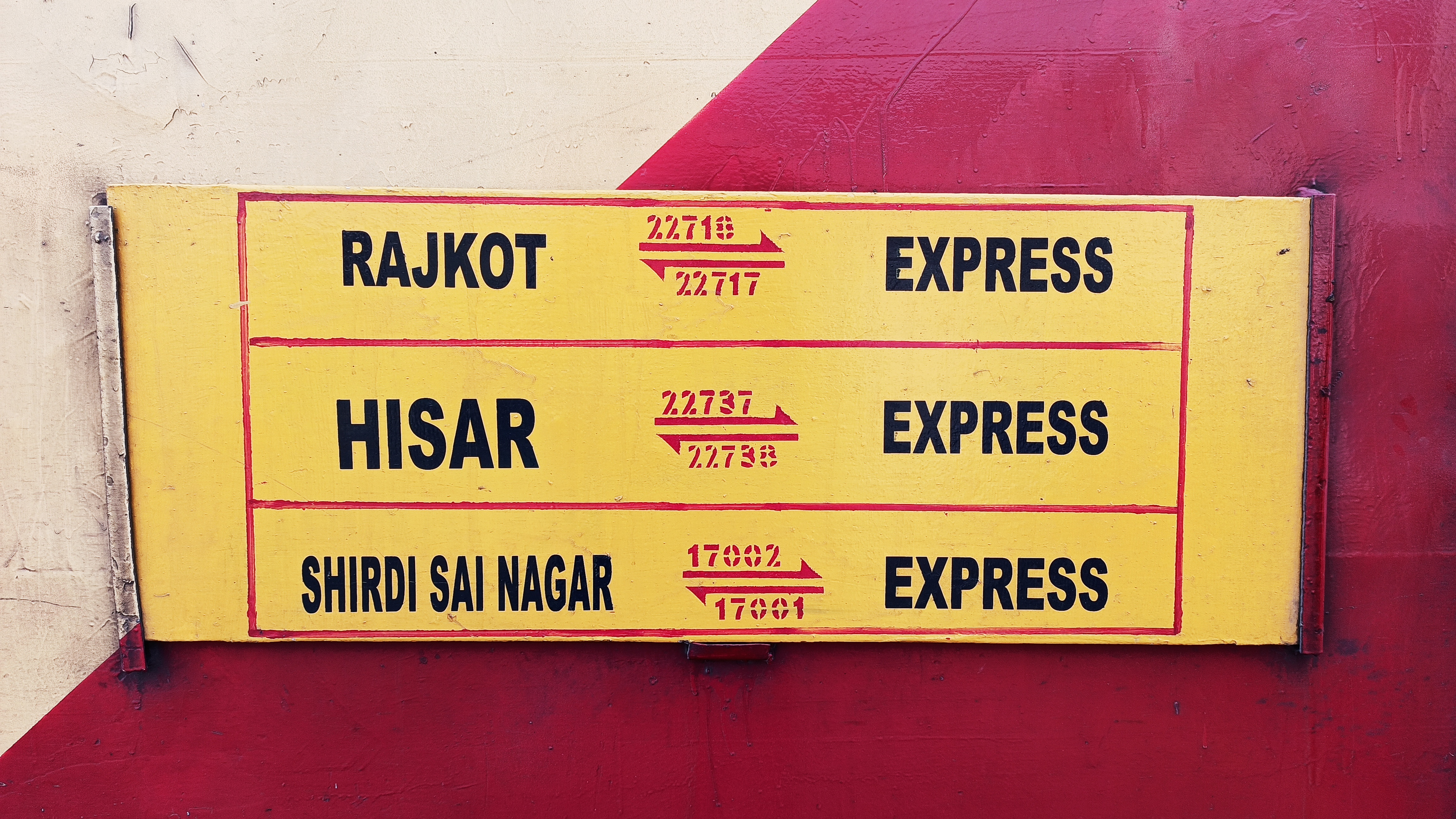

Overview
- Service type: Express
- Locale: Telangana, Karnataka and Maharashtra
- First service: 3 September 2007; 18 years ago
- Current operator: South Central Railway

Route
- Termini: Secunderabad (SC); Sainagar Shirdi (SNSI)
- Stops: 23
- Distance travelled: 1,306 km (812 mi)
- Average journey time: 16 hrs 10 mins
- Service frequency: Daily
- Train number: 17001 / 17002

On-board services
- Classes: AC 2 Tier, AC 3 Tier, Sleeper Class, General Unreserved
- Seating arrangements: Yes
- Sleeping arrangements: Yes
- Catering facilities: On-board catering, E-catering
- Observation facilities: Large windows
- Baggage facilities: No
- Other facilities: Below the seats

Technical
- Rolling stock: ICF coach
- Track gauge: 1,676 mm (5 ft 6 in)
- Operating speed: 48 km/h (30 mph) average including halts
Route map
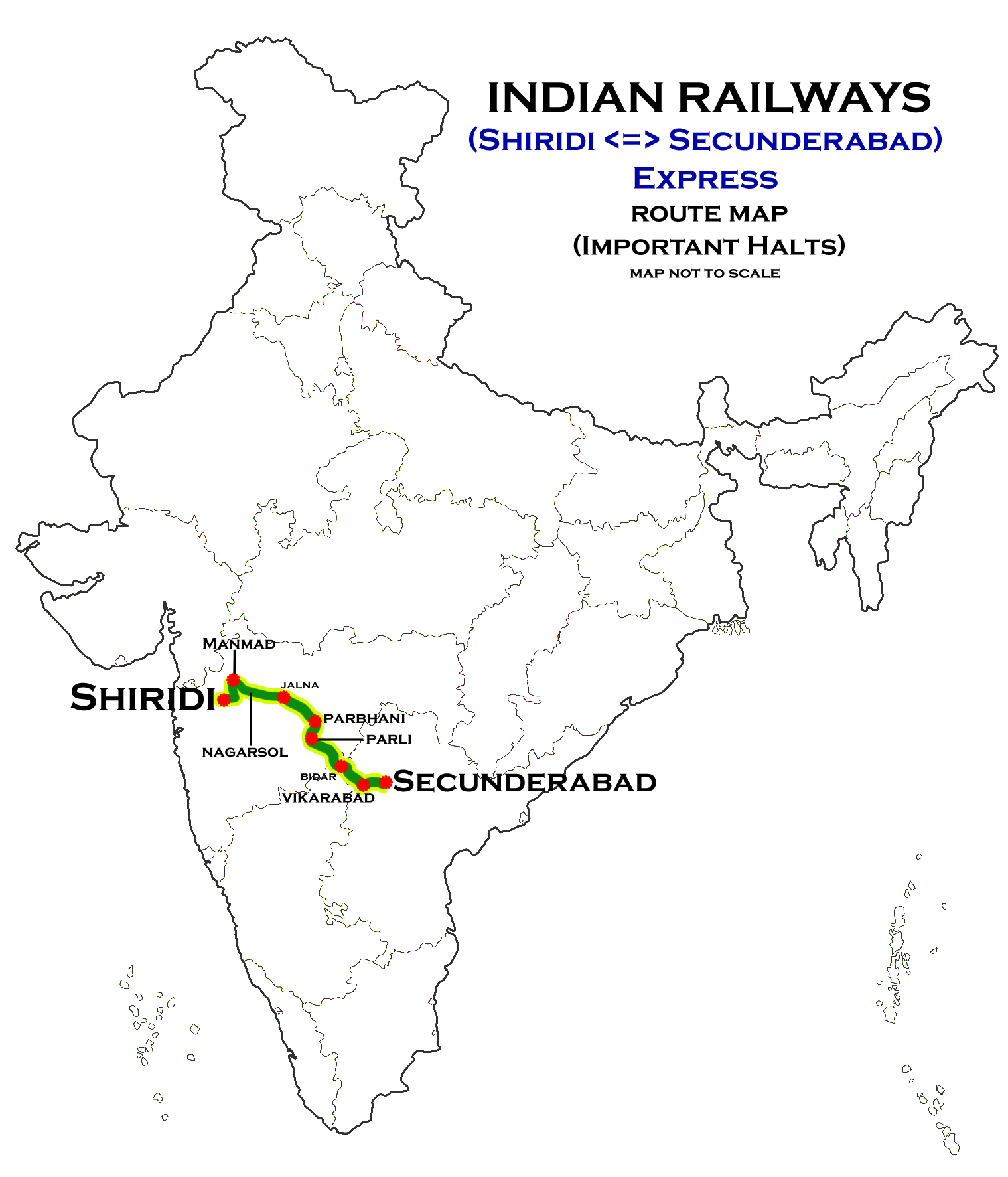

The 17001 / 17002 Secunderabad–Sainagar Shirdi Express is an express train belonging to Indian Railways South Central Railway zone that runs between Secunderabad Junction and Sainagar Shirdi in India.

== Service ==
It operates as train number 17002 from Secunderabad Junction to Sainagar Shirdi and as train number 17001 in the reverse direction, serving the states of Telangana, Karnataka and Maharashtra. The train covers the distance of 777 km (483 mi) in 16 hours 12 mins approximately at a speed of 48 km/h (30 mph).

== Coaches ==
The 17002 / 01 Secunderabad–Sainagar Shirdi Express has two AC 2-tier, four AC 3-tier, 10 sleeper class, three general unreserved and two SLR (seating with luggage rake) coaches. It carries a pantry car.

As with most train services in India, coach composition may be amended at the discretion of Indian Railways depending on demand.

== Routing ==
The 17002 / 01 Secunderabad–Sainagar Shirdi Express runs from Secunderabad Junction via Vikarabad Junction, Zahirabad, Bidar, Bhalki, Latur Road junction, Parli Vaijnath, Gangakher Parbhani Junction, Jalna, Chhatrapati Sambhajinagar, Lasur, Rotegoan Nagarsol, Manmad Junction, Puntamba to Sainagar Shirdi.

== Traction ==
As the entire route is fully electrified, a Vijayawada Loco Shed based WAP-4 electric locomotive pulls the train to its destination.
