= Latur–Mumbai CSMT Superfast Express =

Train in Maharashtra, India

Mumbai Chhatrapati Shivaji Maharaj Terminus–Latur Superfast Express
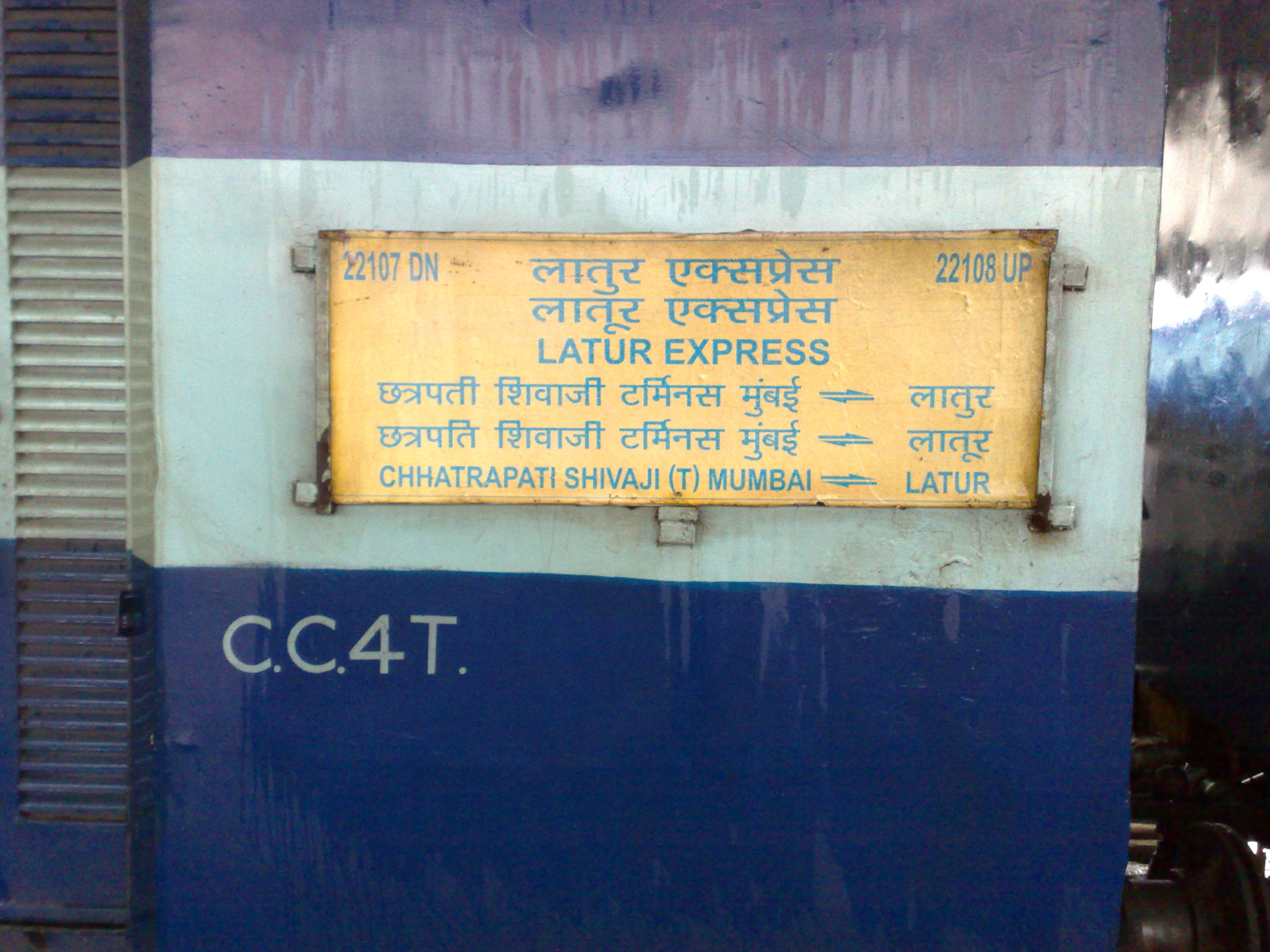

Overview
- Service type: Superfast Express
- Locale: Maharashtra
- Current operator: Central Railways

Route
- Termini: Chhatrapati Shivaji Maharaj Terminus; Latur
- Stops: 9
- Distance travelled: 530 km (329 mi)
- Average journey time: 9 hours 25 minutes as 22107 Latur Express, 9 hours 30 minutes as 22108 Latur Express
- Service frequency: Mon/Tue/Wed/Fri(22108) Sun/Mon/Tue/Thu(22107)
- Train number: 22107 / 22108

On-board services
- Classes: 1 AC 1st Class, 3 AC 2 tier, 5 AC 3 tier, 9 Sleeper class,4 General UNRESERVED,2 SLR.
- Seating arrangements: Yes
- Sleeping arrangements: Yes
- Auto-rack arrangements: No
- Catering facilities: Yes
- Observation facilities: Large windows
- Baggage facilities: below the seats

Technical
- Rolling stock: Standard Indian Railways coaches
- Track gauge: 1,676 mm (5 ft 6 in)
- Operating speed: 110 km/h (68 mph) maximum 55.8053 km/h (35 mph), including halts

An AC III Tier coach of Latur Express at Mumbai CST

Latur–Mumbai Chhatrapati Shivaji Maharaj Terminus Superfast Express is a Superfast Express trains in India train belonging to Indian Railways that runs between Chhatrapati Shivaji Maharaj Terminus, Mumbai and Latur in India. It is a daily service. It operates as train number 22107 from Chhatrapati Shivaji Maharaj Terminus, Mumbai to Latur and as train number 22108 in the reverse direction.

== Coaches ==
22107/22108 Latur Express presently has 1 AC 1st Class, 2 AC 2 tier, 4 AC 3 tier, 8 Sleeper class, 4 General Unreserved coaches & 2 SLR

As with most train services in India, coach composition may be amended at the discretion of Indian Railways depending on demand.

== Service ==
The 22107/Mumbai Chhatrapati Shivaji Maharaj Terminus–Latur Superfast Express covers the distance of 530 kilometres in 9 hours 30 mins (55.79 km/h) and 9 hours 25 mins as 22108/Latur–Mumbai Chhatrapati Shivaji Maharaj Terminus Superfast Express (55.8053 km/h).

As the average speed of the train is above 55 km/h (34 mph), as per Indian Railways rules, its fare includes a Superfast surcharge.

== Traction ==
It is a total diesel haul end to end. Usually a WDG-3A or WDP-4D locomotive from the Kalyan Junction Shed hauls the train. As the route is fully electrified now it hauls WAP7 or WAP4 loco.

== Schedule ==
This daily service departs Chhatrapati Shivaji Maharaj Terminus, Mumbai as Latur Express at 21:00 hrs IST and arrives Latur at 06:30 hrs IST the next day. In return journey, the train departs Latur as Mumbai Express at 22:30 hrs IST and arrives Chhatrapati Shivaji Maharaj Terminus, Mumbai at 08:05 hrs IST the next day.

=== Route ===
Station code	Station name	Distance (km)
CSMT	Chhatrapati Shivaji Maharaj Terminus	0
DR	Dadar	9
TNA	Thane	38.5
KYN	Kalyan Junction	54
KJT	Karjat	100
LNL	Lonavala	128
PUNE	Pune	192
DD	Daund Junction	268
KWY	Kurduvadi	377
BTW	Barshi	414
DRSV	Dharashiv	451
LUR	Latur	530
