= Sainagar Shirdi–Machilipatnam Express =

Passenger train in India

Sainagar Shirdi Machilipatnam Express
Overview
- Service type: Express
- Locale: Maharashtra, Karnataka, Telangana & Andhra Pradesh
- First service: 5 September 2007; 18 years ago
- Current operator: South Coast Railway zone

Route
- Termini: Sainagar Shirdi; Machilipatnam
- Stops: 32
- Distance travelled: 1,125 km (699 mi)
- Average journey time: 22 hours 22 mins
- Service frequency: Weekly(From MTM:Tuesday, From SNSI:Wednesday)
- Train number: 17207 / 17208

On-board services
- Classes: First AC, AC 2 Tier, AC 3 Tier, Sleeper Class & General Unreserved
- Seating arrangements: Yes
- Sleeping arrangements: Yes
- Catering facilities: Online Catering

Technical
- Rolling stock: Standard Indian Railways coaches ICF - CBC Coaches
- Track gauge: 1,676 mm (5 ft 6 in)
- Operating speed: 50.5 km/h (31 mph)
Route map
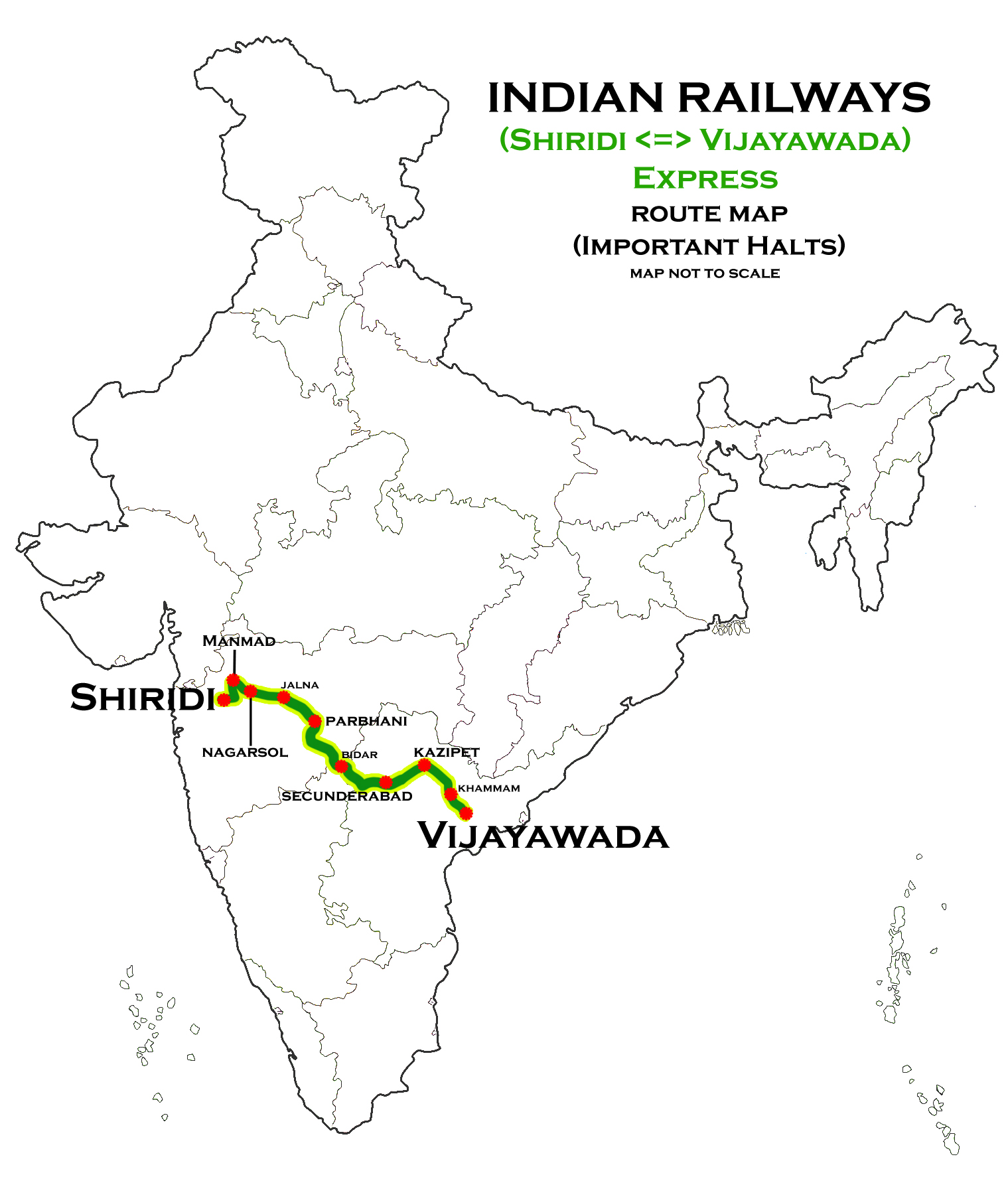

17207 / 08 Sainagar Shirdi–Machilipatnam Express is an express train belonging to South Coast Railway zone that run between Sainagar Shirdi and Machilipatnam in India.

== Service ==
It operates as train number 17207 from Sainagar Shirdi to Machilipatnam and as train number 17208 in the reverse direction, serving the states of Maharashtra, Karnataka, Telangana & Andhra Pradesh . The train covers the distance of 1,125 km (699 mi) in 22 hours 22 mins approximately at a speed of 50.5 km/h (31.4 mph).

== Coaches ==
The 17207 / 08 Sainagar Shirdi–Machilipatnam Express has One First Class, Two AC 2-tier, Two AC 3-tier, Ten sleeper class, four general unreserved & two SLR (seating with luggage rake) coaches .

As with most train services in India, coach composition may be amended at the discretion of Indian Railways depending on demand.

== Routing ==
The 17207 / 08 Sainagar Shirdi Machilipatnam Express runs from Sainagar Shirdi via Manmad Junction, Chhatrapati Sambhajinagar, Jalna, Parbhani Junction, Parli Vaijnath ,Latur Road junction, Vikarabad Junction, Secunderabad Junction, Kazipet Junction, Warangal, Khammam, Vijayawada Junction, Gudivada Junction, Machilipatnam.

== Traction ==
As this route is fully electrified, a Vijayawada-based WAP-4 electric locomotive loco pulls the train to Sainagar Shiri to Machilipatnam and vice-versa.
