= Yesvantpur–Bidar Express =

Train in India

Yesvantpur-Bidar Express
Overview
- Service type: Express
- First service: 3 September 2013; 13 years ago
- Current operator: South Western Railway

Route
- Termini: Yesvantpur (YPR); Bidar (BIDR)
- Stops: 13
- Distance travelled: 708 km (440 mi)
- Average journey time: 13 hours 30 minutes
- Service frequency: Daily
- Train number: 16571 / 16572

On-board services
- Classes: AC First Class, AC 2 Tier, AC 3 Tier, Sleeper Class, General Unreserved
- Seating arrangements: Yes
- Sleeping arrangements: Yes
- Catering facilities: On-board catering, E-catering
- Observation facilities: Large windows
- Baggage facilities: No
- Other facilities: Below the seats

Technical
- Rolling stock: LHB coach
- Track gauge: 1,676 mm (5 ft 6 in)
- Operating speed: 52 km/h (32 mph) average including halts.

The 16571 / 16572 Yesvantpur-Bidar Express is an express train belonging to Indian Railways South Western Railway zone that run between Yesvantpur Junction and Bidar. The Railway Board has decided to extend the services of Yesvantpur–Bidar Express train services up to Latur in Maharashtra for three days a week from February 2018, the South Western Railway has said in a release. in India.

== Extension to Latur ==
The Yesvantpur–Latur Tri Weekly Express (16583) will depart from Yesvantpur at 7 p.m. on Wednesday, Friday and Saturday and reach Latur at 1.05 p.m. the next day. En route, the train will have halts at Bidar (9.15/ 9.20 a.m.) and at Latur Road (12.08/12.10 p.m.). In the return direction, the Latur–Yesvantpur Tri Weekly Express (16584) will depart from Latur at 3 p.m. on Thursday, Saturday and Sunday and reach Yesvantpur at 7.40 a.m. En route, the train will have halts at Latur Road (3.35/ 3.37 p.m.) and at Bidar at (6.00/6.05 p.m.).

Meanwhile, the services of Yesvantpur–Bidar (16571) will continue as scheduled on Sunday, Monday, Tuesday and Thursday and that of Bidar–Yesvantpur Express (16572) on Monday, Tuesday, Wednesday and Friday, the release said.

== Service ==
It operates as train number 16571 from Yesvantpur Junction to Bidar and as train number 16572 in the reverse direction, serving the states of Andhra Pradesh, Telangana & Karnataka. The train covers the distance of 708 km (440 mi) in 14 hours 02 mins approximately at a speed of (50 km/h (31 mph)).

== Coaches ==
The 16571 / 72 Yesvantpur Junction–Bidar Express has one AC-1 Tier, one AC 2-Tier, one AC 3-tier, nine sleeper class, four general unreserved & two SLR (seating with luggage rake) coaches . It doesn't carry a pantry car.

As with most train services in India, coach composition may be amended at the discretion of Indian Railways depending on demand.

== Routeing ==
The 16571 / 72 Yesvantpur Junction–Bidar Express runs from Yesvantpur Junction via Dharmavaram Junction, Guntakal Junction, Raichur, Vikarabad Junction to Bidar.

== Traction ==
As this route is fully electrified, a Krishnarajapuram Loco Shed based WAP-7 electric locomotive from BIDAR to YESVANTPUR and vice versa.
