= Nizamabad–Pune Passenger =

Train in India

Nizamabad Pune Passenger
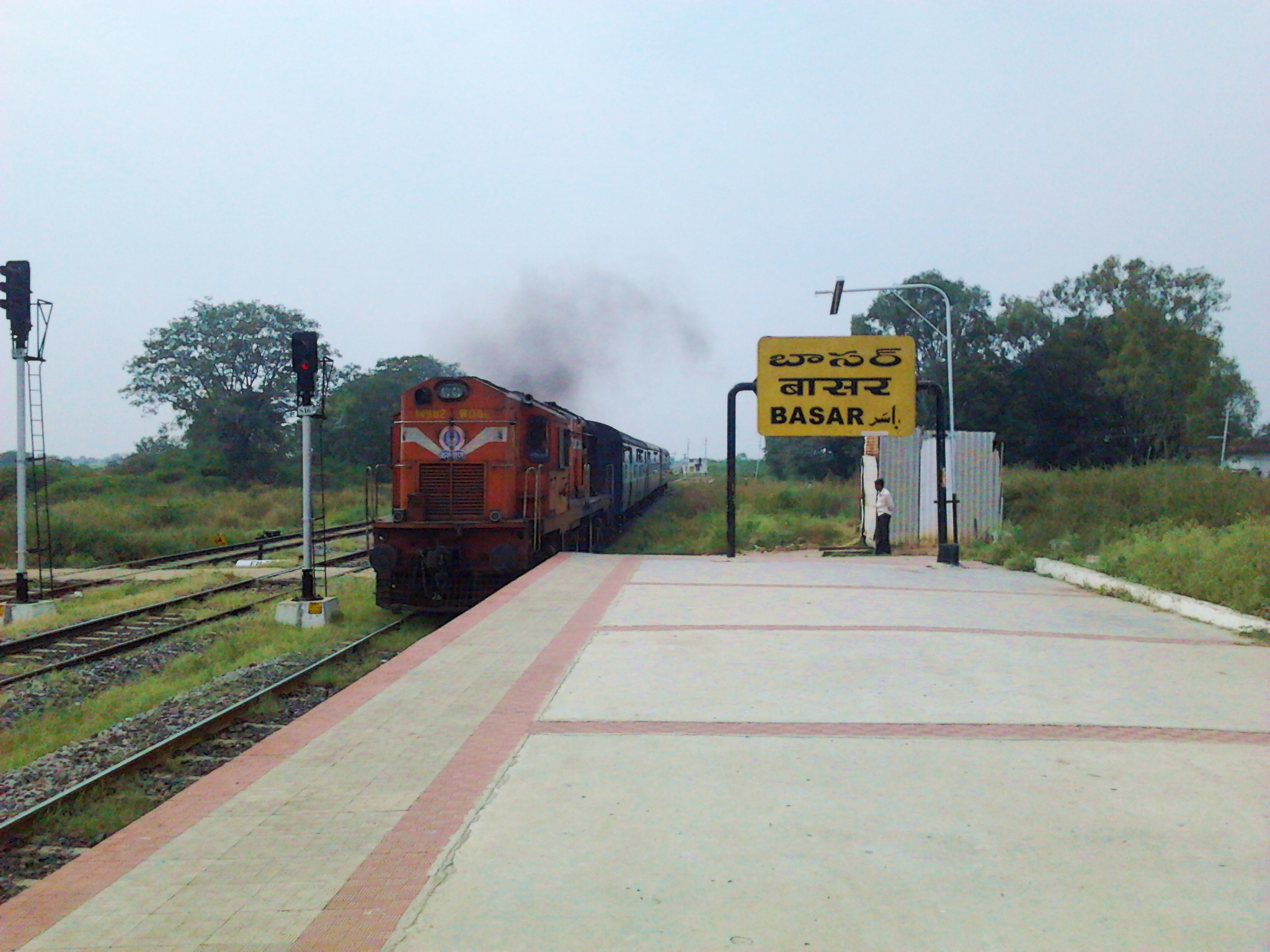
- Nizamabad Pune passenger at Basar railway station

Overview
- Service type: Passenger Train
- Current operator: Central Railways

Route
- Termini: Nizamabad Junction; Pune Junction
- Stops: 75 as 51422; 82 as 51421
- Distance travelled: 774 km (481 mi)
- Average journey time: 21 hours 15 minutes
- Service frequency: Daily
- Train number: 51422/21

On-board services
- Class: General Unreserved
- Seating arrangements: Indian Rail standard
- Observation facilities: Large windows
- Baggage facilities: Below the seats

Technical
- Rolling stock: 2
- Track gauge: Broad
- Operating speed: Avg 36 km/h (22 mph)
Route map
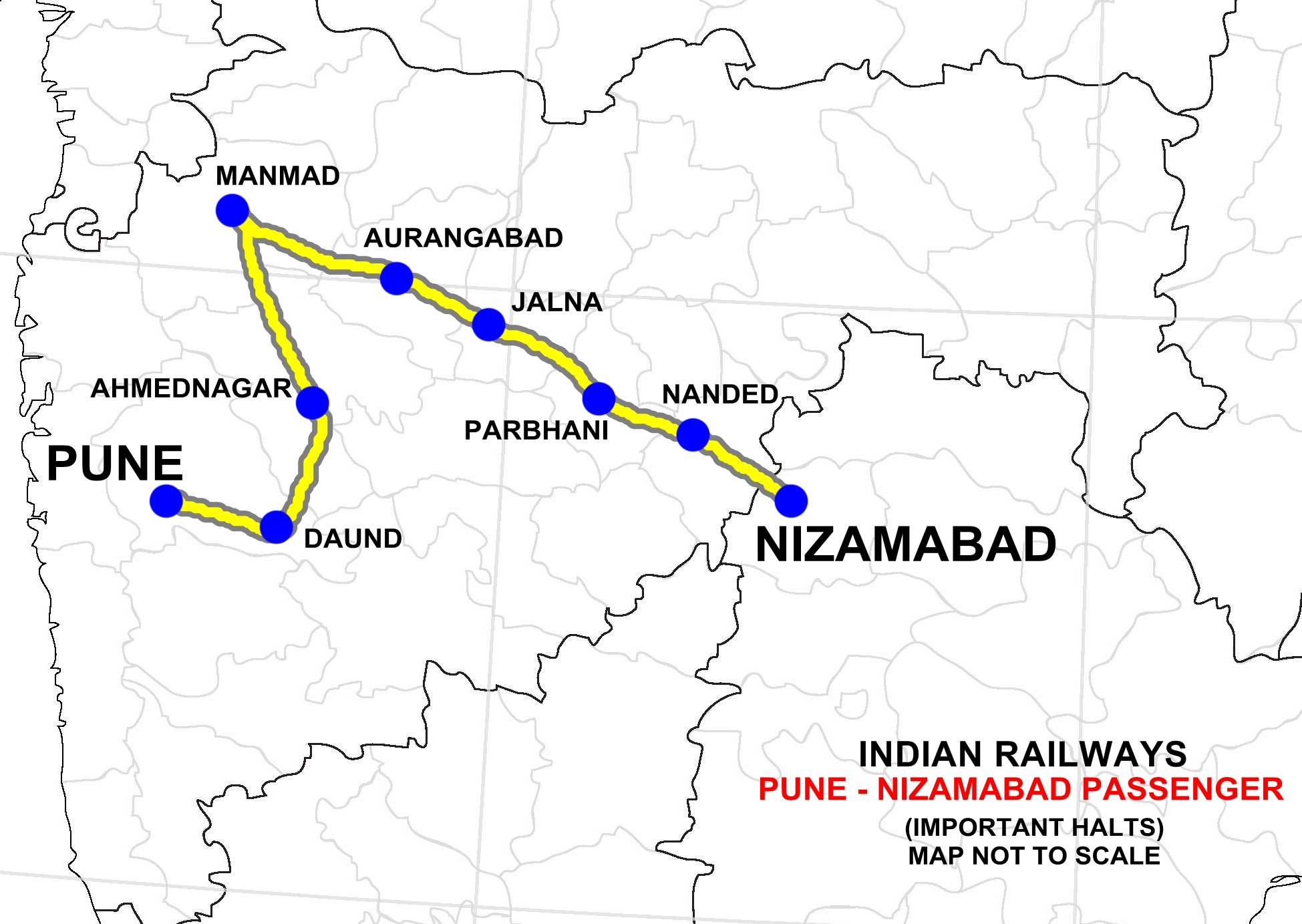

The Nizamabad – Pune passenger is a long distance daily passenger train that runs between the cities of Nizamabad in Telangana and Pune in Maharashtra state. The train starts from Nizamabad Junction and partially runs on Secunderabad–Manmad line.

== Service ==
The train 51422 starts from Nizamabad railway station at 23:40 IST daily, covering the distance of 774 kilometers in 21 hours and 15 minutes, and halts at all the 75 intermediate stations before reaching Pune at 21:00 IST the next night. On the return journey the train 51421 departs Pune Junction at 14:25 IST and arrives Nizamabad at 10:20 IST the next morning.

=== Important halts ===
1. Nizamabad
2. Hazur Sahib Nanded
3. Purna
4. Parbhani
5. Jalna
6. Chhatrapati Sambhajinagar
7. Manmad
8. Ahilyanagar
9. Daund
10. Pune

== See also ==
- Nizamabad–Peddapalli section
- Devagiri Express
