= KSR Bengaluru–Hazur Sahib Nanded Express =

Train in India

Hazur Sahib Nanded-KSR Bengaluru City Express
Overview
- Service type: Express
- First service: 1 December 1993; 32 years ago
- Current operator: South Western Railway

Route
- Termini: Hazur Sahib Nanded (NED); KSR Bengaluru City (SBC)
- Stops: 41
- Distance travelled: 1,031 km (641 mi)
- Average journey time: 24 hours 17 minutes
- Service frequency: Daily
- Train number: 16593 / 16594

On-board services
- Classes: AC 2 Tier, AC 3 Tier, Sleeper Class & General Unreserved
- Seating arrangements: Yes
- Sleeping arrangements: Yes
- Catering facilities: Available but no pantry car
- Observation facilities: Large windows
- Baggage facilities: No
- Other facilities: Below the seats

Technical
- Rolling stock: LHB coach
- Track gauge: 1,676 mm (5 ft 6 in)
- Operating speed: 47 km/h (29 mph) average including halts.
Route map
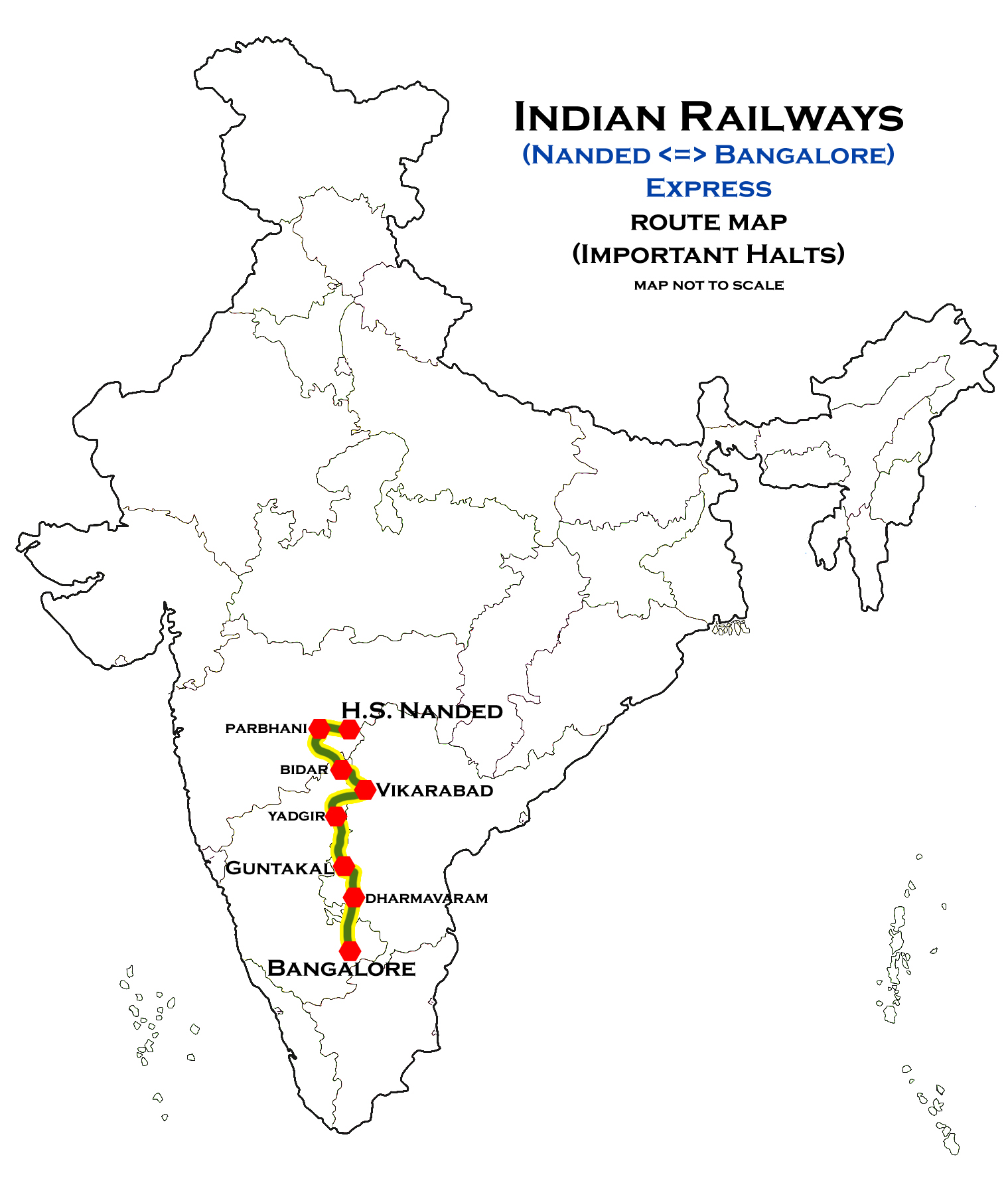

The 16593 / 16594 Hazur Sahib Nanded-KSR Bengaluru City Express is an express train belonging to Indian Railways-South Western Railway zone that runs between Hazur Sahib Nanded and KSR Bengaluru in India.

== Background ==
This train was introduced in 1993 as Bidar Link Express, It was the only one train connecting Bangalore and Bidar at that time. It was extended to Nanded after few months since Nanded lacked a direct train to Bangalore. In 1996, this train was attached to this train as the Hampi Express which connects between Hubli and Mysore later it became a separate train in 2010.

== Service ==
It operates as train number 16594 from Hazur Sahib Nanded to Bangalore City and as train number 16593 in the reverse direction, serving the states of Maharashtra, Andhra Pradesh, Telangana & Karnataka. The train covers the distance of 1,031 km (641 mi) in 24 hours 17 mins approximately at a speed of (42.6 km/h (26.5 mph)).

== Coaches ==
The 16593 / 94 Hazur Sahib Nanded–Bangalore City Express used to run with ICF coach. Now they are upgraded to LHB coach it has one First AC, three AC 3-tier, nine sleeper class, four general unreserved & two SLR (seating with luggage rake) coaches. It doesn't carry a pantry car.

As with most train services in India, coach composition may be amended at the discretion of Indian Railways depending on demand.

== Routing ==
The 16593 / 94 Hazur Sahib Nanded Bangalore City Express runs from Hazur Sahib Nanded via Parbhani Junction, Latur Road junction, Vikarabad, Raichur, Guntakal Junction, Gooty Junction, Dharmavaram Junction to KSR Bengaluru

== Traction ==
Earlier WDM-3A used run this train. As the route is fully electrified, a Krishnarajapuram Loco Shed-based electric WAP-7 electric locomotive pulls the train from Bengaluru to Nanded and vice-versa.
