= Bidar–Nanded Railway Line =

Proposed railway line in India

Bidar–Nanded line

Overview
- Status: Proposed
- Owner: Indian Railways
- Locale: Karnataka and Maharashtra, India
- Termini: Bidar; Nanded

Service
- System: Indian Railways
- Operator: South Central Railway

Technical
- Line length: 155 km (96 mi)
- Track gauge: 5 ft 6 in (1,676 mm) broad gauge

The Bidar–Nanded railway line (also known as the Bidar–Nanded rail project) is a proposed railway route connecting Bidar in Karnataka and Nanded in Maharashtra via Aurad in Karnataka.
