= Bidar–Kalaburagi rail line =

Overview
- Status: Operational
- Owner: Indian Railways
- Locale: Karnataka, India
- Termini: Bidar; Kalaburagi Junctionf
- Stations: 11

Service
- Type: Regional rail
- System: Indian Railways
- Operator: South Central Railway

History
- Opened: August 2015 (partial DEMU service); 29 October 2017 (fully operational)

Technical
- Line length: 72.26 km (44.90 mi)
- Track gauge: 5 ft 6 in (1,676 mm)

The Bidar–Kalaburagi rail line is a 72.26 km (44.90 mi) long, single-track broad-gauge railway line in the Indian state of Karnataka. It connects Bidar and Kalaburagi (formerly Gulbarga), providing a direct rail link for the Kalyana-Karnataka region. After a prolonged development period affected by funding and land acquisition issues, with a final project cost of ₹1,462 crore, the line was fully inaugurated in October 2017. The line is operated by the South Central Railway zone.

== History ==
The proposal for a direct railway line was initially sanctioned in the 1996-97 railway budget. The project subsequently stalled for years due to lack of funding. By December 2004, Members of Parliament were questioning the government in the Lok Sabha, demanding funds be allocated for its "early completion". The official response from the Ministry of Railways stated that the project was pending due to "resource constraints".

A final location survey was completed by 2009. The project was approved anew in the 2010-11 budget. The foundation stone for a station and goods shed at Sultanpur was laid by then Railway Minister Mallikarjun Kharge on 27 October 2013.

By 2014, business leaders stated the lack of connectivity was affecting growth in the region. The project cost increased from ₹450 crore in 2014 to ₹1,050 crore by 2015, and further to ₹1,150 crore by 2016. Officials attributed the increases to land acquisition challenges and alignment change demands. The project also became a subject of political debate.

By early 2017, 59% of the work was completed. The line was inaugurated by Prime Minister Narendra Modi on 29 October 2017, with a final project cost of ₹1,462 crore. As of December 2023, the project was officially reported as completed and operational by the Ministry of Railways.

== Route and specifications ==
The 72.26 km (44.90 mi) long, single broad-gauge line originates at Bidar (station code: BIDR) and terminates at Kalaburagi Junction (KLBG). It passes through the following 11 stations: Bidar, Hunsihadalli (HSHL), Hira (HIRA), Taj Sultanpur (TSPR), Kamalapur (KMPR), Dudhani (DODI), Hotgi Road (HGRD), Sonala (SNL), Sedam (SEM), Malkhed (MLK), and Kalaburagi Junction.

== Operation ==
Initial Diesel Electric Multiple Unit (DEMU) services (Train numbers 77651/77652) began operation on a partially completed section as early as August 2015. The line was fully inaugurated in October 2017.

Following inauguration, the line operated with limited service. A 2020 report noted the line had one train per day with irregular scheduling.

Service frequency increased in October 2023 with the introduction of the daily Kalyana Karnataka Express, which connects the region to Bengaluru via this line. The line is operated by the South Central Railway zone.

== Future development ==
In the 2018-19 Railway Budget, the line was identified for future development, with plans announced for its doubling (adding a second track) and electrification. However, as of December 2023, an official parliamentary document stated that "at present, no proposal... is under consideration with the Ministry of Railways" for the doubling of this line.

== Impact ==
The railway line reduces travel time between Bidar and Kalaburagi from nearly four hours by road to about 90 minutes (5,400 s) by train. At the inauguration, the Prime Minister stated the line would "give impetus to the overall development of the region and help in providing seamless connectivity to the people of Karnataka and the neighbouring regions." The line serves the Kalyana-Karnataka region.

== See also ==
- Transport in Karnataka
- Rail transport in Karnataka
- List of railway lines in India
- South Central Railway zone
- Kalaburagi Junction railway station
- Bidar railway station
