= Secunderabad railway division =

Railway division of India

Secunderabad Railway Division
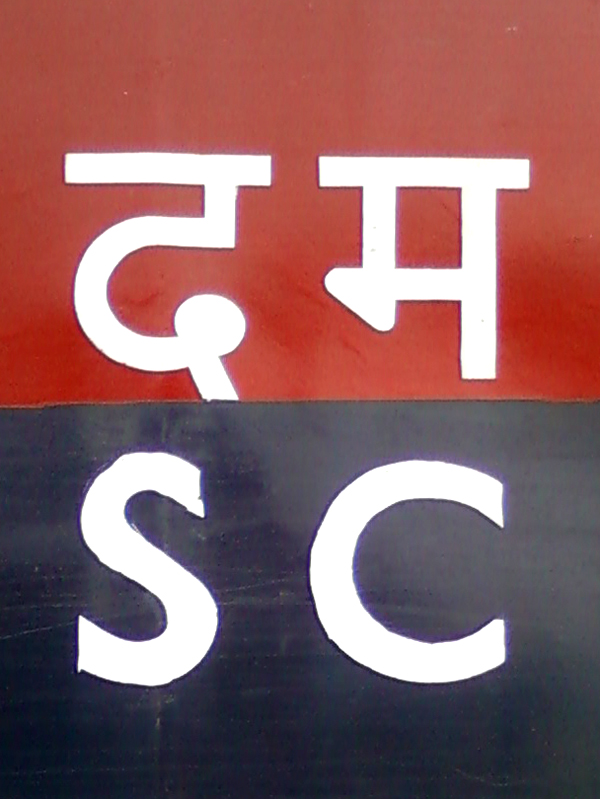

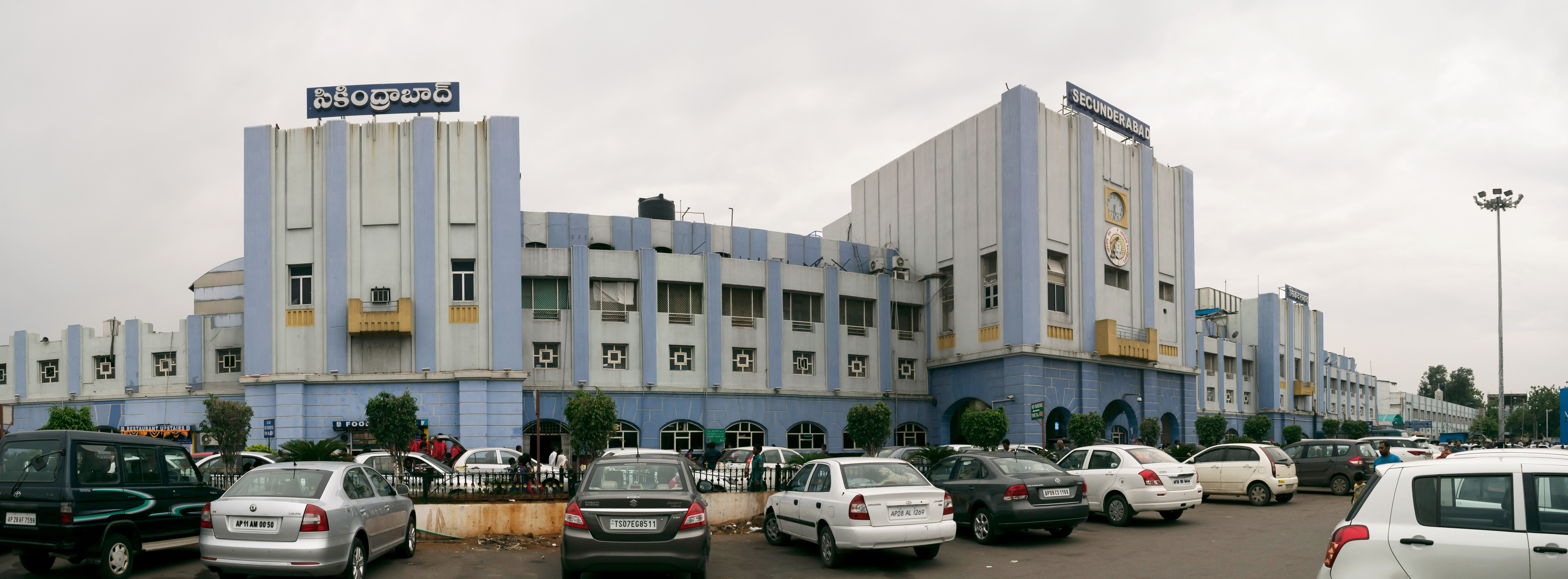
- Secunderabad Junction railway station

Overview
- Operator: Indian Railways
- Headquarters: Secunderabad
- Reporting mark: SC
- Locale: Telangana State, India
- Dates of operation: 1966; 60 years ago–
- Predecessor: Southern Railway zone

Technical
- Length: 1,488 km (925 mi)

Other
- Website: www.scr.indianrailways.gov.in

Secunderabad railway division (abbreviated : SCR) is one of the three divisions of South Central Railway zone of the Indian Railways. Its divisional and zonal headquarters are located at Secunderabad.

== History ==
Secunderabad division was formed on 1 October 1966. It had broad gauge and meter gauge, later, meter gauge was a part of Hyderabad division.

== Routes ==
It covers the states of Telangana, Andhra Pradesh, Karnataka and Maharashtra.

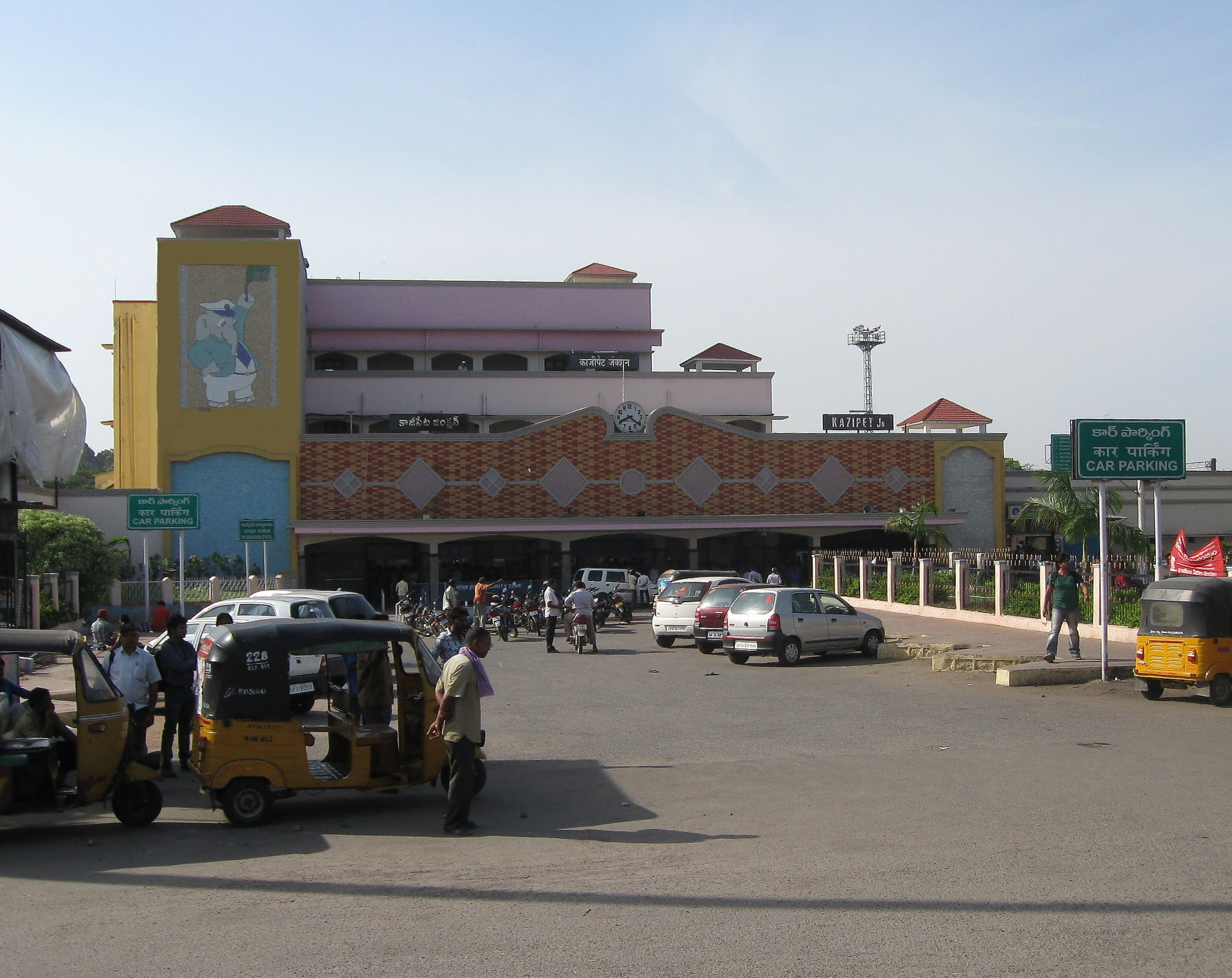
Kazipet railway station

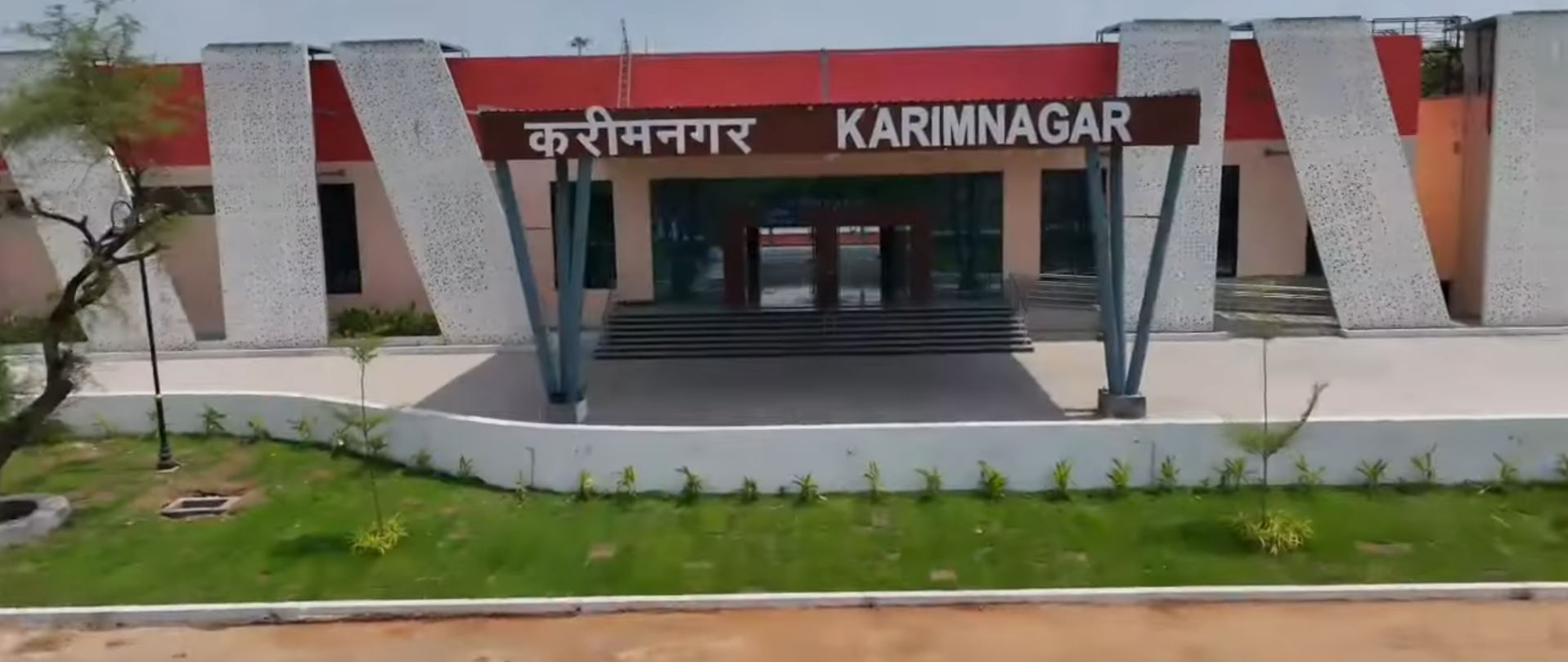
Karimnagar Railway Station

The following are the sections under the division.

Section	Type of track	Traction	Distance
Kazipet Jn-Balharshah Jn(excl)(B.G.)	Triple & Double	Electric	231.860 km
Kazipet Jn- Motumari (B.G.)	Triple & Double	Electric	158.140 km
Secunderabad Jn-Kazipet Jn (B.G.)	Double	Electric	130.530 km
Pagidipalli Jn- Vishnupuram Jn (B.G.)	Single	Electric	134.380 km
Sanathnagar Jn- Moula Ali Bye-Pass line(B.G.)	Double	Electric	22.030 km
Secunderabad Jn-Wadi Jn(excl) (B.G.)	Double	Electric	186.160 km
Hussain Sagar Jn-Hyderabad Jn(excl) (B.G.)	Double	Electric	5.20 km
wadi Jn(excl)-Raichur Jn (B.G.)	Double	Electric	107.50 km
Secunderabad Jn-Wadi Jn(excl) (B.G.)	Double	Electric	186.160 km
Vishnupuram- Motumari (B.G.)	Single	Electric	88.818 km
Dornakal Jn- Bhadrachalam Road(B.G.)	Single	Electric	54.650 km
Bhadrachalam Road- Manuguru(B.G.)	Single	Electric	49.040 km
Peddapalli Jn- Karimnagar- Nizamabad Jn(excl)(B.G.)	Single	Electric	177.794 km
Vikarabad Jn-latur road Jn-Parli vaijnath(B.G.)	Single	Electric	267.770 km
Bidar-Kalaburgi line(Khanapur Jn-Taj sultanpur(excl))(B.G)	Single	Electric	97.700 km
Bhadrachalam Road- Sattupalli(B.G)	Single	Electric	51.516 km
Manikgarh-Gadchandur(B.G.)	Single	Electric	28.650 km
Karepalli-Singareni(B.G.)	Single	Electric	10.360 km
Kazipet Bye-Pass(B.G.)	Single	Electric	1.300 km
Hussain Sagar Bye-Pass(B.G.)	Single	Electric	0.640 km
Dornakal Jn Bye-Pass(B.G.)	Single	Electric	1.360 km
Bhadrachalam Road Bye-Pass(B.G.)	Single	Electric	1.700 km
Manikgarh Bye-Pass(B.G.)	Single	Electric	2.860 km
Motumari Bye-Pass(B.G.)	Single	Electric	1.870 km
Wadi Jn Bye-Pass(B.G.)	Double	Electric	12.025 km
Peddapalli Bye-Pass(B.G.)	Single	Electric	1.970 km
Total			1836.858 km Route

== See also ==
- Divisions of Indian Railways
