= Latur–Miraj section =

Train section in Maharashtra, India

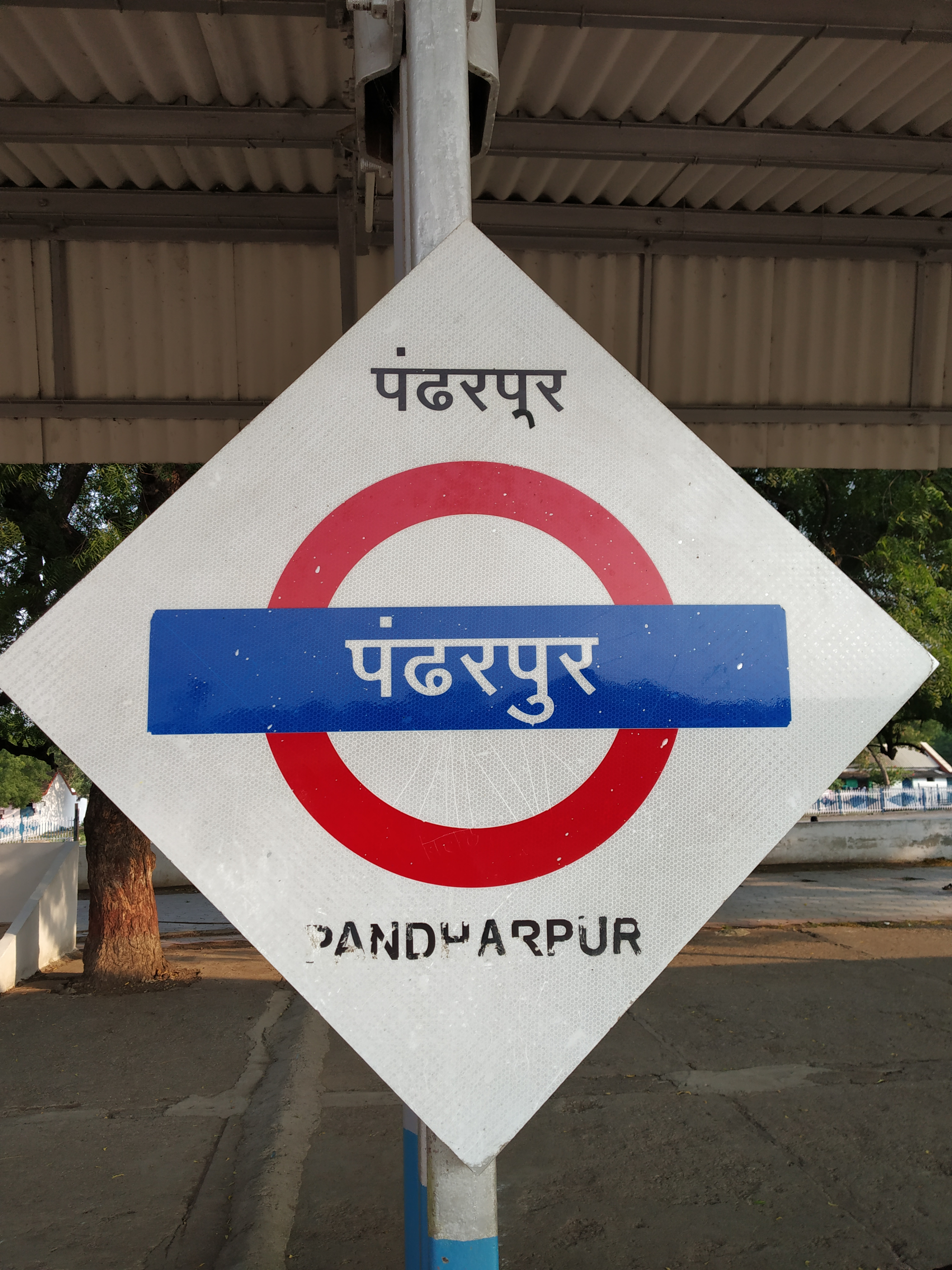
- Pandharpur railway station platformboard

Overview
- Other name(s): Barsi Light Railway
- Owner: Indian Railways

History
- Opened: 1897

Technical
- Line length: 341.94 km (212.47 mi)
- Track gauge: 5 ft 6 in (1,676 mm) broad gauge
- Old gauge: 2 ft 6 in (762 mm) narrow gauge (1897-1931) metre gauge (1931-2008)
- Electrification: Yes

The Latur–Miraj section of the Indian Railways is a 342 km (213 mi) link from Latur to Miraj. It falls under the administration of the Solapur railway division of Central Railway zone of Indian Railways.

The Barsi Light Railway on the route with a track gauge of 2 ft 6 in (762 mm) opened in 1897. It was converted to metre-gauge between 1929 and 1931 as part of the Great Indian Peninsula Railway. The section was converted from metre gauge to broad gauge in 2007–2008. The Kurduwadi–Latur–Latur Road line will be electrified as per union railway budget 2014–15 & completed electrification in 2023.
