= Latur railway station =

Railway station in Maharashtra, India

- Latur railway station

General information
- Location: Arvi, Latur, Maharashtra; India
- System: Indian Railway Station
- Owner: Indian Railways
- Operator: Central Railways
- Line: Latur–Miraj section,
- Platforms: 2
- Tracks: 4
- Connections: Auto Rickshaw, Taxi stand

Construction
- Structure type: Standard (on ground station)
- Parking: Available
- Accessible: Available

Other information
- Status: Functioning
- Station code: LUR
- Zone(s): Central Railway zone
- Division(s): Solapur

History
- Opened: 1897; 129 years ago
- Rebuilt: 2006; 20 years ago

Passengers
- Daily: 30000 (Approximately)
Location
- Location within Maharashtra Location within India

Latur railway station (Station Code: LUR) is a railway station in Central Railway zone which serves the city of Latur, Maharashtra. It is the start of the Latur–Miraj section of the Solapur (SUR) Division of Central Railway (CR). Latur is well connected to Latur Road Junction, Parli Vaijnath, Purna, Hingoli, Washim, Akola, Amravati, Wardha, Nagpur, Nanded, Nizamabad, Dharashiv, Pune, Lonavala, Karjat, Panvel, Thane, Kalyan, Mumbai, sangli, Pandharpur, Miraj, Kolhapur, Udgir, Bidar, Vikarabad, Secunderabad, Hyderabad, Yeshwantpur, Bangalore.

== Marathwada Railway Coach Factory, Latur ==
Indian Railways decided to set up a metro and rail coach manufacturing facility in Latur in Maharashtra. The project is likely it entail investment of more than Rs 1,500 crore.

== Express trains ==
- Latur–Mumbai SF Express
- Kazipet – Hadapsar Express
- Panvel–Hazur Sahib Nanded Express
- Nagpur– SCSMT Kolhapur Express
- Yesvantpur–Latur Express
- Deekshabhoomi Express
- Mumbai CSMT–Bidar Superfast Express
- Pune–Amravati Express(via Latur)
- SANGLI - PARLI DEMU EXPRESS
- Pandharpur – Tirupati Express
- Nizamabad – Pandharpur Express (UR)
- LTT Mumbai - Solapur Express

== Jaldoot Express ==
For the first time in Maharashtra history, due to the drought the Latur city faced for three consecutive years, the summer of 2016 presented itself with extreme scarcity of water. To overcome this issue, a joint project was then requested by Railway Minister Suresh Prabhu and Maharashtra Chief Minister Devendra Fadnavis. After further research, and many changes in plan, Miraj was chosen to transport water to Latur from 342 km away. The "Jaldoot" train made its first experimental run on 11 April 2016, carrying 10 tanker wagons, each filled with 50,000 liters of water. Over 250,000 litres of water were transported, and the program was and continues to be a success.

== Electrification ==
The Kurduwadi–Latur–Latur Road line will be electrified as per union railway budget 2014–15.

== Line and location ==
The railway track in the Kurduwadi–Latur Road sector will be doubled at a cost of Rs. 700 crore. Indian Railways also has plans for extending the railway line from Latur Road to Bodhan which in turn will pave way for Latur to have direct connectivity to Nizamabad, Warangal, Vishakapatnam, Adilabad many other cities of Telangana which are located in neighbouring state of Telangana.

== Other stations in Latur ==
The other stations that serve the city of Latur are

- Latur Road Junction
- Harangul railway station
