= Osmanabad railway station =

Railway Station in Maharashtra, India

Osmanabad railway station Dharashiv railway station
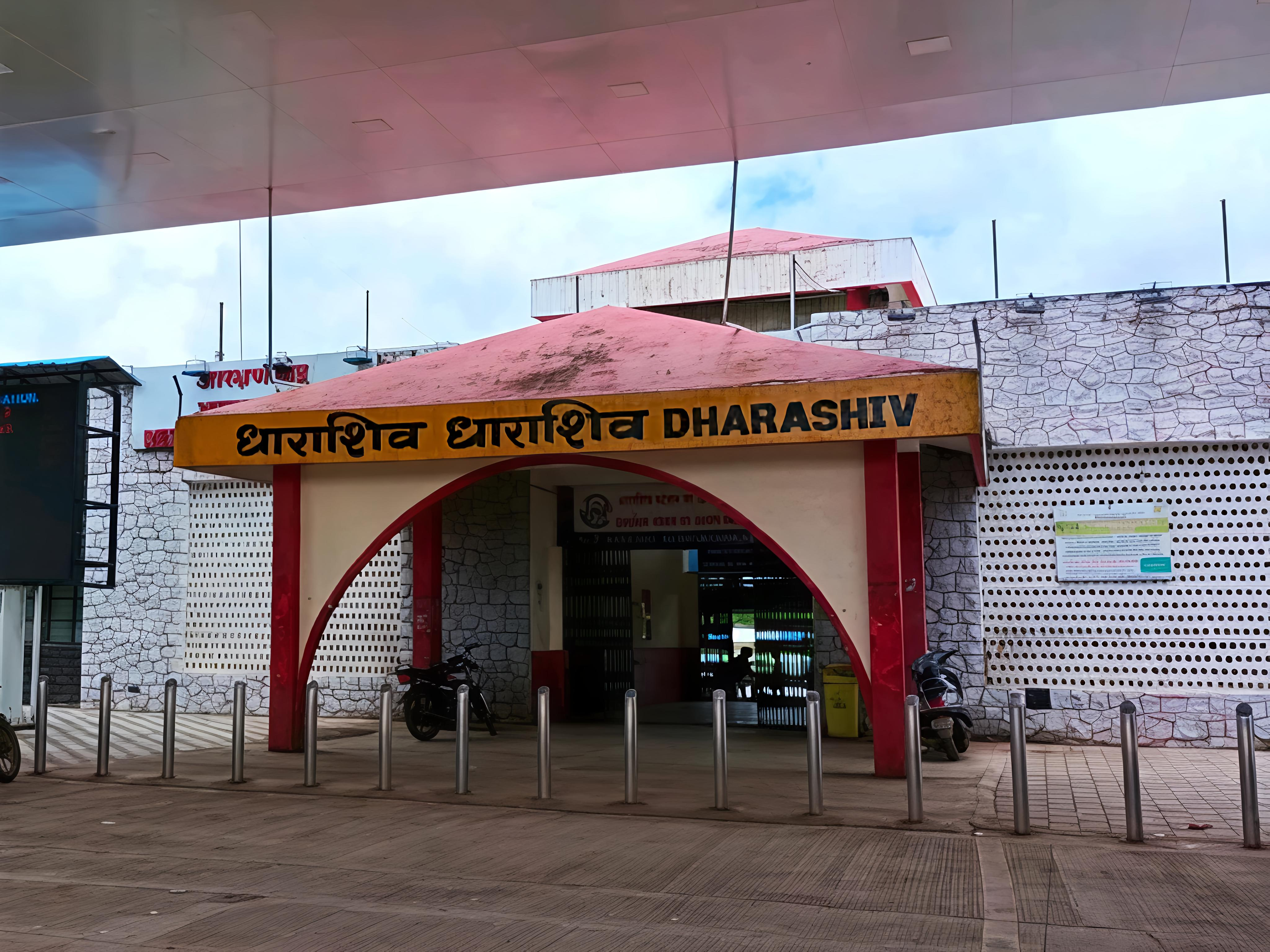

General information
- Location: National Highway 52, Osmanabad, Maharashtra; India
- Coordinates: 18.247891°N 76.0206763°E
- Elevation: 679 metres (2,228 ft)
- System: Indian Railway Station
- Owner: Indian Railways
- Operator: Central Railways
- Lines: Latur–Miraj section, Solapur–Tuljapur-Osmanabad line(under construction )
- Platforms: 2
- Tracks: 4

Construction
- Structure type: Standard on ground
- Parking: Yes
- Accessible: Available

Other information
- Status: Active
- Station code: DRSV, formerly UMD
- Zone(s): Central Railway zone
- Division(s): Solapur

History
- Opened: 2006

Passengers
- 10000 daily approx
Location
- Location within Maharashtra Location within India

Osmanabad railway station, officially Dharashiv railway station (station code: DRSV), situated on Latur Road Junction–Miraj Junction line of Central Railway.

Osmanabad is well connected by railway to Mumbai, Pune, Daund, Kolhapur, Kurduvadi Junction, Miraj, Pandharpur, Latur, Parli Vaijnath, Parbhani, Nanded, Nagpur, Akola, Hyderabad, Nizamabad, Barshi, Bidar, Hyderabad & Udgir.

== History ==
Before 2004, a narrow-gauge track connecting Latur to Kurduvadi was passing through Osmanabad district. Yedshi was nearest station for Osmanabad which was 18 km away from Osmanabad City. During the gauge conversion from narrow gauge to broad gauge, then Chief Minister Vilasrao Deshmukh decided to change the track alignment and directed towards Osmanabad city and Latur–Kurudvadi broad-gauge route is passed through Osmanabad. In first step broad-gauge track between Latur–Osmanabad was completed and it became functional in 2007. First train arrived at Osmanabad railway station was Mumbai–Osmanabad Express. That train continued for one year via Aurangabad, Manmad. Later on in next year Osmanabad–Kurudvadi track was completed and it became functional in same year that is 2008. Latur–Mumbai Express was started via Kurduvadi, Pune in 2008. Nowadays, Osmanabad is well connected by rail to all important cities in Maharashtra and India.

On 4 June 2025, the station was renamed Dharashiv railway station after the Dharashiv caves.
