= Parbhani Junction railway station =

Railway Station in Maharashtra, India

Parbhani Junction
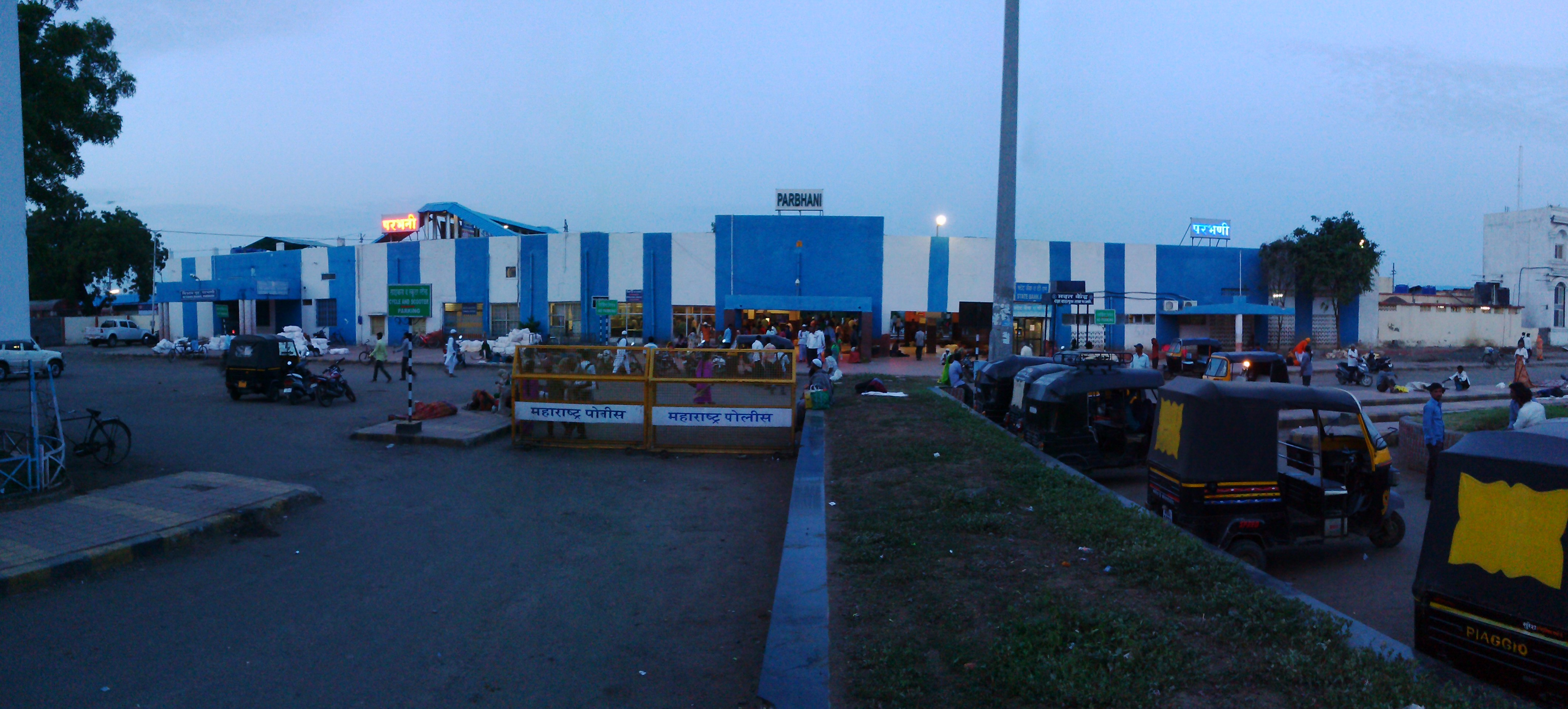

General information
- Location: Near District Court, Parbhani, Maharashtra; India
- Coordinates: 19.2574°N 76.7740°E
- Elevation: 411 metres (1,348 ft)
- System: Indian Railways station
- Owner: Indian Railways
- Line: Secunderabad–Manmad line Parbhani-Parli Vaijnath section
- Platforms: 3
- Tracks: 8

Construction
- Structure type: At grade
- Parking: Yes
- Cycle facilities: Yes
- Accessible: Available

Other information
- Status: Functioning
- Station code: PBN
- Zone(s): South Central Railway
- Division(s): Nanded

History
- Opened: 1860
- Rebuilt: 2003
Location
- Location within Maharashtra Location within India

Parbhani Junction railway station (railway code PBN) located in Parbhani. It is the main railway station of Parbhani City & District. The station comes under Nanded railway division. It is an A-1 Category Station. The station is situated on Secunderabad–Manmad section of South Central Railway zone. The city has good connectivity to major cities of Maharashtra such as Aurangabad, Mumbai, Nagpur, Pune, Nanded, Nashik, Kolhapur, Shirdi, Pandharpur. It is also well connected to other Indian cities like New Delhi, Hyderabad, Visakhapatnam, Secunderabad, Bangalore, Bhopal, Surat, Ahmedabad, Okha, Amritsar, Agra, Jaipur, Tirupati, Rameswaram. Sachkhand Express, Nagarsol-Narsapur Express, Devagiri Express, Marathwada Sampark Kranti Express, Hazur Sahib Nanded-Panvel Express, Tirupati Weekly Express, Rameswaram Weekly Express are some important trains passing through here and these trains connect this city with various cities mentioned above

== Trains ==
Some of the trains that call on Parbhani Junction are:

- Panvel–Hazur Sahib Nanded Express
- Pune-Amravati Express (via Latur)
- Parbhani–Nanded Special Express
- Ajanta Express
- Adilabad Parli Vaijnath Passenger (unreserved)
- Akola Parli Vaijnath Passenger (unreserved)
- Aurangabad–Tirupati Express
- Aurangabad–Hazur Sahib Nanded Express
- Aurangabad-Hyderabad Express
- Nagpur–CSMT Kolhapur Express
- Chennai–Nagarsol Express
- Daund–Nizamabad Express
- Deekshabhoomi Express
- Devagiri Express
- Marathwada Express
- Hazur Sahib Nanded–Bangalore City Express
- Pune–Nanded Express (via Manmad)
- Hyderabad–Purna Express
- Kacheguda–Nagarsol Express
- Sainagar Shirdi–Kakinada Port Express
- Narasapur–Nagarsol Express (via Guntur)
- Narasapur–Nagarsol Express (via Warangal)
- Nandigram Express
- Nizamabad–Pandharpur Passenger
- Nizamabad–Pune Passenger
- Rameswaram–Okha Express
- Parli Vaijnath–Purna Passenger (unreserved)
- Sachkhand Express
- Tirupati–Sainagar Shirdi Express
- Sainagar Shirdi–Secunderabad Express
- Sainagar Shirdi–Visakhapatnam Express
- Sainagar Shirdi–Vijayawada Express
- Tapovan Express
- Firozpur Cantt. - Hazur Sahib Nanded Weekly Express
