= Vikarabad Junction railway station =

Railway station in Telangana, India

Vikarabad Junction
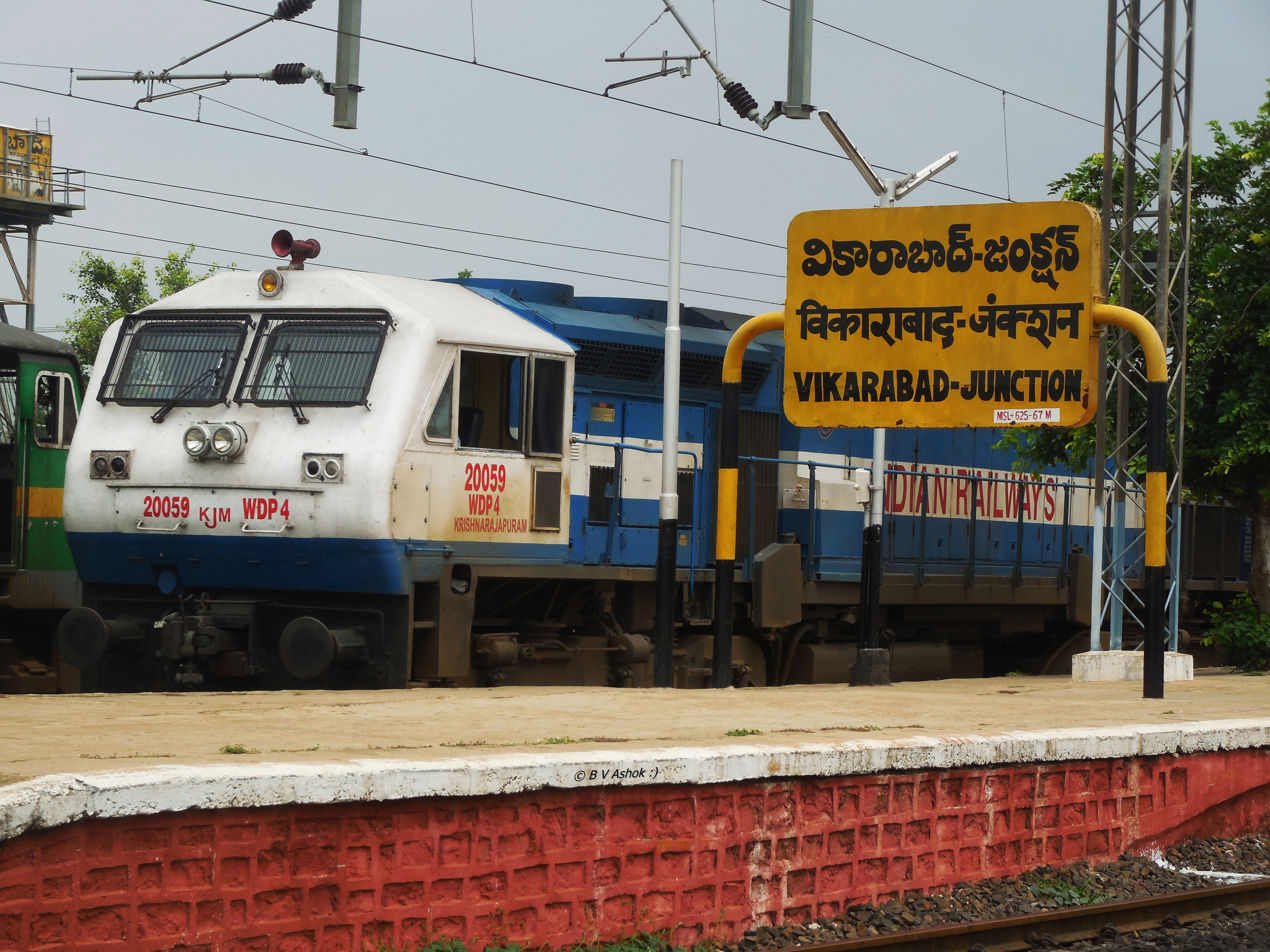

General information
- Location: Railway Station Rd, Vikarabad, Ranga Reddy district, Telangana; India
- Coordinates: 17°20′15″N 77°54′36″E
- Elevation: 633 m (2,077 ft)
- System: Indian Railways junction station
- Owner: Indian Railways
- Lines: Begumpet–Wadi and Vikarabad–Parli Vaijnath
- Platforms: 3
- Tracks: 5 ft 6 in (1,676 mm) broad gauge

Construction
- Structure type: At grade
- Parking: Available

Other information
- Status: Functioning
- Station code: VKB
- Zone(s): South Central Railway
- Division(s): Secunderabad
Location
- Location within Telangana Location within India

Vikarabad railway station is an Indian Railways station in the town of Vikarabad in Telangana. It is located on the Vikarabad–Parli section of Secunderabad railway division in South Central Railway zone.

== History ==
The Wadi–Secunderabad line was built in 1874 with financing by the Nizam of Hyderabad. It later became part of Nizam's Guaranteed State Railway.Over time, it has become a key railway junction for passenger and freight traffic.

== Infrastructure ==
The station has 3 platforms, all of which are well-maintained and can handle long-haul trains. The station has Waiting rooms, Reservation counters for ticket bookings. Parking area for two-wheelers and four-wheelers. Basic amenities like drinking water, clean toilets, and food stalls. Digital display boards and announcement systems for train schedules. The station is undergoing Modernisation as part of the Ministry of Railways' ambitious Amrit Bharat Station Scheme
