= Parli Vaijnath railway station =

Railway Station in Maharashtra, India

Parli Vaijnath
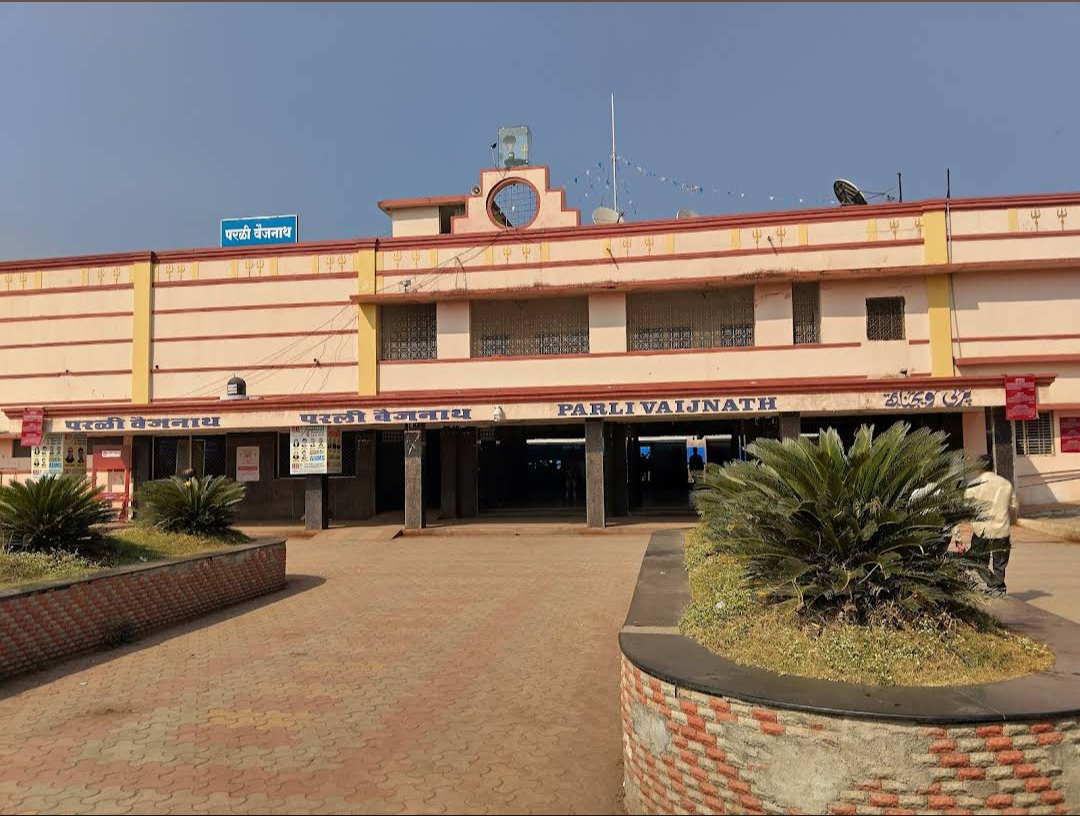

General information
- Location: Main Road, Near Ekminar Masjid, Parli Vaijnath, Maharashtra; India
- Coordinates: 18.8528°N 76.5251°E
- Elevation: 461 metres (1,512 ft)
- System: Indian Railways station
- Owner: Indian Railways
- Operator: South Central Railway
- Line: Parli Vaijnath-Vikarabad line Parbhani-Parli Vaijnath Section
- Platforms: 3 (4 and 5 is under construction)
- Tracks: 4
- Connections: Auto stand,Taxi Stand

Construction
- Structure type: Standard (on-ground station)
- Parking: yes
- Cycle facilities: yes

Other information
- Status: Functioning
- Station code: PRLI
- Zone(s): South Central Railway
- Division(s): Secunderabad
Location
- Location within India Location within Maharashtra

Parli Vaijnath railway station is a railway station in Beed district in the Indian state of Maharashtra. It serves Parli Vaijnath city.

== Platforms ==
The station consists of three sheltered platforms, with an elevator on platform 1.

== Connections ==
Parli Vaijnath is connected to Hyderabad, Nizamabad, Dharashiv, Manmad, Kakinada, Machilipatnam, Vijayawada, Rajahmundry, Khammam, Guntur, Tirupati, Warangal, Ch.Sambhaji Nagar, Jalna, Latur, Parbhani, Purna, Nanded, Vikarabad, Zaheerabad, Bidar, Latur Road, Raichur, Guntakal, Mumbai, Panvel, Pune, Sangli, Kolhapur, Shirdi, Bengaluru, Nagpur, and Dhanbad.

== Trains ==
=== Originates ===
- Parli Vaijnath-Adilabad Passenger (unreserved)
- Parli Vaijnath-Sangli DEMU Express
- Parli Vaijnath-Akola Passenger (unreserved)
- Parli Vaijnath-Purna Passenger (unreserved)

=== Passing through ===
The following trains pass through Parli Vaijnath railway station:

- Panvel-Hazur Sahib Nanded Express (via Latur)
- Aurangabad-Tirupati Weekly Express
- Aurangabad-Guntur Express (via Bidar Kacheguda, Mahbubnagar, Kurnool)
- Chhatrapati Shahu Maharaj Terminus, Kolhapur-Nagpur Express (via Latur, Hingoli)
- Hazur Sahib Nanded-KSR Bengaluru City Express
- Hyderabad-Purna Passenger
- Nizamabad-Pandharpur Passenger
- Sainagar Shirdi-Secunderabad Express
- Sainagar Shirdi-Machilipatnam Express
- Sainagar Shirdi-Kakinada Port Express
- Deekshabhoomi Express
- Amravati-Pune di-Weekly Special Express ( via Hingoli, Parli Vaijnath, Latur, Osmanabad, Daund)
- Aurangabad-Tirupati Weekly Special Express (via Bidar,Vikarabad, Raichur,Guntakal, and Kadapa)
- Purna Jn-Tirupati weekly special Express (via Parli Vaijnath, Bidar, Secundrabad, Nalgonda, Guntur, Ongole, Nellore)
