= Latur Road railway station =

Railway station in Maharashtra, India

Latur Road Junction

General information
- Location: National Highway 361, Latur Road, Maharashtra; India
- Coordinates: 18.5089°N 76.8447°E
- Elevation: 197.51 metres (648.0 ft)
- System: Indian Railways station
- Owner: Indian Railways
- Operator: South Central Railways
- Line: Khanapur–Latur road section Miraj-Latur Road section Latur Road–Parli vaijnath section
- Platforms: 3
- Tracks: 8
- Connections: Auto stand

Construction
- Structure type: Standard (on-ground station)
- Parking: Yes
- Cycle facilities: Yes

Other information
- Status: Functioning
- Station code: LTRR
- Zone(s): South Central Railway zone
- Division(s): Secunderabad

History
- Opened: 1905
- Rebuilt: 2007
Location
- Location within Maharashtra Location within India

Latur Road Junction railway station is a main railway station in Latur district, Maharashtra. It falls under the Secunderabad railway division in the south central railway zone. It serves Chakur city and has three platforms.

== Trains ==
Notable trains include:

- Sainagar Shirdi–Vijayawada Express
- Sainagar Shirdi–Kakinada Port Express
- Sainagar Shirdi–Secunderabad Express
- Hyderabad–Aurangabad Passenger
- Mumbai CSMT–Bidar Superfast Express
- KSR Bengaluru-Hazur Sahib Nanded Express
- Aurangabad–Tirupati Express
- Panvel–Hazur Sahib Nanded Express
- Deekshabhoomi Express
- Yesvantpur-Latur Express
