= Bidar railway station =

Railway station in Karnataka, India

Bidar
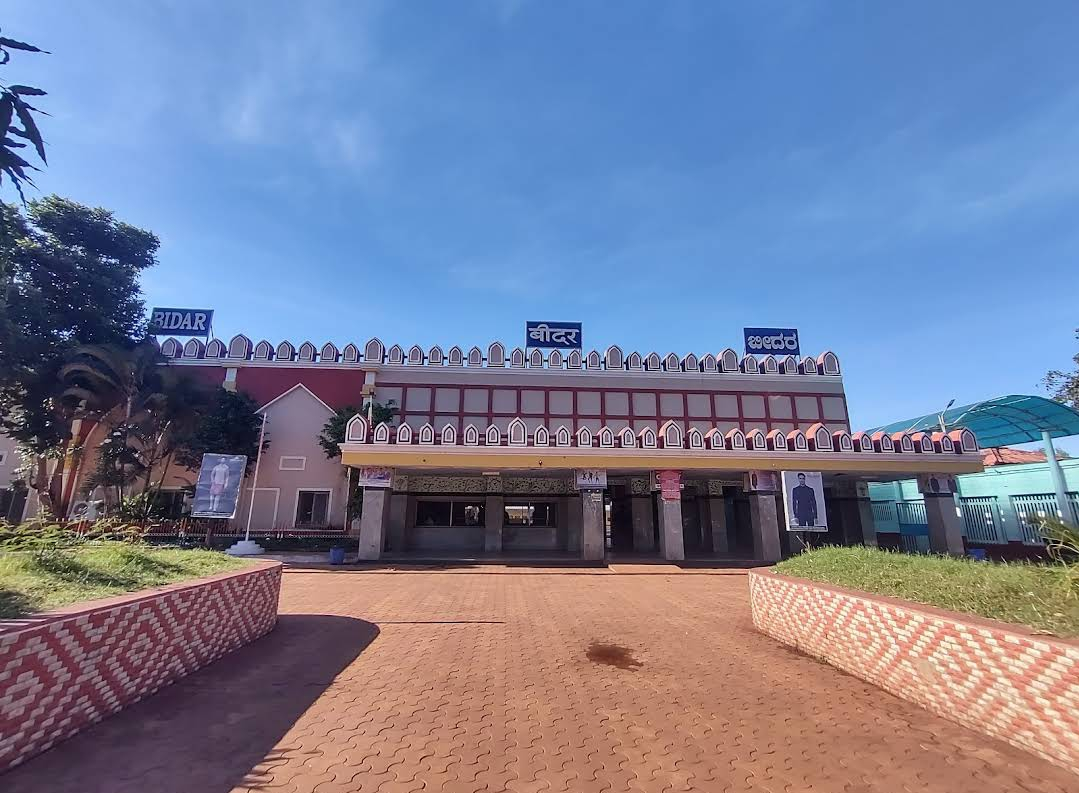

General information
- Location: State Highway 15, Bidar, Karnataka; India
- Coordinates: 17°54′42″N 77°30′55″E
- Elevation: 673 metres (2,208 ft)
- System: Indian Railway Station
- Owner: Indian Railways
- Operator: South Central Railway
- Lines: Vikrabad–Bidar-Latur Road branch line; Bidar–Kalaburagi line; Bidar–Nanded line (proposed line); Bidar–Bodhan line (proposed line)
- Platforms: 3
- Tracks: 5

Construction
- Structure type: Standard on ground
- Parking: Yes
- Cycle facilities: Yes

Other information
- Status: Functioning
- Station code: BIDR
- Division(s): Secunderabad

History
- Opened: 1932
Location
- Location within Karnataka

Bidar railway station (Station code: BIDR) is located in Bidar district in the Indian state of Karnataka and serves Bidar.

== History ==
The Great Indian Peninsula Railway extended its Mumbai–Solapur line to Raichur in 1871. The Wadi–Secunderabad line was built in 1874. The Vikrabad–Bidar 5 ft 6 in (1,676 mm) broad gauge line was opened in 1932.

Construction of the 110-km Gulbarga–Bidar link was completed and inaugurated by Prime minister Narendra Modi on 29 October 2017.

== Amenities ==
Bidar railway station has a Tourist Information Centre, computerized reservation counter, waiting room, light refreshment stall and tea stall . Bidar has connectivity with Bengaluru, Pune, Hyderabad, Sainagar Shirdi, Latur, Aurangabad, Nanded, Kalburgi, Osmanabad, and Mumbai (according to Railway Budget 2014–15)

| Preceding station | Indian Railways | Following station |
|---|---|---|
| Chitta towards ? | South Central Railway zone Vikrabad–Bidar branch line | Terminus |
