= Kurduvadi Junction railway station =

Biggest Railway Junction station in Maharashtra, India

Kurduvadi Junction
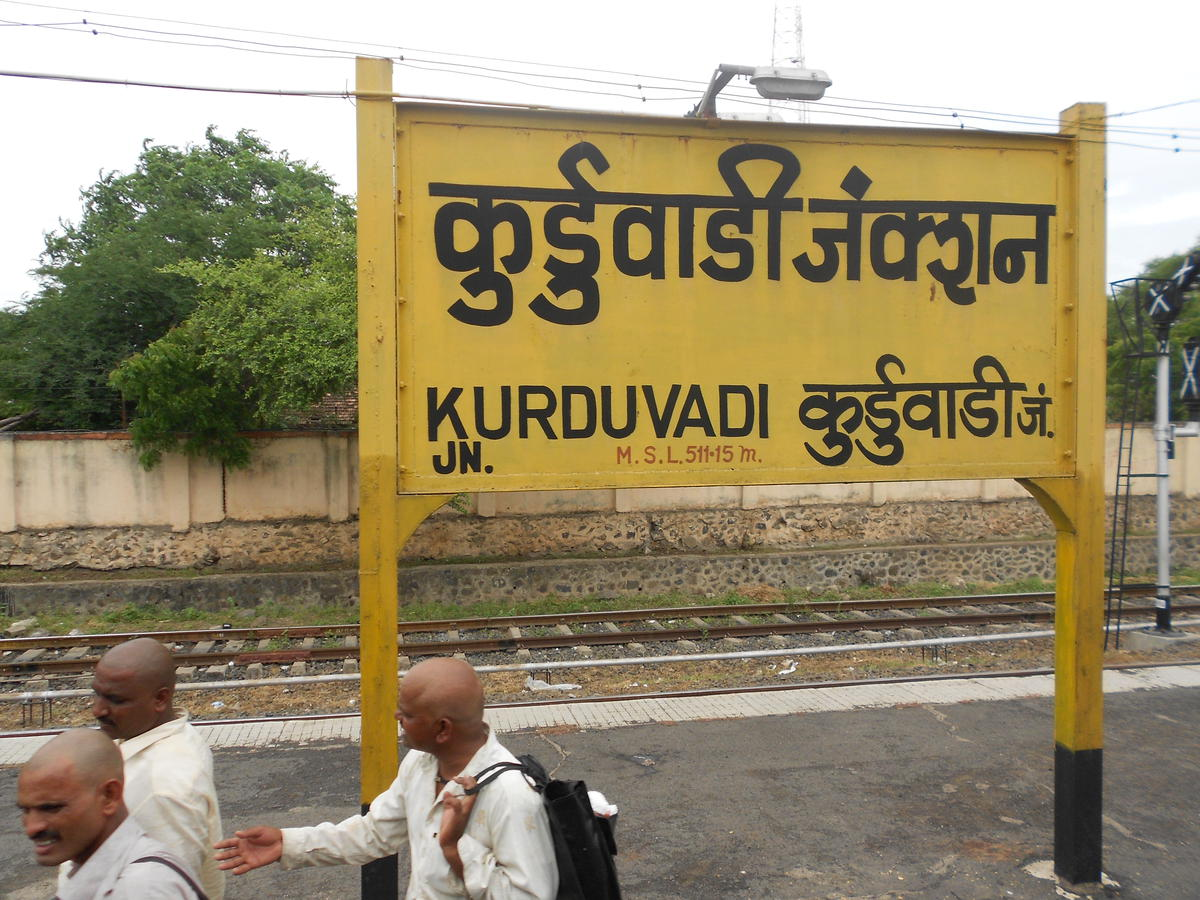

General information
- Location: State Highway 149, Kurduvadi, Maharashtra; India
- Coordinates: 18°05′31″N 75°25′01″E
- Elevation: 516 metres (1,693 ft)
- System: Indian Railways junction station
- Owner: Indian Railways
- Operator: Central Railway
- Lines: Mumbai–Chennai line Miraj–Latur Road
- Platforms: 5 passengers + 1 for Goods
- Tracks: 4 - towards Pune, Solapur, Latur, Miraj
- Connections: Categorised as A1 station, NSG 3 in all India station ranking

Construction
- Structure type: Standard on ground
- Parking: Yes
- Cycle facilities: No

Other information
- Status: Functioning
- Station code: KWV
- Division(s): Solapur

History
- Opened: 1859
- Rebuilt: 2000

Passengers
- 2025: 4358 daily, crosses 10,000 on peak days on Sundays, Holidays, Ashadhi Ekadashi etc
Location
- Location within India Location within Maharashtra

Kurduvadi Junction is one of the biggest railway junction stations located in Solapur district in the Indian state of Maharashtra and serves Kurduvadi. It is a junction station at the intersection point of Mumbai–Chennai line and Latur road–Miraj line. Kurduvadi Workshop is located next to the station. In 2022 Kurduwadi Junction station included in the Amrit Bharat scheme. With this New Station building is under construction.

== History ==
This station was earlier known as Barshi Road Railway Station.

Starting with the first train in India from Chhatrapati Shivaji Terminus in Mumbai to Thane on 16 April 1853 on a track laid by the Great Indian Peninsula Railway, Pune was linked with Mumbai with the completion of the railway track across the Bhor Ghat incline between Palasdhari to Khandala in 1862. GIPR extended its line to Raichur in 1871 and met the line of Madras Railway thereby establishing direct Mumbai–Chennai link.

The Pune–Raichur sector of the Mumbai–Chennai line was opened in stages: the portion from Diksal in Pune to Barshi Road was opened in 1859, from Barshi Road to Mohol in 1860 and from Mohol to Sholapur also in 1860. Work on the line from Sholapur southwards was begun in 1865.

Barsi Light Railway was a 202-mile (325 km)-long, 2 ft 6 in (762 mm)-wide railway from Kurduvadi to Latur. It was opened in 1897 on a 22-mile (35 km) long railway track from Barsi Road to Barsi, and extended in stages. The narrow-gauge line from Barsi Road to Pandharpur was extended to Miraj in 1927.

Gauge conversion from 2 ft 6 in (762 mm) to 5 ft 6 in (1,676 mm) of the Miraj–Latur track and extension of the new line to Latur Road was taken up in 1992 and completed in stages. The last phase of the 375-kilometre (233 mi) long project was completed in 2008.

== Amenities ==
Kurduvadi railway station has a public call office booth with facilities for subscriber trunk dialling, refreshment stalls serving vegetarian and non-vegetarian food, retiring room, waiting room, and book stall.

== Workshop ==
Kurduvadi Workshop was set up for repair of narrow-gauge steam locomotives, coaches and wagons by Barsi Light Railway in 1930. With the reduction in narrow-gauge rolling stock, the Workshop has taken up new activities as per requirements. Kurduvadi Workshop now undertakes rehabilitation of 20 broad-gauge wagons per month.

Kurduvadi had a narrow-gauge diesel-loco shed for Barsi Light Railway. The shed was closed down after conversion of the narrow-gauge railway.

== Electrification ==
The Pune–Solapur–Wadi line is being electrified with a loan of Rs. 1,500 crore from Asian Development Bank. Work was initiated in 2012.

== Track doubling ==
The railway track in the Daund–Wadi sector is being doubled at a cost of Rs. 700 crore. The railway track in the Kurduwadi–Latur Road sector will be doubled at a cost of Rs. 700 crore.

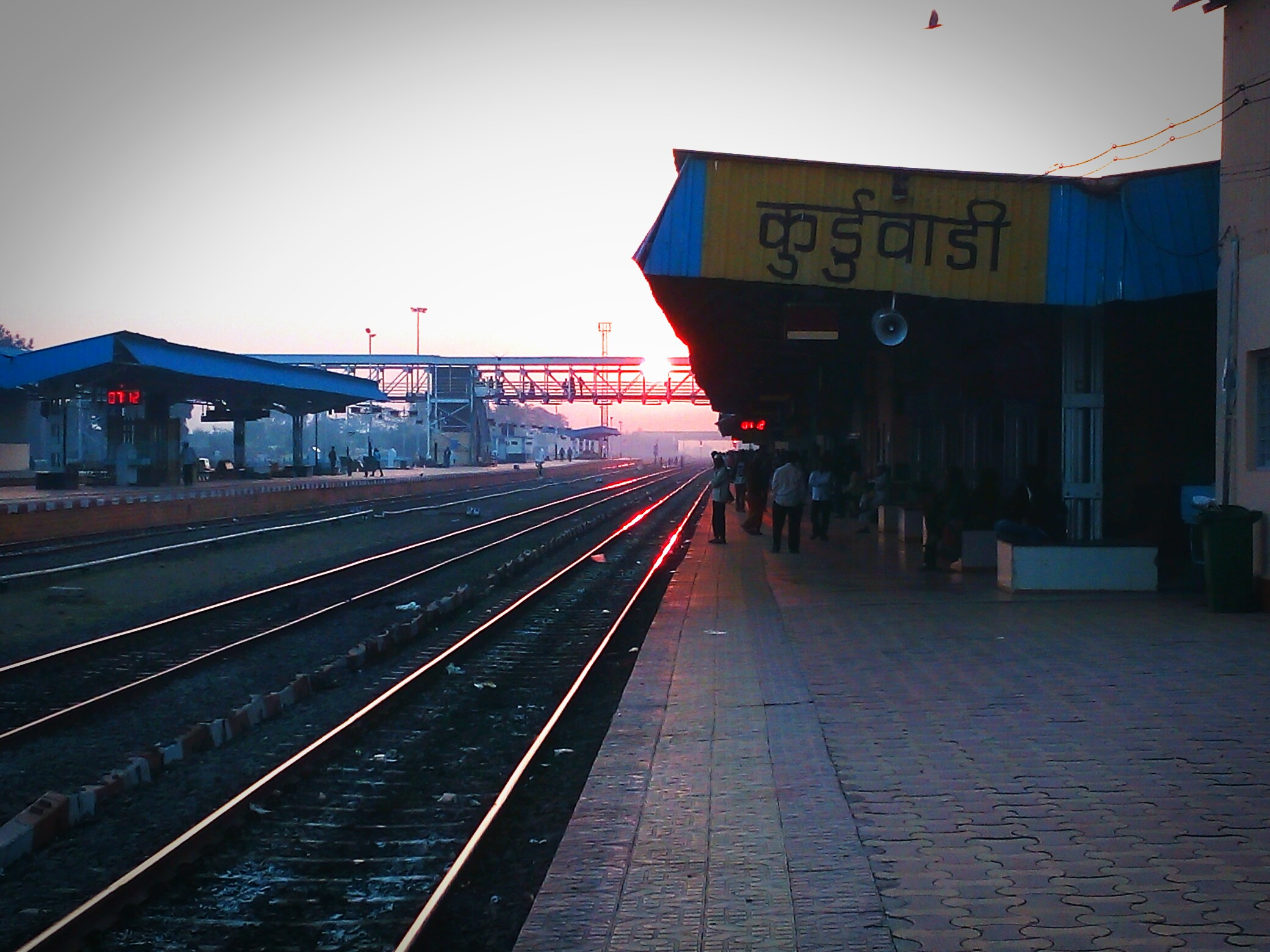
Kurduwadi railway station morning

Preceding station	Indian Railways	Following station
Dhavalas towards ?	Central Railway zone Mumbai–Chennai line	Wadsinghe towards ?
Mahisgaon towards ?	Central Railway zone Latur–Miraj line	Laul towards ?
