= Tirupati–Akola Express =

Train in India

Overview
- Service type: Express
- Status: Active
- Locale: Andhra Pradesh, Telangana and Maharashtra
- First service: 8 May 2026; 5 months ago
- Current operator: South Coast Railway (SCoR)

Route
- Termini: Tirupati (TPTY); Akola Junction (AK)
- Stops: 25
- Distance travelled: 1,221 km (759 mi)
- Average journey time: 25h 35m
- Service frequency: Weekly
- Train number: 17429 / 17430

On-board services
- Classes: General Unreserved, Sleeper Class, AC 3rd Class, AC 2nd Class
- Seating arrangements: Yes
- Sleeping arrangements: Yes
- Catering facilities: Pantry Car
- Observation facilities: Large windows
- Baggage facilities: No
- Other facilities: Below the seats

Technical
- Rolling stock: LHB coach
- Track gauge: 1,676 mm (5 ft 6 in)
- Electrification: 25 kV 50 Hz AC Overhead line
- Operating speed: 130 km/h (81 mph) maximum,17429 - 48 km/h (30 mph),17430 - 55 km/h (34 mph) average average including halts.
- Track owner: Indian Railways
Route map
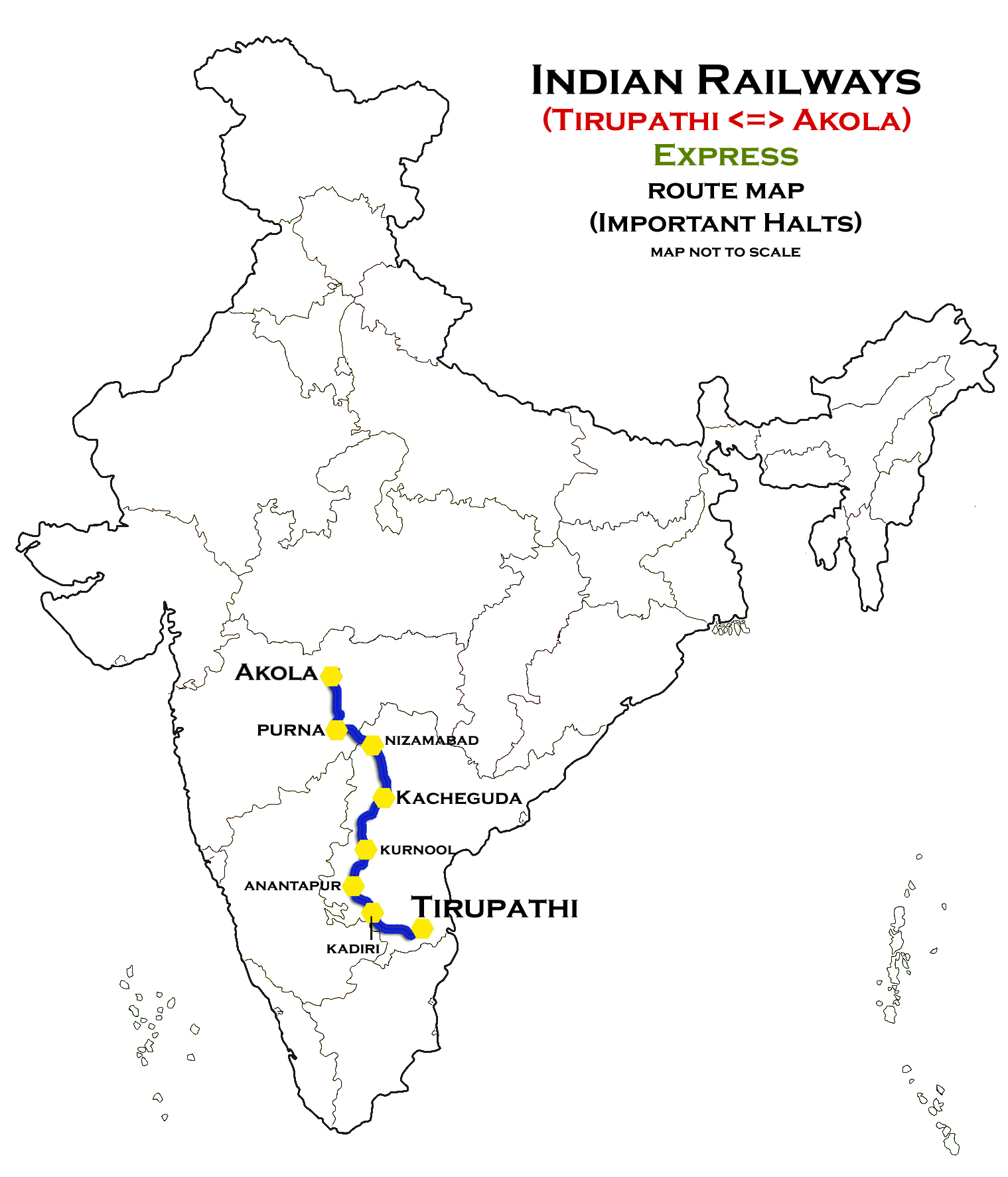

The 17429 / 17430 Tirupati–Akola Express is an express train belonging to South Coast Railway zone that runs between the city Tirupati of Andhra Pradesh and Akola Junction of Maharashtra in India.

It operates as train number 17429 from Tirupati to Akola Junction and as train number 17430 in the reverse direction, serving the states of Maharashtra, Telangana and Andhra Pradesh.

== Services ==
• 17429/ Tirupati–Akola Express has an average speed of 48 km/h and covers 1221 km in 25h 35m.

• 17430/ Akola–Tirupati Express has an average speed of 55 km/h and covers 1221 km in 22h 15m.

== Route and halts ==
The important halts of the train are :

- Tiruputi
- Pakala Junction
- Pileru
- Madanapalle
- Mulakalacheruvu
- Kadiri
- Dharmavaram Junction
- Anantapur
- Dhone Junction
- Kurnool City
- Gadwal
- Wanaparthy
- Mahbubnagar
- Kacheguda
- Medchal
- Kamareddy
- Nizamabad Junction
- Basar
- Dharmabad
- Hazur Sahib Nanded
- Purna Junction
- Basmath
- Hingoli Deccan
- Washim
- Akola Junction

== Schedule ==
• 17429 – 12:25 pm (Friday) [Tirupati]

• 17430 – 8:10 am (Sunday) [Akola Junction]

== Coach composition ==
This train runs with standard LHB COACHES from Tirupati on 29th May 2026 and from Akola on 31st May 2026

1. General Unreserved – 4
2. Sleeper Class – 8
3. AC 3rd Class – 4
4. AC 2nd Class – 1
5. Pantry car - 1
6. SLR - 1
7. EOG - 1

== Traction ==
As the entire route is fully electrified, it is hauled by a Lallaguda Shed-based WAP-7 electric locomotive from Tirupati to Akola Junction and vice versa.

== Rake reversal or rake share ==
The train will reverse 1 time :

1. Purna Junction

The train will Rake Sharing with Tirupati–Sainagar Shirdi Express (17417/17418).

== See also ==
Trains from Tirupati :

1. Visakhapatnam–Tirupati Express
2. Seven Hills Express
3. Tirupati–Jammu Tawi Humsafar Express
4. Tirupati–Narsapur Express
5. Tirupati–Charlapalli Express (via Proddatur)

No trains from Akola Junction

== Notes ==
a. Runs one day in a week with both directions.
