= Kacheguda–Narkhed Intercity Express =

Express train belonging to Indian Railways

Kacheguda–Narkher Intercity Express
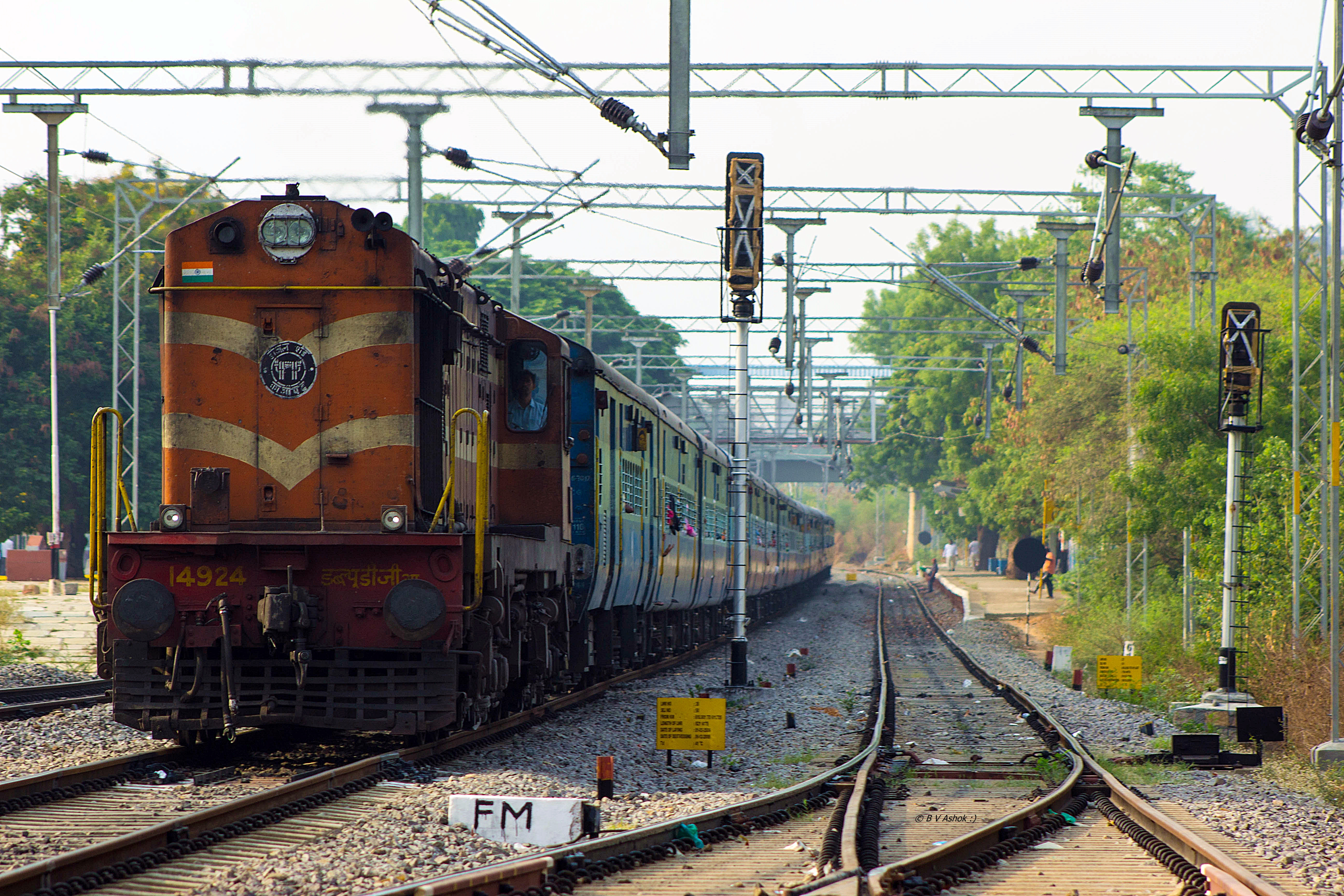
- Kacheguda–Narkher Intercity Express

Overview
- Service type: Express
- First service: 1 January 2016; 10 years ago
- Current operator: South Central Railway zone

Route
- Termini: Kacheguda; Narkhed
- Stops: 31
- Distance travelled: 732 km (455 mi)
- Average journey time: 16 hours 12 mins
- Service frequency: Daily (except Monday)
- Train number: 17641 / 17642

On-board services
- Classes: general unreserved, AC chair car, Chair car
- Seating arrangements: Yes
- Sleeping arrangements: No
- Catering facilities: No
- Observation facilities: Rake Sharing with 17639 / 17640 Kacheguda–Akola Intercity Express

Technical
- Rolling stock: Standard Indian Railways Coaches
- Track gauge: 1,676 mm (5 ft 6 in)
- Operating speed: 46 km/h (29 mph)
Route map
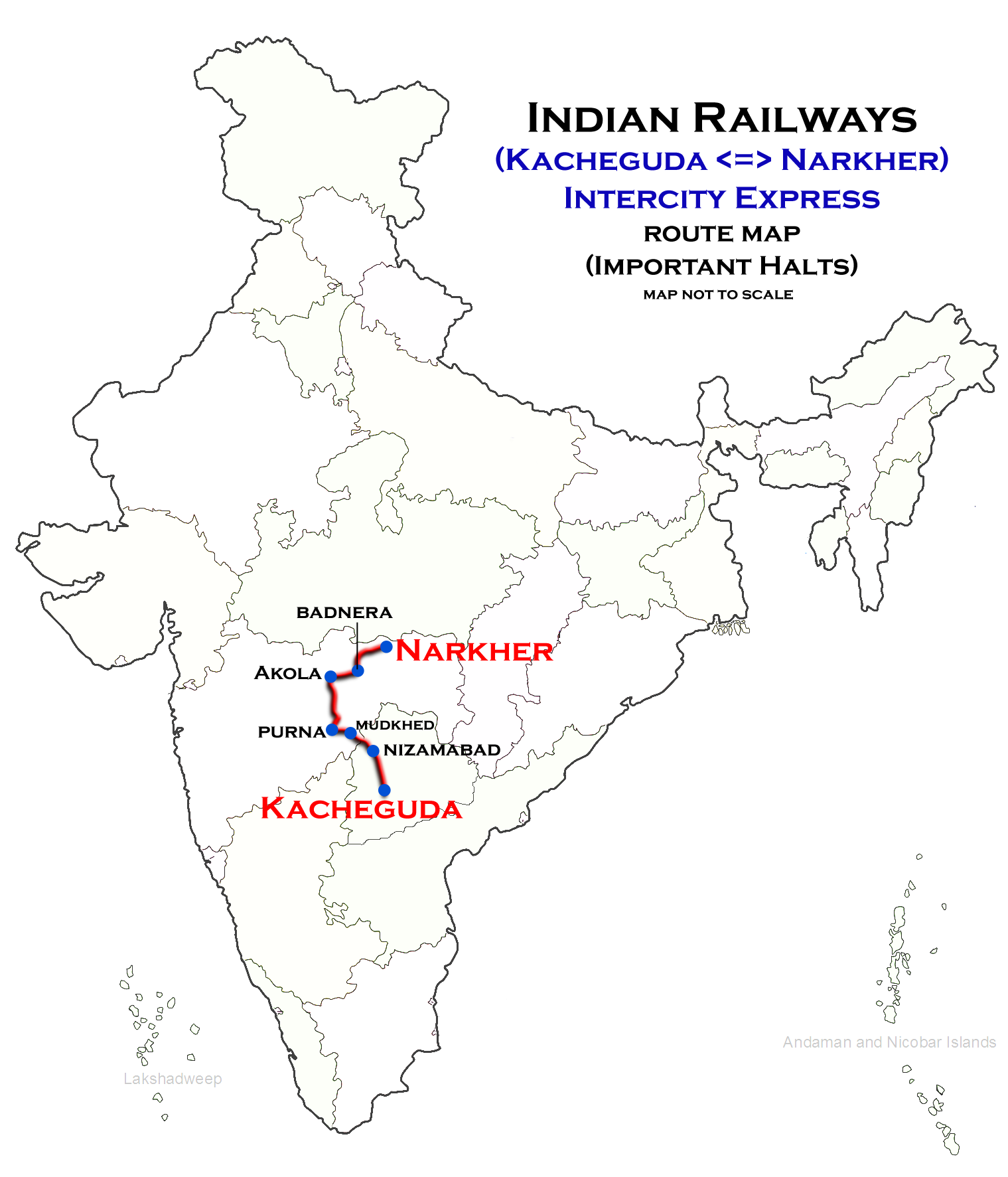

The 17641 / 42 Kacheguda–Narkhed Intercity Express is an Express train belonging to Indian Railways South Central Railway zone that runs between Kacheguda and Narkhed in India.

It operates as train number 17641 from Kacheguda to Narkhed and as train number 17642 in the reverse direction serving the states of Telangana & Maharashtra.

== Coaches ==
The 17641 / 42 Kacheguda–Narkhed Intercity Express has one AC Chair Car, four Non AC chair car, 12 general unreserved and two SLR (seating with luggage rake) coaches. It does not carry a pantry car coach.

As is customary with most train services in India, coach composition may be amended at the discretion of Indian Railways depending on demand.

== Service ==
The 17641 Kacheguda–Narkhed Intercity Express covers the distance of 732 km (455 mi) in 16 hours 00 mins (46 km/h) and in 15 hours 45 mins as the 17642 Narkhed–Kacheguda Intercity Express (60 km/h).

As the average speed of the train is less than 55 km/h (34 mph), as per railway rules, its fare does not includes a Superfast surcharge.

== Routing ==
The 17641 / 42 Kacheguda–Narkhed Intercity Express runs from Kacheguda via Nizamabad Junction, Mudkhed Junction, Hazur Sahib Nanded, Purna Junction, Hingoli Deccan, Washim, Akola Junction to Badnera Jn to Narkher Junction via Navi Amravati–Warud Orange City.

== Traction ==
As the route is electrified, a Lallaguda based WAP-7 pulls the train to its destination.
