= Dr. Ambedkar Nagar (Mhow)–Yesvantpur Weekly Express =

Train in India

Overview
- Service type: Express
- First service: 4 August 2013; 12 years ago
- Current operator: Western Railways

Route
- Termini: Dr. Ambedkar Nagar (Mhow); Yesvantpur Junction
- Stops: 32
- Distance travelled: 1932 km
- Average journey time: 38 hours 55 minutes
- Service frequency: Weekly
- Train number: 19301/19302

On-board services
- Classes: AC II Tier, AC III Tier, Sleeper class, General Unreserved
- Seating arrangements: Available
- Auto-rack arrangements: Available
- Catering facilities: Available
- Observation facilities: LHB coach
- Baggage facilities: Available

Technical
- Track gauge: 1,676 mm (5 ft 6 in)
Route map
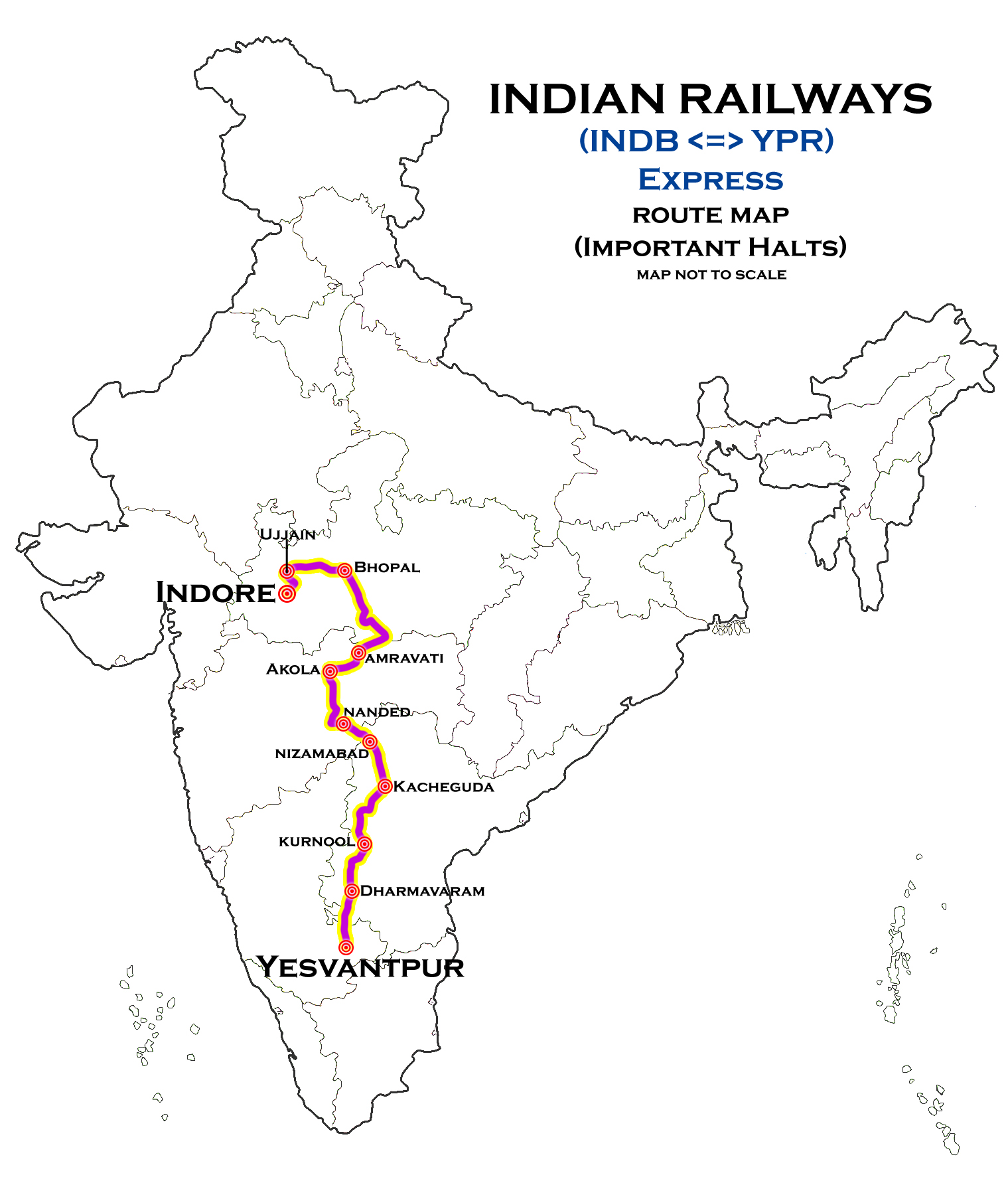

The 19301/19302 Dr. Ambedkar Nagar (Mhow)–Yesvantpur Weekly Express is an Express train belonging to Western Railway zone. It runs between Dr. Ambedkar Nagar (Mhow) station of Indore, the largest city and commercial hub in the central Indian state of Madhya Pradesh and Yesvantpur Junction in Bengaluru, the capital of Karnataka state.

== Coach composition ==
The train consists of 20 coaches :

- 2 AC II Tier
- 4 AC III Tier
- 7 Sleeper class
- 1 Pantry car
- 4 General Unreserved
- 2 End-on Generator

== Route and halts ==
The important halts of the train are :

- Dr. Ambedkar Nagar
- Indore Junction
- Dewas Junction
- Ujjain Junction
- Maksi Junction
- Berchha
- Shujalpur
- Bhopal Junction
- Rani kamalapati
- Itarsi Junction
- Betul
- Amla Junction
- Narkhed Junction
- Warud Orange City
- Chandurbazar
- New Amravati
- Akola Junction
- Washim
- Hingoli Deccan
- Purna Junction
- Hazur Sahib Nanded
- Mudkhed Junction
- Nizamabad Junction
- Kamareddy
- Kacheguda
- Mahbubnagar
- Gadwal junction
- Kurnool City
- Gooty Junction
- Dharmavaram Junction
- Yelahanka Junction
- Yesvantpur Junction

== Reversals ==
The train is reversed 3 times at:

- Ujjain Junction
- Akola Junction
- Purna Junction

== Schedule ==
Train number	Station code	Departure station	Departure time	Departure day	Arrival station	Arrival time	Arrival day
19301	DADN	Dr. Ambedkar Nagar (Mhow)	20:00 PM	Sunday	Yesvantpur	10:50 AM	Tuesday
19302	YPR	Yesvantpur	15:45 PM	Tuesday	Dr. Ambedkar Nagar (Mhow)	7:05 AM	Thursday

== Service ==
19301/ Dr. Ambedkar Nagar–Yesvantpur Weekly Express has an average speed of 50 km/h and covers 1932 km in 38 hrs 55 mins.

19302/ Yesvantpur–Dr. Ambedkar Nagar Weekly Express has an average speed of 45 km/h and covers 1932 km in 43 hrs 10 mins.

== Traction ==
earlier they were run by diesel locomotives WDM-2 , WDG-3A , WDM-3A , WDM-3D and WDG-4. Now Both trains are hauled by a Vadodara Locomotive Shed-based WAP-7 electric locomotive between Dr. Ambedkar Nagar and Yesvantpur Junction, and vice versa.

== See also ==
- Indore Junction
- Yesvantpur Junction
- Kochuveli–Indore Weekly Express
