= Purna-Akola line =

Railway line in Maharashtra, India

Overview
- Status: Operational
- Owner: Indian Railways
- Locale: Maharashtra
- Termini: Purna Junction; Akola Junction
- Stations: 24 Approx

Service
- Type: Branch line
- System: Electric loco system
- Operator(s): South Central Railway

Technical
- Track length: 207 km (129 mi)
- Number of tracks: 1 (single)
- Track gauge: 5 ft 6 in (1,676 mm) broad gauge
- Electrification: Yes

Purna-Akola line is a railway line connecting Purna Junction and Akola Junction in Maharashtra. It is administered by South Central Railway. Passenger service was inaugurated in 2008, and the converted line was opened in May 2012.

The railway line connects Marathwada and Vidarbha region of Maharashtra. Purna, Parbhani district and Akola belong to Marathwada and Vidarbha region respectively. Basmath, Hingoli and Washim is the major railway station on this section.

Purna-Akola line is also well connected between Secunderabad-Manmad line at Purna and Nagpur-Bhusawal section of Howrah-Nagpur-Mumbai line at Akola.

== Trains ==
Some Express and Passenger train passing through the line:

- Hazur Sahib Nanded-Jammu Tawi Humsafar Express
- Nagpur-CSMT Kolhapur Express
- Kacheguda–Akola Intercity Express
- Hazur Sahib Nanded-Shri Ganganagar Express
- Tirupati-Amravati Express
- Hazur Sahib Nanded-Amritsar Superfast Express
- Dr. Ambedkar Nagar (Mhow)–Yesvantpur Weekly Express
- Kacheguda–Narkhed Intercity Express
- Akola-Parli Vaijnath Express
- Hyderabad-Jaipur Superfast Express
- Purna-Akola Express
- Pune-Amravati Express (via Latur)
- Jaipur-Kurnool city Express
- Amb Andaura-Hazur Sahib Nanded Superfast Express
- Akola-Purna Passenger
- Parli Vaijnath-Akola Passenger

== See also ==
- Akola-Ratlam line
