= Adilabad–Hazur Sahib Nanded Express =

Train in India

Adilabad - Hazur Sahib Nanded Express
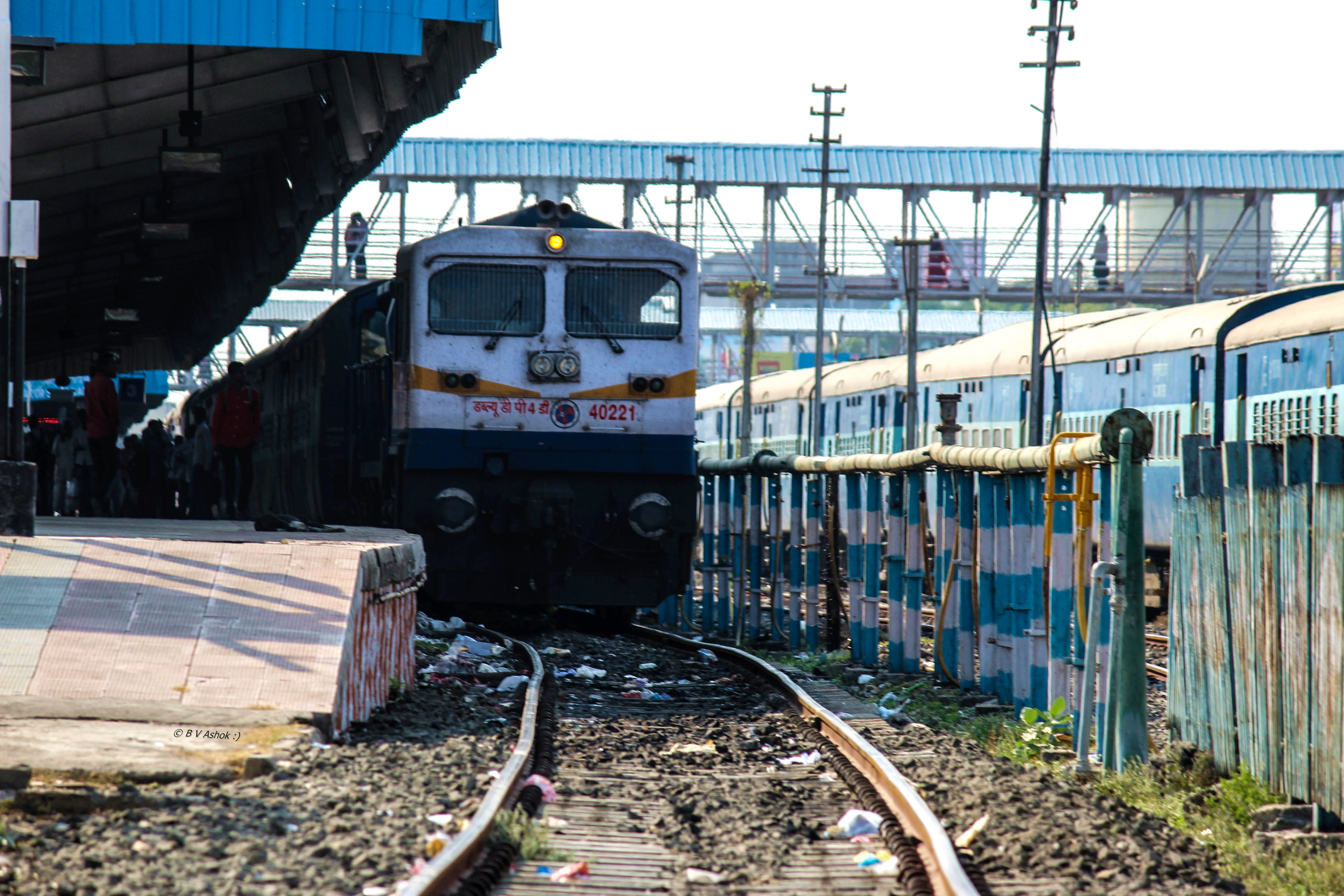
- Hazur Sahib Nanded - Adilabad Express at Nanded railway station

Overview
- Service type: Express
- First service: 14 July 2012
- Current operator: South Central Railway zone

Route
- Termini: Adilabad (ADB); Hazur Sahib Nanded (NED)
- Stops: 7
- Distance travelled: 184 km (114 mi)
- Average journey time: 3 hours 52 minutes
- Service frequency: Daily
- Train number: 17409/17410

On-board services
- Classes: Second Class sitting, AC 3 Tier, Sleeper 3 Tier, Unreserved
- Seating arrangements: Yes
- Sleeping arrangements: Yes
- Catering facilities: No
- Entertainment facilities: No

Technical
- Rolling stock: 2
- Track gauge: 1,676 mm (5 ft 6 in)
- Operating speed: 47 km/h (29 mph)

Adilabad - Hazur Sahib Nanded Express is an intercity train of the Indian Railways connecting Adilabad in Telangana and Nanded of Maharashtra. It is currently being operated with 17409/17410 train numbers on a daily basis. It was flagged off on 14 July 2012.

== Service ==
The 17409 Adilabad - Hazur Sahib Nanded Express has an average speed of 47 km/h and covers 184 km in 3 hours 55 minutes. The 17410 Hazur Sahib Nanded - Adilabad Express has an average speed of 48 km/h and covers 184 km in 3 hours 50 minutes.

== Route and halts ==
- Adilabad
- Kinwat
- Bodhadi Bujrug
- Sahasrakund
- Himayatnagar
- Hadgaon Road
- Bhokar
- Mudkhed Junction
- Hazur Sahib Nanded

== Timings ==
The 17409 Adilabad-Hazur Sahib Nanded Express departs from Adilabad at 8:00 a.m. and arrives at Hazur Sahib Nanded at 11:55 a.m.. The 17410 Hazur Sahib Nanded-Adilabad Express departs from Hazur Sahib Nanded at 3:50 p.m. and arrives at Adilabad at 6:55 p.m..

== Coach composite ==
The train consists of 13 coaches :

- 1 AC III Tier
- 4 Sleeper Coaches
- 3 Second Class sitting
- 4 General
- 2 Second-class Luggage/parcel van

== Traction ==
As the route is fully electrified, the train is hauled by a Vijayawada-based WAP-4.

== Rake sharing ==
This train shares its rake with 17405/17406 Krishna Express
