= Surendra Nath Jena =

Indian dancer (1924–2007)

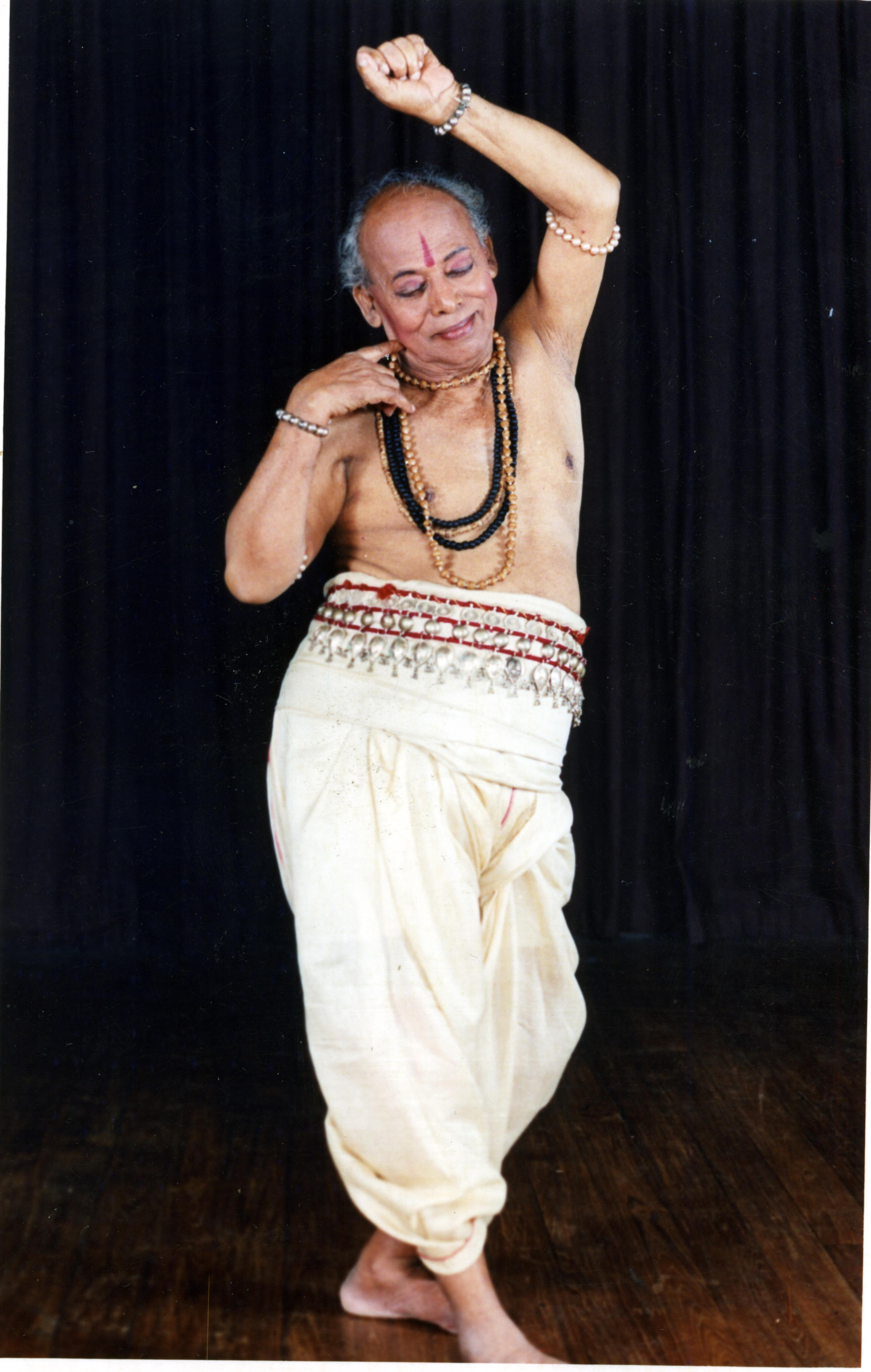
- Odissi Dancer, musician, poet
- Born: 10 October 1924; Uchapur, Bhadrak, Odisha, India
- Died: 8 October 2007 (aged 82); Shakarpur, New Delhi, India
- Occupations: Indian classical dancer, choreographer, actor, musician, poet, teacher
- Years active: 1931–2006
- Spouse: Kumudini Jena
- Children: Pratibha Jena Singh, Nirmal Ch Jena, Rekha Yadav, Rama Jena Pradhan
- Awards: Sangeet Natak Academi Award

Surendra Nath Jena (10 October 1924 – 8 October 2007) was an Odissi dancer. His dance style was characterized by an integration of diverse elements of Indian culture, including temple sculpture, ancient dance forms, Sanskrit and vernacular literature, yoga, traditional painting, manuscripts, and philosophy. Jena was also a choreographer and created the music and dance arrangements in his compositions.

== Early life and marriage ==
Surendra Nath Jena was born in 1924 in the village of Uchapur in the Bhadrak district of Odisha. He was born to farmers, Kalandi Charan Jena and Gukhuni Devi Jena. Following his father's death, his mother supported the family by selling vegetables and fish in the local market. His mother came from a family of local singers and Jatra actors, and she enrolled him in Asura Matha, a nearby institution focused on teaching dance and drama, when he was seven years old. This decision was partly influenced by Jena's lack of interest in formal schooling and his playful nature.

Under the guidance of his Jatra teacher, Anand Nayak, Surendra Nath Jena began performing Jatra, narrating stories from epic tales such as the Mahabharata, Puranas, and Ramayana. Over nearly three decades, he traversed Odisha, often traveling by bullock carts or on foot alongside his Jatra troupe. Their performances, which lasted throughout the night, were characterized by rigorous rehearsals and minimal resources, including limited financial means and food supplies.

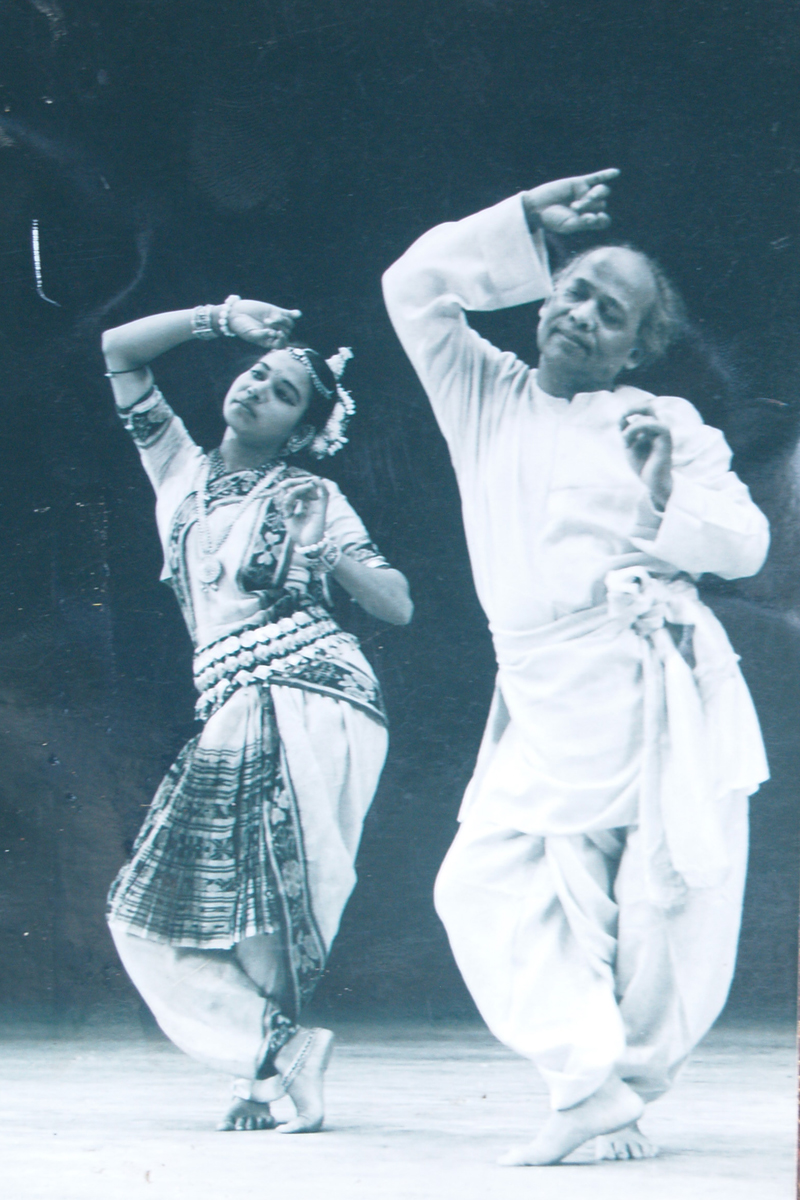
Surendra Nath Jena with his daughter Pratibha Jena Singh

Surendra Nath Jena received an opportunity when an actor from the Ras Party of Gopinathpur offered him a position in the repertory company. This job, which provided a salary of twenty rupees, was considered significant in rural India during that era. He assumed the role of a teacher and actor, becoming the guru of the Jaidurga Dramatic troupe in Chudwara and later serving as the Director of the Jatra troupe, Sharda Kala Kunja in Nagaspur.

In his late thirties, Surendra Nath Jena married Smt. Kumudini Jena. Nirmal Ch Jena established the Odissi Dance Company (ODC) in Sydney, Australia, where he organized a series of performances and dance education programs in cities such as Sydney, Melbourne, and Canberra. His daughter, Pratibha Jena Singh, became a teacher of traditional Odissi style at the Triveni Kala Sangam, New Delhi, as well as at dance schools in Russia and Ukraine. Additionally, his other daughters, Rekha Yadav in Delhi and Rama Jena Pradhan in Bhubaneswar, are involved in teaching music and dance.

== Career ==
Surendra Nath Jena spent six months in Kolkata to study Kathakali under Bal Krishna Menon. He found Kathakali, a Kerala dance form, to be highly refined compared to Jatra, motivating him to pursue learning it. However, financial constraints prevented him from completing his studies. In the 1950s, Odissi experienced a resurgence led by Oriya artists, scholars, Gotipua Gurus, and Maharis like Jayantika. Guru Surendra Nath Jena dedicated the initial five years to studying this revived style, which was reconstructed based on the accounts of former Devadasis/Maharis and gotipuas (young boys impersonating female dancers who replaced the Maharis). Upon completing his studies, he was conferred the Nrutya Bhushan degree in Odissi Dance in 1965–66.

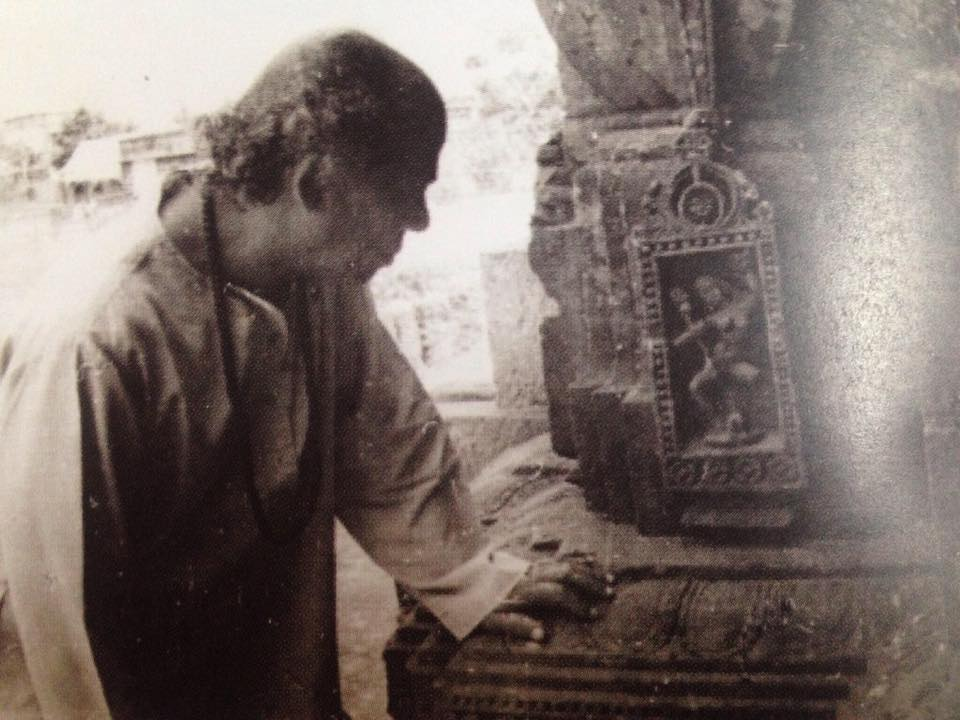
Inspiration from temple

After relocating from Odisha, Jena settled in Delhi, where he became an assistant at Nritya Niketan in 1966. Subsequently, he joined Triveni Kala Sangam, an esteemed art institution in New Delhi, as an independent Odissi dance teacher in 1967.

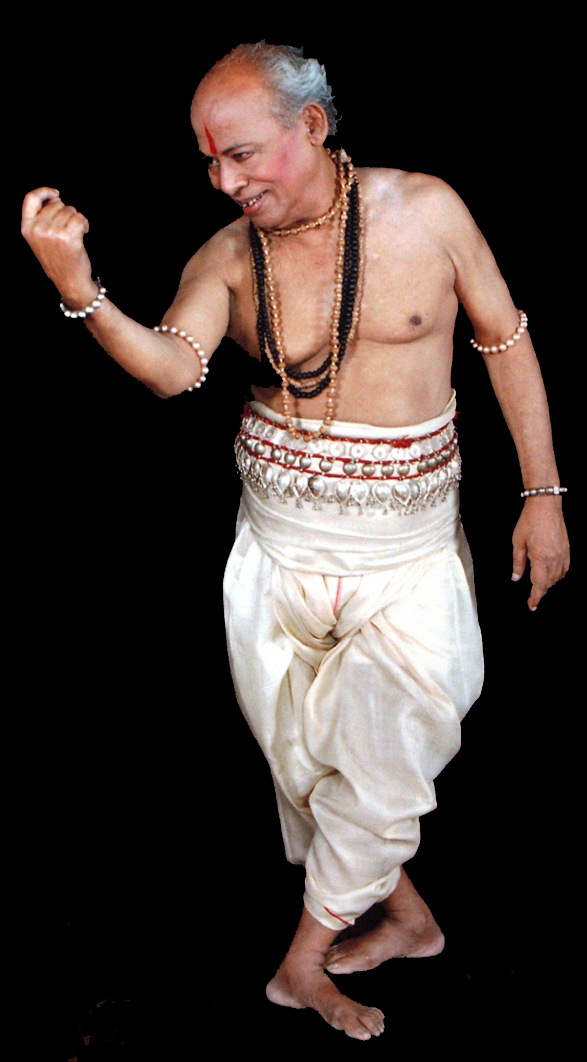
Unique style, Jena dancing

In 1966, upon relocating to Delhi, Surendra Nath Jena embarked on developing his distinctive style of Odissi dance. This unique approach was deeply influenced by his extensive study of ancient literature and Odisha temple sculpture. Jena's choreography aimed to animate the iconic poses depicted in temple carvings, infusing them with life and emotion. He emphasized the significance of both emotional expression (Bhav) and fundamental postures (Bhangi) in his dance compositions, viewing them as complementary elements. Jena upheld the traditional belief that devotion (Bhakti) finds manifestation through dance and music, considering them as forms of spiritual practice (Sadhana).

Surendra Nath Jena's style of Odissi dance is inspired by architecture and temple sculpture in Odisha, and it draws from parallels between the imagery found in Odisha's rural life and various traditional art forms such as Jatra, Pattachitra scrolls, Talapatra paintings, and ancient texts. Surendra Nath Jena's devotion centered on Radha and Krishna, whom he regarded as his Ishta Devata, or chosen deities. His style of dance was a means of expressing reverence and worship towards the divine through the art form of dance.

In the 1970s, Surendra Nath Jena traveled to the United States on three occasions to conduct Odissi workshops, both privately and at the Naropa Institute. Jena was awarded a fellowship by the Department of Culture, Government of India, for the period 1981–82. He authored the book Atman-Odissi Nritya Puran in Oriya poetry, focusing on the history, technique, and aesthetics of Odissi, which was published from 1991 to 1993. His dance compositions were documented on video by the Sangeet Natak Akademi in 1994. He retired in 2004.

The Roehampton University of London produced a documentary film titled "Performing Konark, Performing Hirapur" by Alessandra Lopez y Royo in 2005 and 2006, which showcased Jena's style. In 2007, Jena was honored with the Sangeet Natak Akademi Award by the President of India, Dr. Abdul Kalam, in recognition of his significant contributions to Odissi.

Jena died on 8 October 2007.

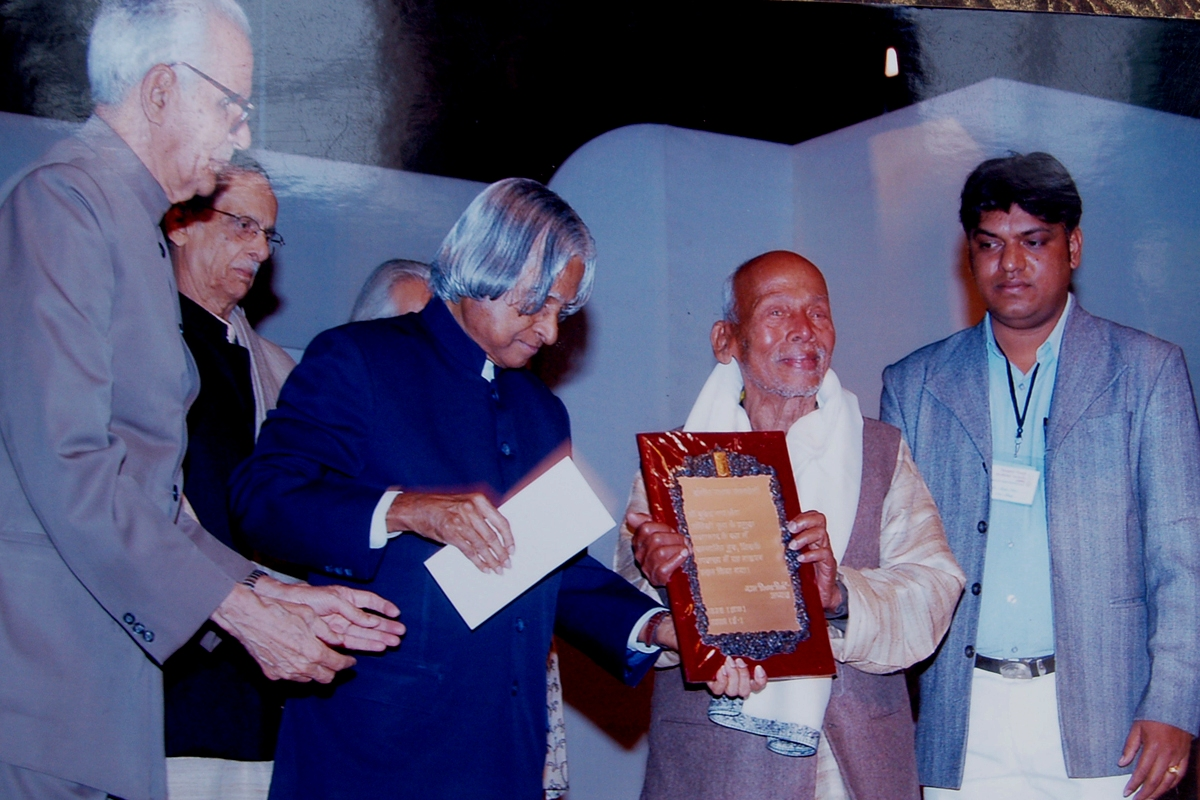
Surendra Nath Jena getting Sangeet Natak Academi Award from A.P.J. Abdul Kalam (President of India)
