= Kacheguda–Akola Intercity Express =

Railway train service

Akola–Kacheguda Intercity Express
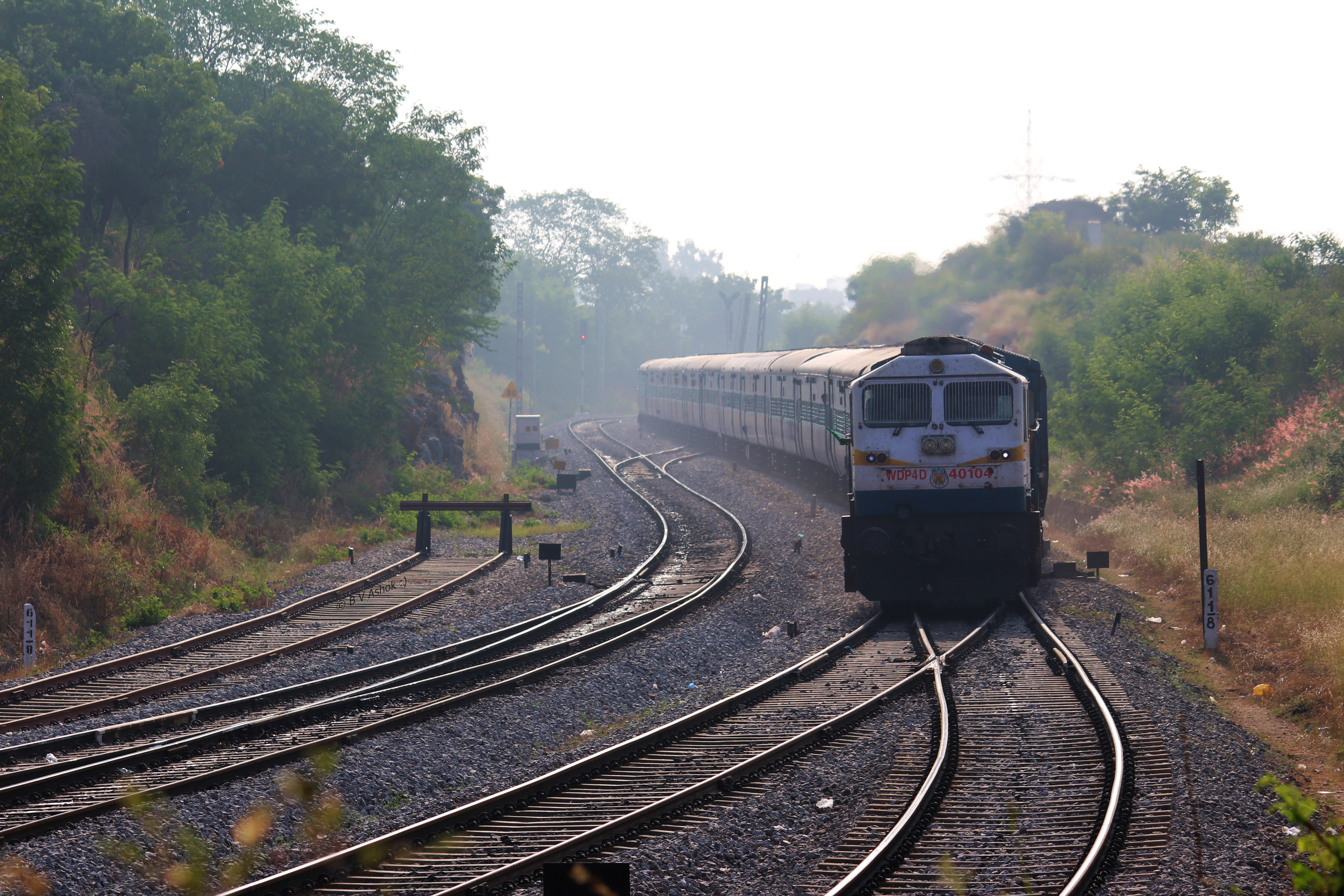
- Kacheguda–Akola Intercity Express

Overview
- Service type: Express
- Locale: Maharashtra, Telangana
- First service: 26 January 2011
- Current operator: South Central Railway

Route
- Termini: Akola Junction; Kacheguda (Hyderabad)
- Stops: 19
- Distance travelled: 515 km (320 mi)
- Average journey time: 10 hr. 45 min.
- Service frequency: Daily
- Train number: 17640DN/17639UP

On-board services
- Class: II 2S CC
- Seating arrangements: Yes
- Sleeping arrangements: Yes
- Auto-rack arrangements: Available
- Observation facilities: Rake Sharing with 17641 / 17642 Kacheguda–Narkhed Intercity Express
- Baggage facilities: Yes

Technical
- Track gauge: Broad gauge
- Operating speed: 48 km/h (30 mph) average with halts
Route map
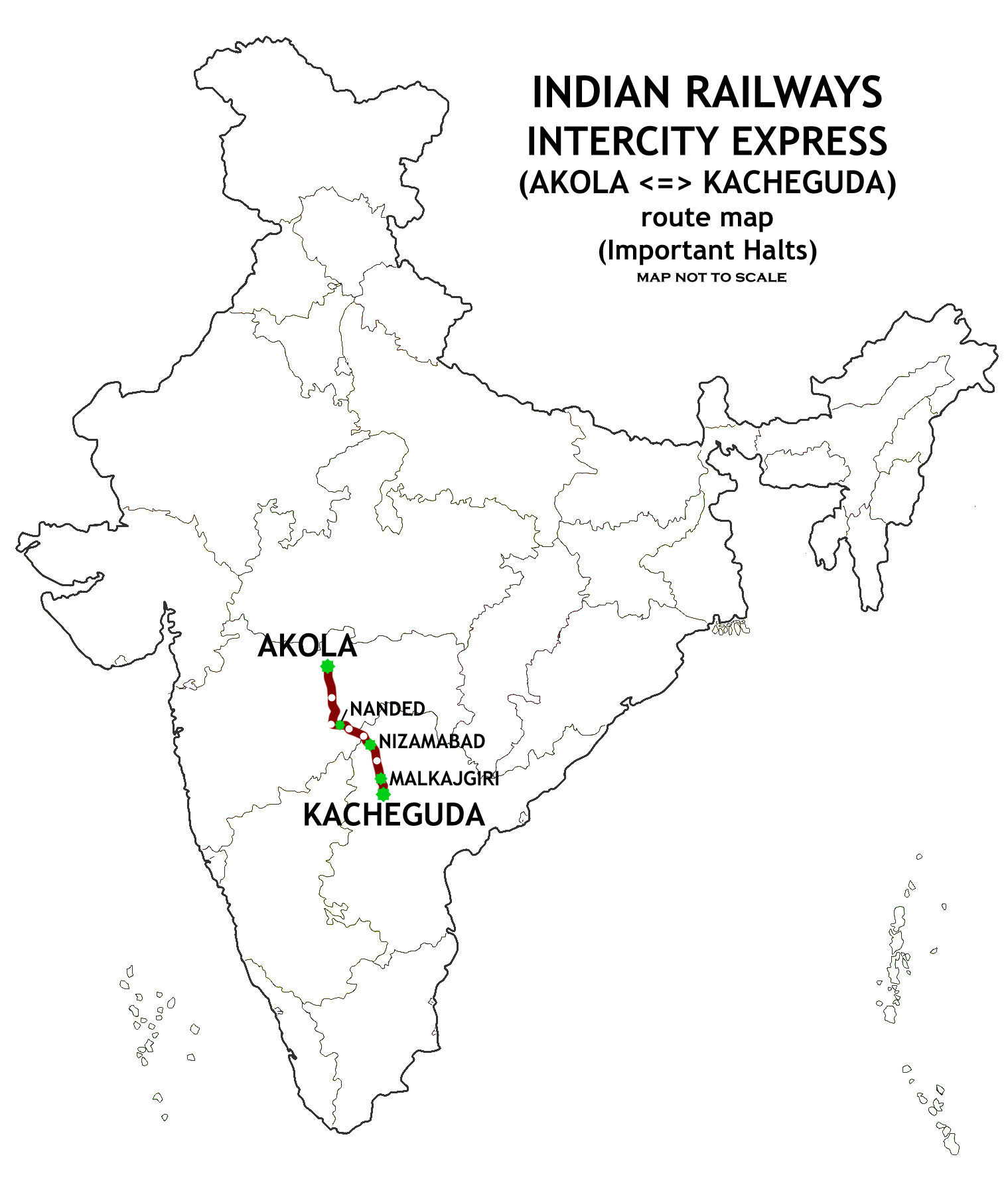

The Akola–Kacheguda Intercity Express is an Express train of South Central Railway zone, which runs between the cities of Akola, the major industrial & agricultural city of Maharashtra and Hyderabad, the capital city of Telangana, India. The train primarily runs on Secunderabad–Manmad section.

== Arrival and departure ==
- Train no.17640 departs from Akola Jn (AK), daily at 09:30 hrs. from platform no.5 reaching Kacheguda (KCG) at 20:15 hrs.
- Train no.17639 departs from Kacheguda, daily at 7:30, reaching Akola, at 18:00.

== Locomotive ==
The Akola–Kacheguda Intercity Express is hauled by WDM-2 or WDM-3A of GTL (Guntakal) shed.

=== Rake composition ===
The rake composition is LOCO-SLR-GEN-GEN-GEN-C1-D1-D2-GEN-GEN-GEN-GEN-GEN-GEN-GEN-GEN-SLR.

== Route and halts ==
1. AK Akola Junction
2. WHM Washim
3. HNL Hingoli Deccan
4. BMF Basmat
5. PAU Purna Junction
6. NED Hazur Sahib Nanded
7. MUE Mudkhed
8. UMRI Umri
9. DAB Dharmabad
10. BSX Basar
11. NZB Nizamabad
12. KMC Kamareddi
13. AKE Akanapet
14. MZL Mirzapali
15. WDR Wadiaram
16. MED Medchal
17. GWV Gowdavalli
18. BMO Bolarum
19. MJF Malkajgiri
20. STPD Sitafal Mandi
21. KCG Kacheguda Hyderabad

== See also ==
- Ajanta Express
- Nizamabad–Kacheguda DEMU
