= Sahasrakund railway station =

Railway station in Nanded, Maharashtra, India

Sahasrakund
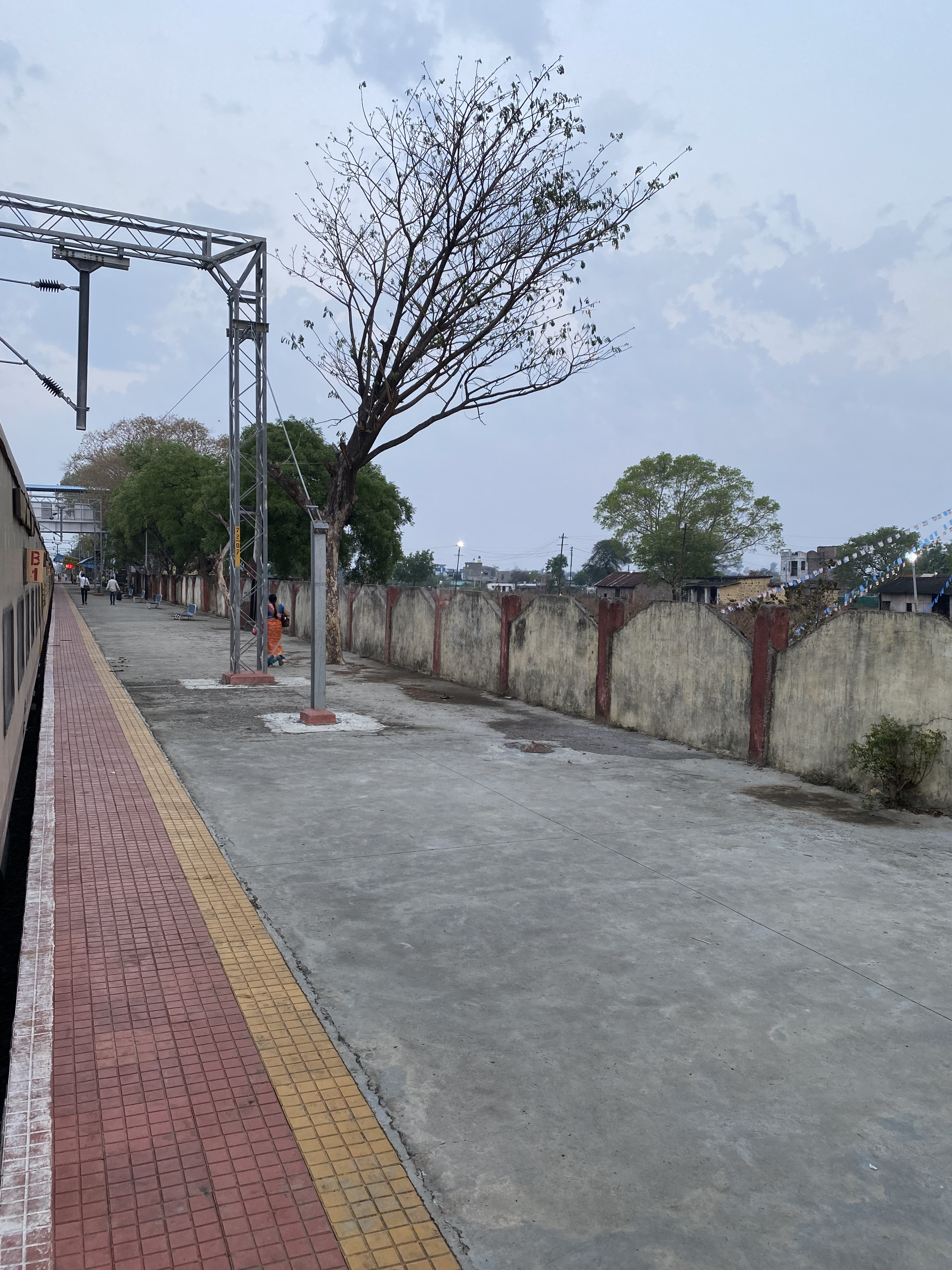
- Sahasrakund railway station

General information
- Location: Sahasrakund, Nanded; India
- Coordinates: 19.402903°N 78.008700°E
- Elevation: 401 metres (1,316 ft)
- System: Indian Railways station
- Owner: Indian Railways
- Operator: South Central Railways
- Line: Wardha–Nanded line
- Platforms: 2

Construction
- Structure type: At-grade
- Platform levels: 1

Other information
- Status: Operational
- Station code: SHSK
- Fare zone: South Central Railway zone

Services
Preceding station	Indian Railways	Following station
Mahimba towards ?	South Central Railway zone	Jirona towards ?
Location
- Location within Maharashtra Location within India
- Interactive map

Sahasrakund railway station (station code: SHSK) is a railway station serving Sahasrakund in Nanded district of Maharashtra, India. It is under the Nanded railway division of South Central Railway zone of Indian Railways. It is located on the Secunderabad–Adilabad line of Indian Railways. This station connects Sahasrakund with other major cities of Maharashtra and Telangana India like Nanded, Adilabad and Hyderabad.

The station is located at 401 metres above sea level and has two platforms.

== History ==
Gauge conversion to 5 ft 6 in (1,676 mm) broad gauge was completed between Manmad–Nanded/Mudhkhed in 1995. The patch between Mudkhed–Secunderabad remained metre-gauge till it was finally converted by 2003.

== Trains passing through Sahasrakund railway station ==
17405/17406 – Krishna Express

07775/07776 – Adilabad – Parli Vaijnath Special (UnReserved)/Purna – Adilabad DEMU Special

11401/11402 – Nandigram Express

17409/17410 – Adilabad – Hazur Sahib Nanded Intercity Express

07851/07852 – Adilabad – Purna DEMU/Parli Vaijnath – Adilabad DEMU Special

17609/17610 – Patna–Purna Express

== Gallery ==
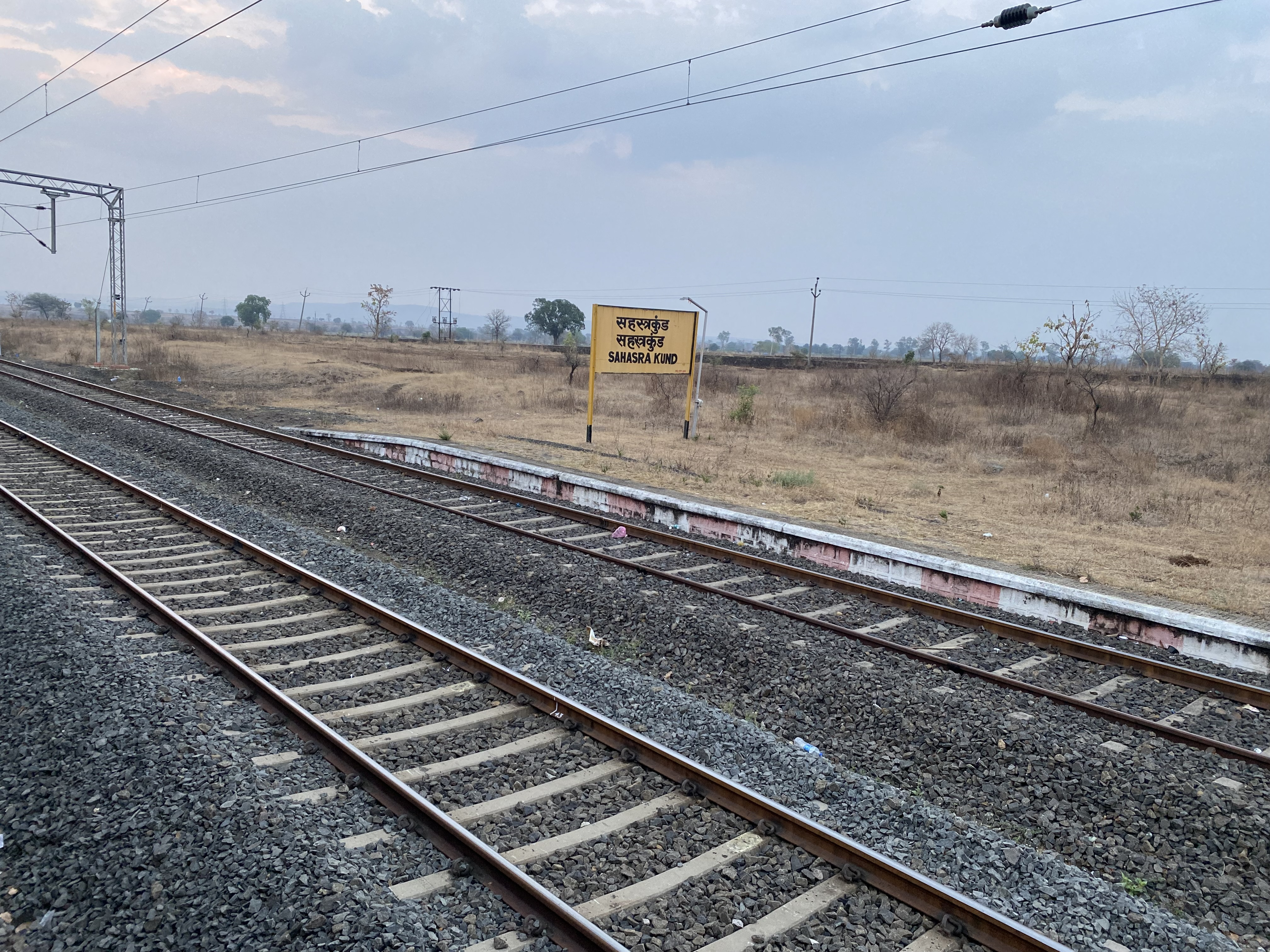

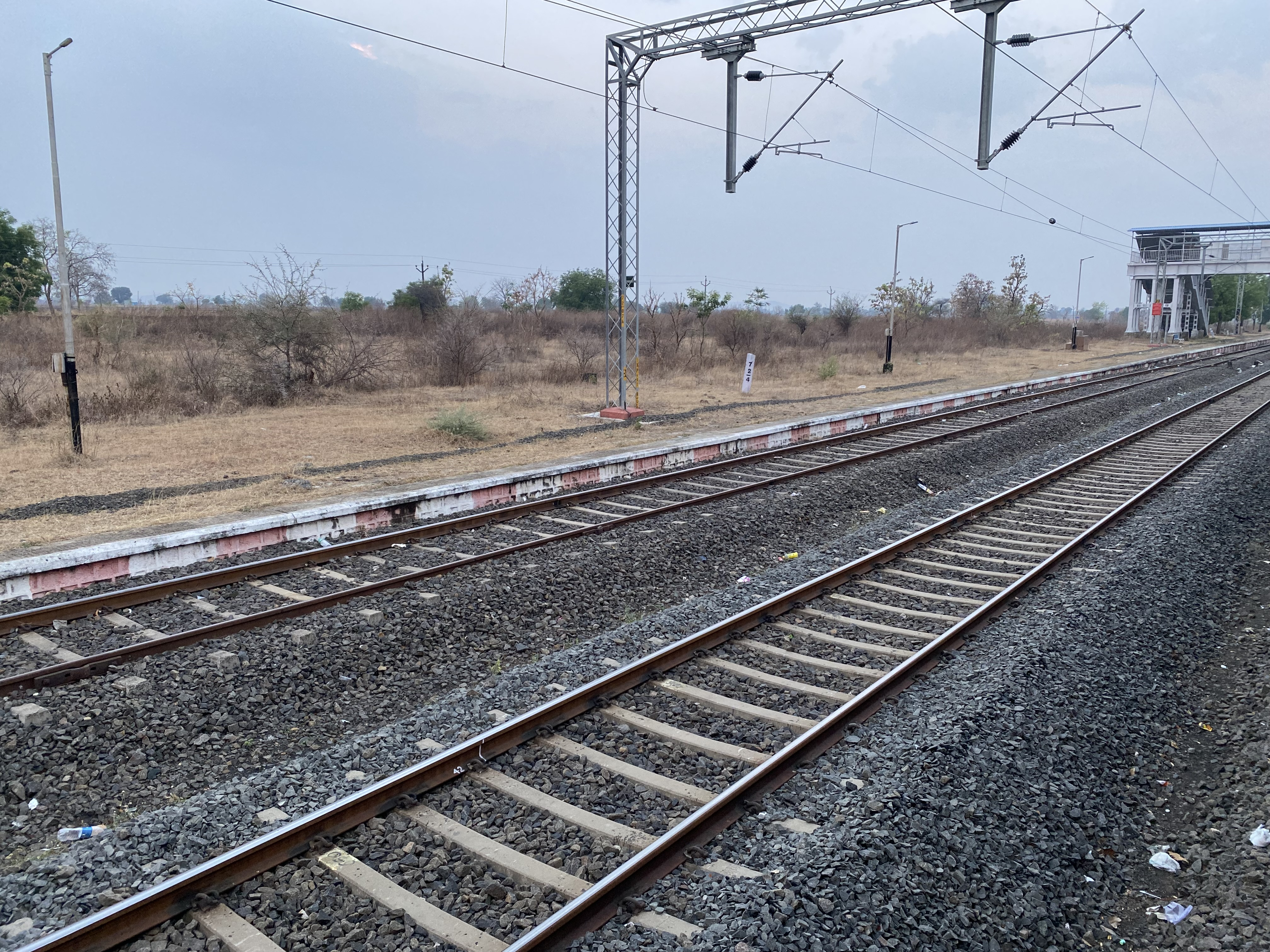
Sahasrakund railway station with railway tracks visible

== See also ==
- Hazur Sahib Nanded railway station
