= Patna–Purna Express =

Train in India

Overview
- Service type: Express
- First service: 18 March 2007; 17 years ago
- Current operator(s): South Central Railway

Route
- Termini: Patna Junction (PNBE); Purna Junction (PAU)
- Stops: 17
- Distance travelled: 1,734 km (1,077 mi)
- Average journey time: 32 hours 15 minutes
- Service frequency: Weekly (Note: Runs one day in a week for every direction.)
- Train number(s): 17609 / 17610

On-board services
- Class(es): AC 2 Tier, AC 3 Tier, Sleeper Class, General Unreserved
- Seating arrangements: No
- Sleeping arrangements: Yes
- Catering facilities: Available
- Observation facilities: Large windows
- Baggage facilities: No
- Other facilities: Below the seats

Technical
- Rolling stock: LHB coach
- Track gauge: 1,676 mm (5 ft 6 in)
- Operating speed: 54 km/h (34 mph) average including halts.
Route map
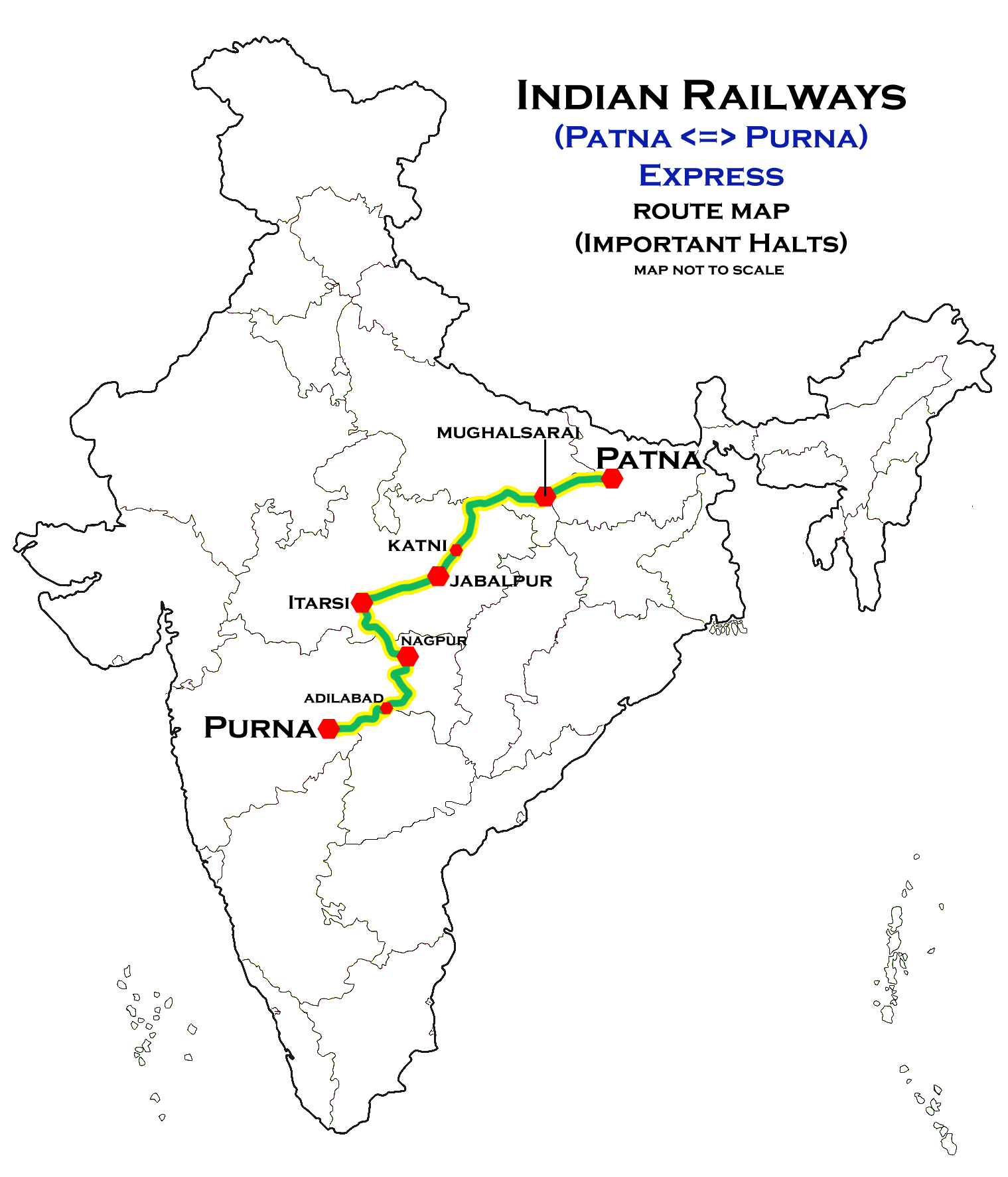

The 17609 / 17610 Patna–Purna Express is an express train belonging to South Central Railway zone that runs between Patna Junction and Purna Junction in India. It is currently being operated with 17609/17610 train numbers on a weekly basis.

== Service ==
The 17609/Patna–Purna Express has an average speed of 54 km/h and covers 1734 km in 32h 4m. The 17610/Purna–Patna Express has an average speed of 54 km/h and covers 1734 km in 32h 20m.

== Route and halts ==
The important halts of the train are:

- Patna Junction
- Ara Junction
- Buxar
- Mughalsarai Junction
- Satna Junction
- Katni Junction
- Jabalpur Junction
- Itarsi Junction
- Nagpur Junction
- Majri Junction
- Wani
- Adilabad
- Kinwat
- Sahasrakund
- Himayatnagar
- Hazur Sahib Nanded
- Purna Junction

== Coach composition ==
The train has standard ICF rakes with a maximum speed of 110 km/h. The train consists of 12 coaches:

- 1 AC II Tier
- 1 AC III Tier
- 5 Sleeper coaches
- 1 Pantry car
- 2 General Unreserved
- 2 Seating cum Luggage Rake

== Traction ==
Both trains are hauled by a Lallaguda Loco Shed based WAP-7 electric locomotive from Patna to Purna and vice versa.

== See also ==
- Patna Junction railway station
- Purna Junction railway station
