= Hazur Sahib Nanded–Una Himachal Express =

Train in India

Hazur Sahib Nanded-Una Himachal Express
Overview
- Service type: Superfast
- First service: 19 January 2015; 11 years ago
- Current operator: Northern Railway

Route
- Termini: Hazur Sahib Nanded (NED); Una Himachal (UHL)
- Stops: 24
- Distance travelled: 1,878 km (1,167 mi)
- Average journey time: 33 hours 15 minutes
- Service frequency: Weekly
- Train number: 22457 / 22458

On-board services
- Classes: AC 3 Tier, Sleeper Class, General Unreserved
- Seating arrangements: Yes
- Sleeping arrangements: Yes
- Catering facilities: No
- Observation facilities: Large windows
- Baggage facilities: No
- Other facilities: Below the seats

Technical
- Rolling stock: LHB coach
- Track gauge: 1,676 mm (5 ft 6 in)
- Operating speed: 56 km/h (35 mph) average including halts.
Route map
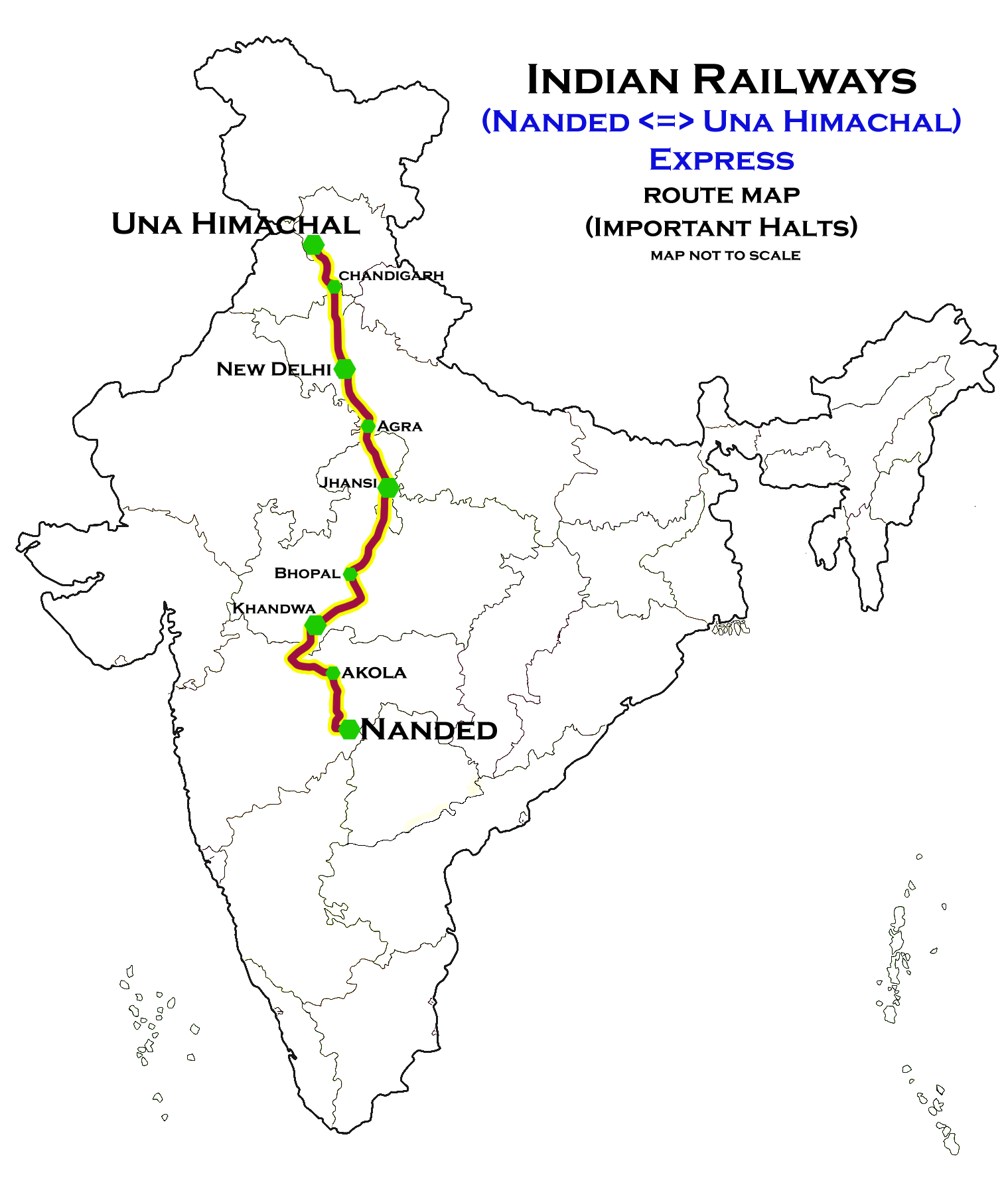

The 22457 / 22458 Hazur Sahib Nanded–Una Himachal Express is a superfast train belonging to Indian Railways-Northern Railway zone that runs between Hazur Sahib Nanded and Una Himachal in India. However, the train has now been discontinued or renumbered/renamed as Hazur Sahib Nanded- Amb Andaura Express (22709 / 22710).

== Service ==
It operated as train number 22457 from Hazur Sahib Nanded to Una Himachal and as train number 22458 in the reverse direction, serving the states of Maharashtra, Madhya Pradesh, Uttar Pradesh, Delhi, Haryana, Punjab & Himachal Pradesh. The train covered the distance of 1,878 km (1,167 mi) in 33 hours 15 mins approximately at a speed of (56.5 km/h (35.1 mph)).

== Coaches ==
The 22457 / 58 Hazur Sahib Nanded–Una Himachal Express had one AC 2-Tier, two AC 3-tier, three sleeper class, six general unreserved & two SLR (seating with luggage rake) coaches . It didn't carry a pantry car.

As with most train services in India, coach composition may be amended at the discretion of Indian Railways depending on demand.

== Routeing ==
The 22457 / 58 Hazur Sahib Nanded Una Himachal Express used to run from Hazur Sahib Nanded via Purna Junction, Akola Junction, Itarsi Junction, Bhopal Junction, Bina Junction, Agra Cantonment, New Delhi, Ambala Cantonment Junction to Una Himachal.

== Traction ==
As this route is fully electrified, an Ghaziabad-based electric WAP-4 loco pulls the train up to its destination.
