= Akot railway station =

Railway Station in Maharashtra, India

General information
- Location: Akola district, Maharashtra; India
- Coordinates: 21.0956°N 77.0466°E
- Elevation: 307.306 metres (1,008.22 ft)
- System: Indian Railways station
- Owner: Indian Railways
- Operator: Nanded railway division
- Line: Akola–Ratlam rail line
- Platforms: 2
- Tracks: 4
- Connections: Auto stand

Construction
- Structure type: Broad gauge
- Parking: No
- Cycle facilities: No

Other information
- Status: Functioning
- Station code: AKOT
- Fare zone: South Central Railway

History
- Opened: 1961
- Rebuilt: 2019
Location
- Location within India Location within Maharashtra

Akot railway station is a small railway station in Akola district, Maharashtra. Its code is AKOT. It serves Akot city. The station consists of two platforms. The platforms are not well sheltered. It lacks many facilities including water and sanitation. The station was opened in 1961, and it lies on Akola–Khandwa metre-gauge section of Hyderabad railway division of South Central Railway and now to Nanded railway division.

== See also ==
- Akola–Ratlam line
