= Washim railway station =

Railway station in India

Washim
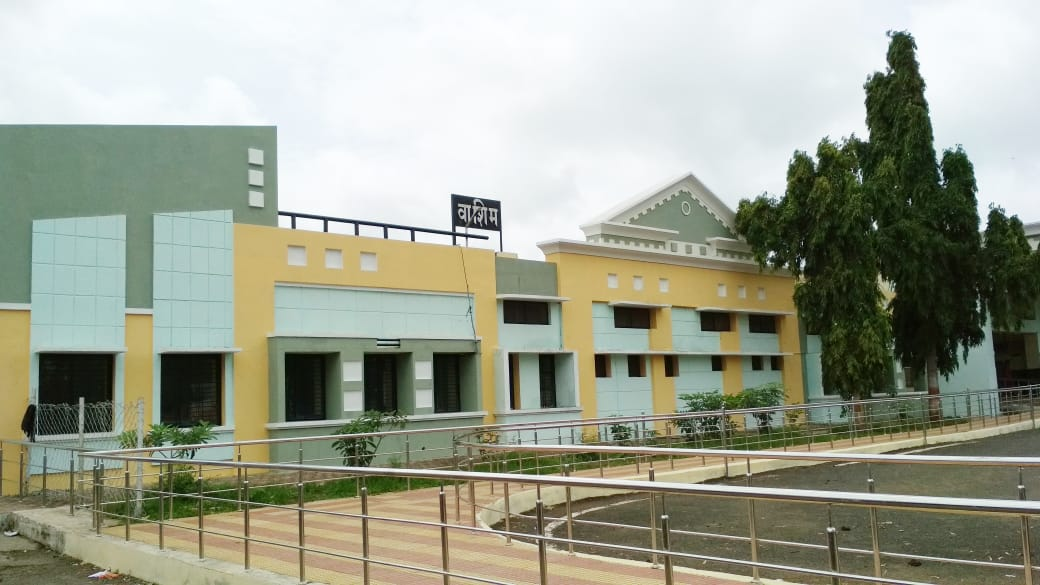
- Washim railway station

General information
- Location: State Highway 204, Washim, Maharashtra; India
- Coordinates: 20.103°N 77.148°E
- Elevation: 555 metres (1,821 ft)
- System: Indian Railways station
- Owner: Indian Railways
- Operator: South Central Railway
- Line: Purna-Akola line
- Platforms: 3
- Tracks: 4
- Connections: Auto stand

Construction
- Structure type: At grade
- Parking: Yes
- Cycle facilities: No

Other information
- Status: Functioning
- Station code: WHM
- Zone(s): South Central Railway
- Division(s): Nanded
Location
- Location within India Location within Maharashtra

Washim railway station is a midd size railway station in Washim district, in Vidharbha region of the Maharashtra. Its code is WHM. It serves Washim city. The station consists of three platforms. The platforms are well sheltered. It lacks many facilities including water and sanitation.

The station lies on Purna-Akola line of South Central Railway. It was in Hyderabad railway division of SCR and now is in Nanded railway division after bifurcation of Hyderabad railway division. Washim was connected to the broad-gauge railway network in 2008 when tracks were extended from Purna to Akola.

== Trains ==
Some of the trains that runs from Washim are:

- Hazur Sahib Nanded–Bikaner Weekly Express
- Parali-Akola Internetcity
- Hyderabad-Jaipur Superfast Express
- Hazur Sahib Nanded–Ajmer SpecialFare Special
- Pune–Amravati Express
- Kurnool City-Jaipur Superfast Express
- Nagpur–Kolhapur CSMT Express (via Hingoli, Latur)
- Indore–Yesvantpur Weekly Express
- Secunderabad–Jaipur Express
- Kacheguda–Narkher Intercity Express via New Amravati
- Kacheguda–Akola InterCity Express
- Ajmer–Kacheguda SpecialFare Urs Special
- Ajni–Mumbai LTT Express (via Aurangabad)
- Hazur Sahib Nanded–Una Himachal (Weekly) Superfast Express
- Amritsar–Hazur Sahib Nanded Superfast Express
- Hyderabad–Ajmer Superfast Express
- Tirupati–Amravati Bi Weekly Superfast Express
- Hazur Sahib Nanded–Sriganganagar Express
- Amravati–Tirupati Biweekly Superfast Express

== See also ==
- Hingoli Deccan railway station
