= Chudawa =

Village in Maharashtra

- Village/Railway station
- Location in Maharashtra Chudawa (India)
- Coordinates: 19.1805379°N 77.020966°E
- Country: India
- State: Maharashtra
- District: Parbhani

Government
  - Type: Gram panchayat
- Elevation: 384 m (1,260 ft)

Population (2011)
  - Total: 3,657
- Demonym: Chudawekar

Languages
  - Official: Marathi
- Time zone: UTC+5:30 (IST)
- PIN: 431511
- Telephone code: 02452
- Vehicle registration: MH-22

Chudawa or Chudava is a village and railway station on Purna taluka of Parbhani district in Indian state of Maharashtra. It is 12 km away from Purna.

== Demography ==
- As per 2011 census, Chudawa has total 696 families residing. Village has population of 3,657 of which 1,853 were males while 1,804 were females.
- Average Sex Ratio of village is 974 which is higher than Maharashtra state average of 929.
- Literacy rate of village was 74% compared to 82.95% of Maharashtra. Male literacy rate was 85.5% while female literacy rate was 63%.
- Schedule Caste (SC) constitutes 30% of total population while Schedule Tribe was 2.7%.

== Railway station ==
Chudawa railway station, whose code is CRU, is a part of Indian Railways' South Central Railway zone. It lies at an elevation of 392 metres (1,286 ft) and is in Hazur Sahib Nanded division of Parbhani district. The station is served by 16 daily diesel trains and has two platforms.

== Distances ==
Following table shows distance of Chudawa from some of major cities.

City	Distance (km)
Nanded	20
Purna	12
Basmat	20
Loha	27
Parbhani	42
Aurangabad	221
Mumbai	526

== village administration ==
Administration in chudawa village.

SARPANCH ( VILLAGE HEAD ) - RANJANA SHRIDHAR DESAI

DEPUTY SARPANCH - SUBHASH PANDURANG DESAI

school and colleges	Name of the institute
school	Guru jamnadas maharaj primary school, chudawa
school	ZP high school, chudawa.
school	kendriya primary school, chudawa
College	chatrapati sambhaji jr. college, chudawa
