= Nageshpur =

- Village
- Location in Odisha, India
- Coordinates: 20.418366°N 86.198945°E
- Country: India
- State: Orissa
- District: Cuttack

Languages
  - Official: Oriya
- Time zone: UTC+5:30 (IST)
- Vehicle registration: OR-
- Nearest city: Salipur
- Lok Sabha constituency: kendrapara
- Vidhan Sabha constituency: mananga
- Website: odisha.gov.in

Nagaspur is a village in the district of Cuttack in Odisha, India. It is present on the bank of the Chitroptala river in the neighbourhood of village, Lemalo. It is famous for the performance of Jatra folk theatre culture.

In 2015, researchers from the Odisha Institute of Maritime and South-east Asian Studies learned that a number of predominantly Hindu villages in Odisha, including Nagaspur, were worshipping Buddhist icons under the belief that they were representations of Hindu gods such as Indra.
