= Visakhapatnam–Tirupati Express =

Train in India

Overview
- Service type: Express
- Status: Active
- Locale: Andhra Pradesh and Tamil Nadu
- First service: 6 April 2026; 57 days ago
- Current operator: South Coast Railway (SCoR)

Route
- Termini: Visakhapatnam Junction (VSKP); Tirupati (TPTY)
- Stops: 22
- Distance travelled: 764 km (475 mi)
- Average journey time: 14h 20m
- Service frequency: Weekly
- Train number: 18507 / 18508

On-board services
- Classes: General Unreserved, Sleeper Class, AC 3rd Class, AC 2nd Class
- Seating arrangements: Yes
- Sleeping arrangements: Yes
- Catering facilities: Pantry Car
- Observation facilities: Large windows
- Baggage facilities: No
- Other facilities: Below the seats

Technical
- Rolling stock: LHB coach
- Track gauge: 1,676 mm (5 ft 6 in)
- Electrification: 25 kV 50 Hz AC Overhead line
- Operating speed: 130 km/h (81 mph) maximum, 53 km/h (33 mph) average including halts.
- Track owner: Indian Railways
Route map
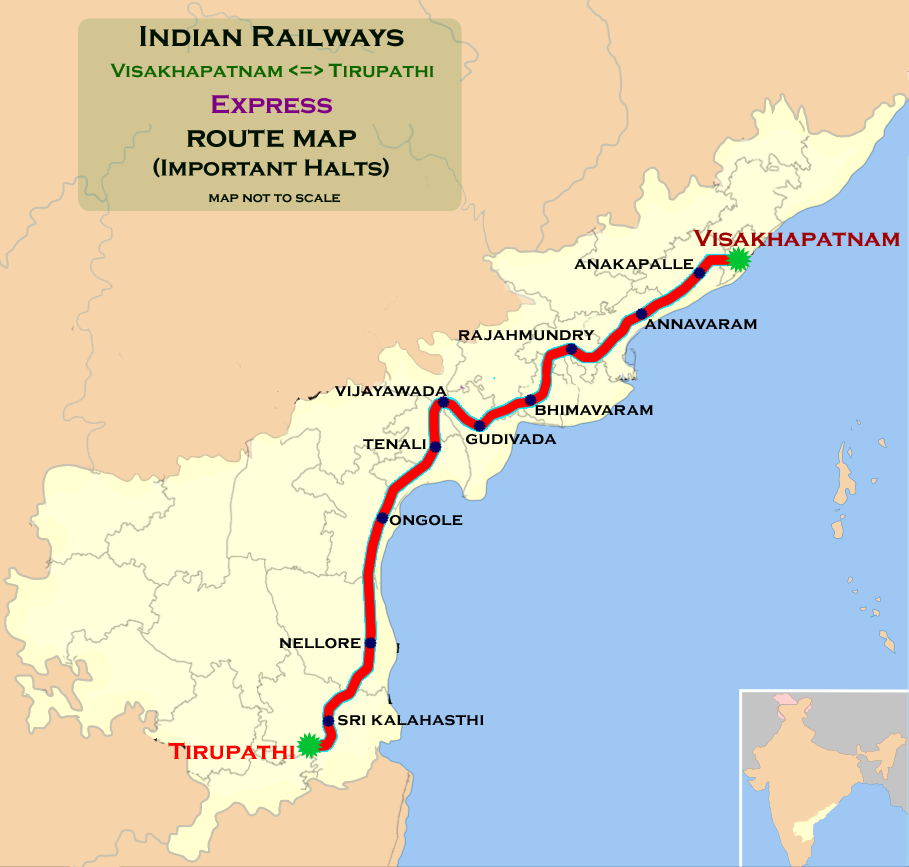

The 18507 / 18508 Visakhapatnam–Tirupati Express is an express train belonging to South Coast Railway zone that runs between the city Visakhapatnam Junction of Andhra Pradesh and Tirupati of Andhra Pradesh in India.

It operates as train number 18507 from Visakhapatnam Junction to Tirupati and as train number 18508 in the reverse direction, serving the states of Andhra Pradesh and Tamil Nadu.

== Services ==
• 18507/ Visakhapatnam–Tirupati Express has an average speed of 53 km/h and covers 764 km in 14h 20m.

• 18508/ Tirupati–Visakhapatnam Express has an average speed of 49 km/h and covers 764 km in 15h 40m.

== Route and halts ==
The important halts of the train are :

- Visakhapatnam Junction
- Duvvuda
- Anakapalle
- Elamanchili
- Annavaram
- Samalkot Junction
- Rajahmundry
- Nidadavolu Junction
- Tanuku
- Bhimavaram Town
- Akividu
- Kaikaluru
- Gudivada Junction
- Vijayawada Junction
- Tenali Junction
- Chirala
- Ongole
- Nellore
- Gudur Junction
- Srikalahasti
- Renigunta Junction
- Tirupati

== Schedule ==
• 18507 – 7:10 pm (Monday) [Visakhapatnam Junction] • 18508 – 9:50 pm (Wednesday) [Tirupati]

== Coach composition ==
1. General Unreserved – 4
2. Sleeper Class – 6
3. AC 3rd Class – 7
4. AC 3 tier Economy - 1
5. AC 2nd Class – 1
6. Pantry car - 1
7. SLR - 1
8. EOG - 1

== Traction ==
As the entire route is fully electrified, it is hauled by a Royapuram Shed-based WAP-7 electric locomotive from Visakhapatnam Junction to Tirupati and vice versa.

== Rake reversal or rake share ==
The train will rake sharing with Visakhapatnam–Bhagat Ki Kothi Express (18573/18574).

== See also ==
Trains from Visakhapatnam Junction :

1. Ratnachal Express
2. Visakhapatnam–Secunderabad Duronto Express
3. Visakhapatnam–Hazur Sahib Nanded Superfast Express
4. Visakhapatnam Swarna Jayanti Express
5. Korba–Visakhapatnam Express

Trains from Tirupati :

1. Tirupati–Sainagar Shirdi Weekly Express (via Guntur)
2. Tirupati–Chikkmagaluru Weekly Express
3. Narayanadri Express
4. Howrah–Tirupati Humsafar Express
5. Tirupati–Karimnagar Superfast Express

== Notes ==
a. Runs one day in a week with both directions.
