= Nanded railway division =

Railway division of India

Nanded railway division is one of the three railway divisions the jurisdiction of South Central Railway zone of the Indian Railways. This railway division was formed on 1 April 2003 and its headquarter is located at Nanded in the state of Maharashtra in India. Secunderabad railway division and Hyderabad railway division are the other railway divisions under SCR Zone headquartered at Secunderabad.

== Routes & Jurisdiction ==
Section	Type of track	Traction	Distance
Mudkhed Jn-Hazur Sahib Nanded -Purna Junction -Parbhani Jn(B.G.)	Double	Electric	81 km
Parbhani Jn-Chhatrapati Sambhajinagar railway station-Manmad Jn(excl) (B.G.)	Single	Electric	290 km
Mudkhed Jn-Adilabad-Pimpal khuti(excl) (B.G.)	Single	Electric	185 km
Parbhani Jn-Parli Vaijnath(excl) (B.G.)	Single	Electric	64 km
Purna Junction -Akola Jn(excl)(B.G.)	Single	Electric	208 km
Akola Jn(excl)-Akot(B.G.)-Khandwa Jn(excl)(Meter Gauge)	Single	Electric	176 km
Total			1001 km Route

- Electrification of all the sections except akola-khandwa has been sanctioned and the work is under progress .
- Gauge conversion is under progress between Akot and khandwa Jn(excl).

The list includes the stations under the Nanded division and their station category.

Category of station	No. of stations	Names of stations
A-1	3	Chhatrapati Sambhajinagar, Hazur Sahib Nanded, Parbhani Junction
A	3	Purna Junction, Jalna, Nagarsol
B	3	Mudkhed, Adilabad
C (Suburban Station)	-	-
D	12	Akot, Potul, Gangakher, Hingoli Deccan, Manwath Road, Partur, Rotegaon, Selu, Kinwat, Bhokar, Himayatnagar, Washim & Mukundwadi Halt
E	60	
F (Halt Station)	23	Chikhalthana, Mukundwadi Halt
Total	103	-

== See also ==
- Zones and divisions of Indian Railways
