= Mudkhed =

- Town
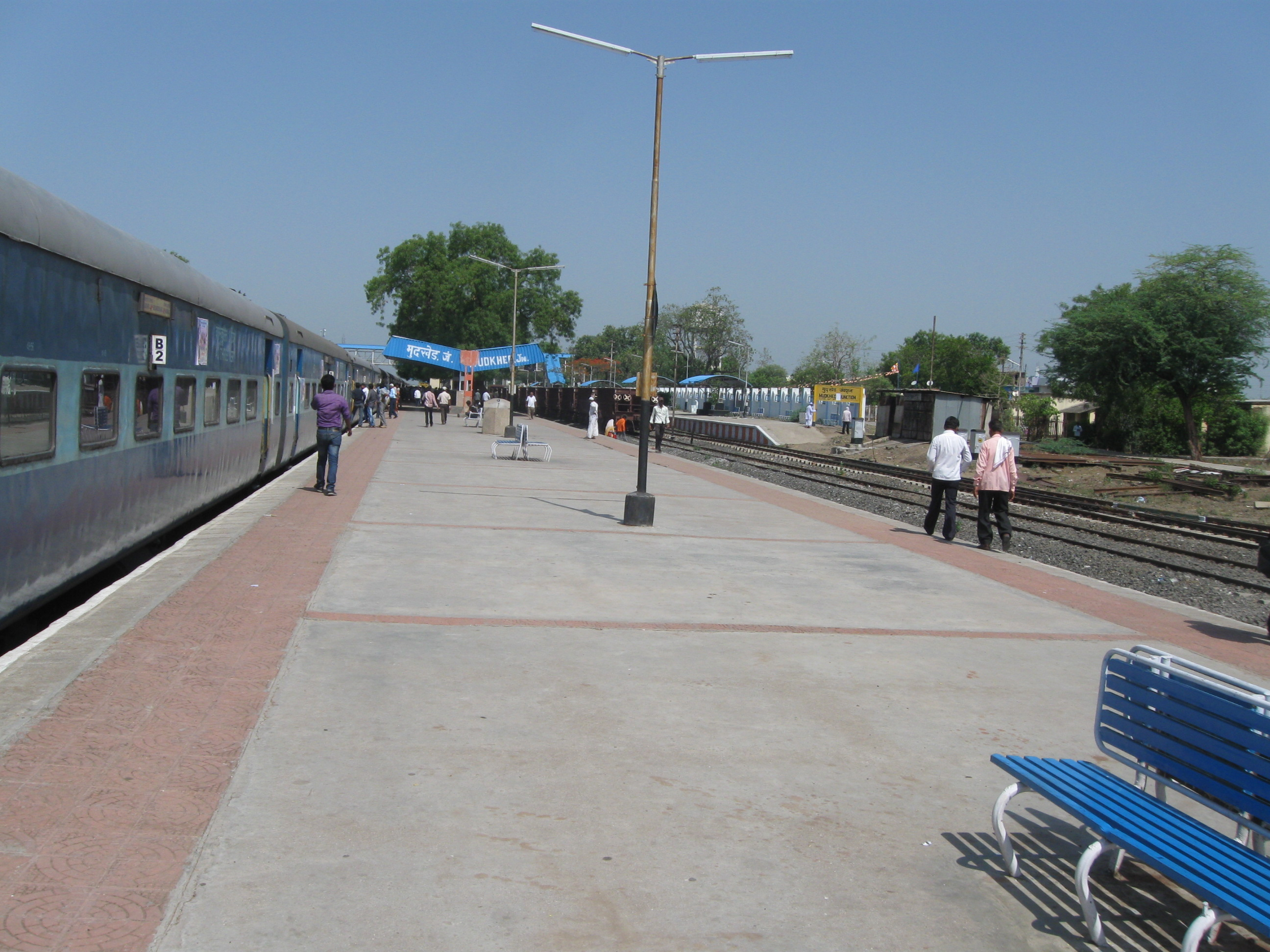
- A view of the Mudkhed Railway Station

- Location in Maharashtra, India Mudkhed (India)
- Coordinates: 19.148°N 77.503°E
- Country: India
- State: Maharashtra
- District: Nanded
- Elevation: 371 m (1,217 ft)

Population (2011)
  - Total: 23,517

Languages
  - Official: Marathi
- Time zone: UTC+5:30 (IST)
- 431806: 431806
- Vehicle registration: MH-26

Mudkhed is a city and a municipal council in Nanded District in the Indian state of Maharashtra. well known for Flower merchants.

== Demographics ==
Year	Male	Female	Total Population	Change	Religion (%)							
Year	Male	Female	Total Population	Change	Hindu	Muslim	Christian	Sikhs	Buddhist	Jain	Other religions and persuasions	Religion not stated
2001	9856	8844	18700	-	54.342	32.390	0.321	0.225	12.321	0.299	0.000	0.102
2011	12647	10870	23517	+25.8%	56.002	32.032	0.298	0.174	11.001	0.106	0.000	0.387

== Transport ==
Mudkhed Junction as in 2010 is the junction of three railway lines. A Broad gauge line goes to Mumbai, a Broad gauge line to be goes to Nagpur, and another broad gauge line goes to Secunderabad.

Mudked is located 24 km (15 mi) towards east from district headquarters Nanded and 571 km (355 mi) towards east from State capital Mumbai.

CRPF Training College, Mudkhed was established in September 1996 by Shankarrao Chavan.

== Mudkhed Taluka ==
Mudkhed taluka pin code 431806 consists of 65 Villages and 51 Panchayats. Amrapur (Dudhanwadi) is the smallest Village and Barad is the biggest Village. More than 100,000 people living in 16,586 Houses in Mudkhed taluka of 65 villages while Mudkhed town has around 25,000 population.

Different flowers are grown in Mudkhed, including Rose, Mogra, and Kakda. it also has bananas and sugarcane. it has a municipal council of total 18 members including President Mujeeb Ahmed Ameeruddin Ansari and Chief Officer Ramraje Kapre.

Shri. Anand Deulgaonkar is current Tahsildar.

== See also ==
- Mukhed
