= Hingoli Deccan railway station =

Railway Station in Maharashtra, India

Hingoli Deccan

General information
- Location: Hingoli, Maharashtra 431513; Maharashtra India
- Coordinates: 19°43′38″N 77°08′51″E
- Elevation: 463 metres (1,519 ft)
- System: Indian Railway station
- Line: Purna-Akola line
- Platforms: 2
- Tracks: 4

Construction
- Structure type: At grade
- Parking: Yes
- Cycle facilities: Yes

Other information
- Status: Active
- Station code: HNL
- Zone(s): South Central Railway
- Division(s): Nanded

History
- Opened: 1954

Passengers
- 5,000 per day
Location
- Location within India Location within Maharashtra

Hingoli Deccan railway station is a railway station in Hingoli in Marathwada region of the Maharashtra. Its code is HNL. It serves Hingoli city. The station consists of two platforms. The platforms are well sheltered. The station lies on Purna-Akola line of South Central Railway. It was in Hyderabad railway division of SCR and now is in Nanded railway division after bifurcation of Hyderabad railway division. Hingoli was connected to the broad-gauge railway network in 2008 when tracks were extended from Purna.

== Amenities ==
Amenities at Hingoli railway station include: computerized reservation office, waiting room, benches, and book stall.

== See also ==
- High-speed rail in India
- Indian Railways
- Hingoli District
- Rail transport in India
- List of railway stations in India

== Doubling ==
Not Double line
