= Adilabad railway station =

Railway station in Telangana, India

Adilabad
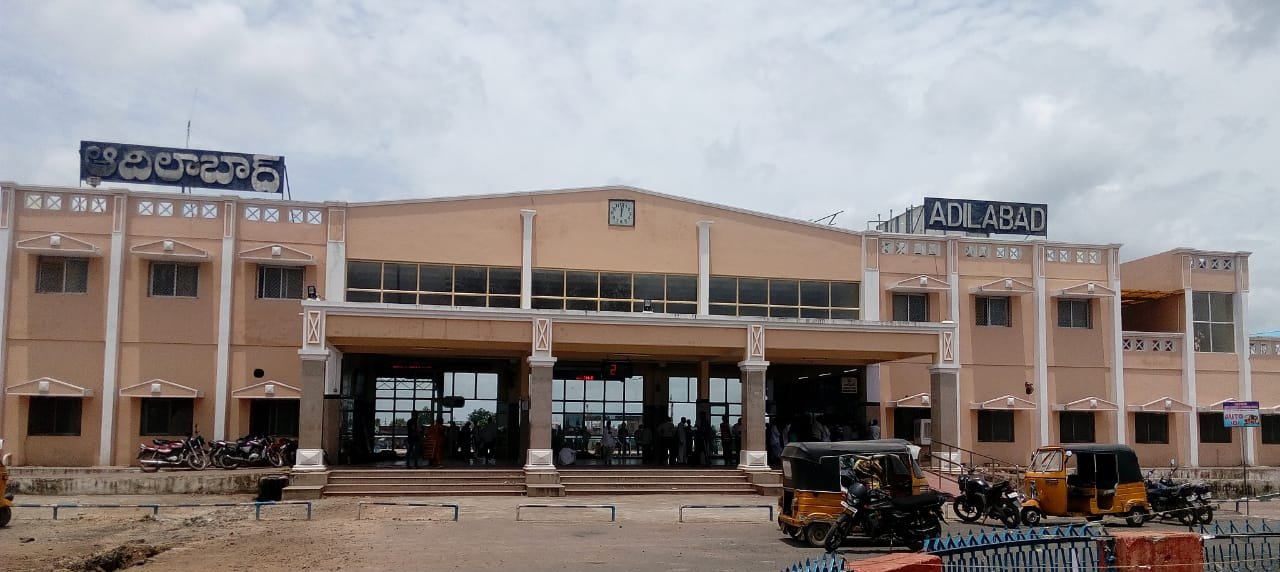

General information
- Location: National Highway 7, Adilabad, Telangana; India
- Coordinates: 19°40′50″N 78°32′10″E
- System: Indian Railways station
- Owner: Indian Railways
- Operator: South Central Railway zone
- Line: Majri-Mudkhed line
- Platforms: 3

Construction
- Structure type: At grade
- Parking: Yes

Other information
- Status: Functioning
- Station code: ADB
- Zone(s): South Central Railway
- Division(s): Nanded
- Fare zone: Indian Railways

Services
Preceding station	Indian Railways	Following station
Pimpalkhuti towards ?	South Central Railway zone	Umram towards ?
Location
- Location within Telangana

Adilabad railway station (station code: ADB) is a fifth grade non-suburban (NSG–5) category Indian railway station in Nanded railway division of South Central Railway zone. It serves the city of Adilabad in the Indian state of Telangana. It was selected as one of the 21 stations to be developed under Amrit Bharat Stations scheme.

== Services ==
Adilabad is connected to many cities in the country.

=== List of trains ===
Train No.	Train name
01045 / 01046	Deekshabhoomi Express (via Latur)
11401 / 11402	Nandigram Express
12767 / 12768	Hazur Sahib Nanded–Kolkata Santragachi Superfast Express
17609 / 17610	Patna–Purna Express
17405 / 17406	Krishna Express
17409 / 17410	Adilabad–Nanded Express
11083 / 11084	Tadoba Express Lokmanya Tilak Terminus–Kazipet Junction
57551 / 57552	Adilabad–Purna Passenger
57553 / 57554	Adilabad–Parli Vaijnath Passenger
