= Mudkhed Junction railway station =

Railway Station in Maharashtra, India

Mudkhed Junction
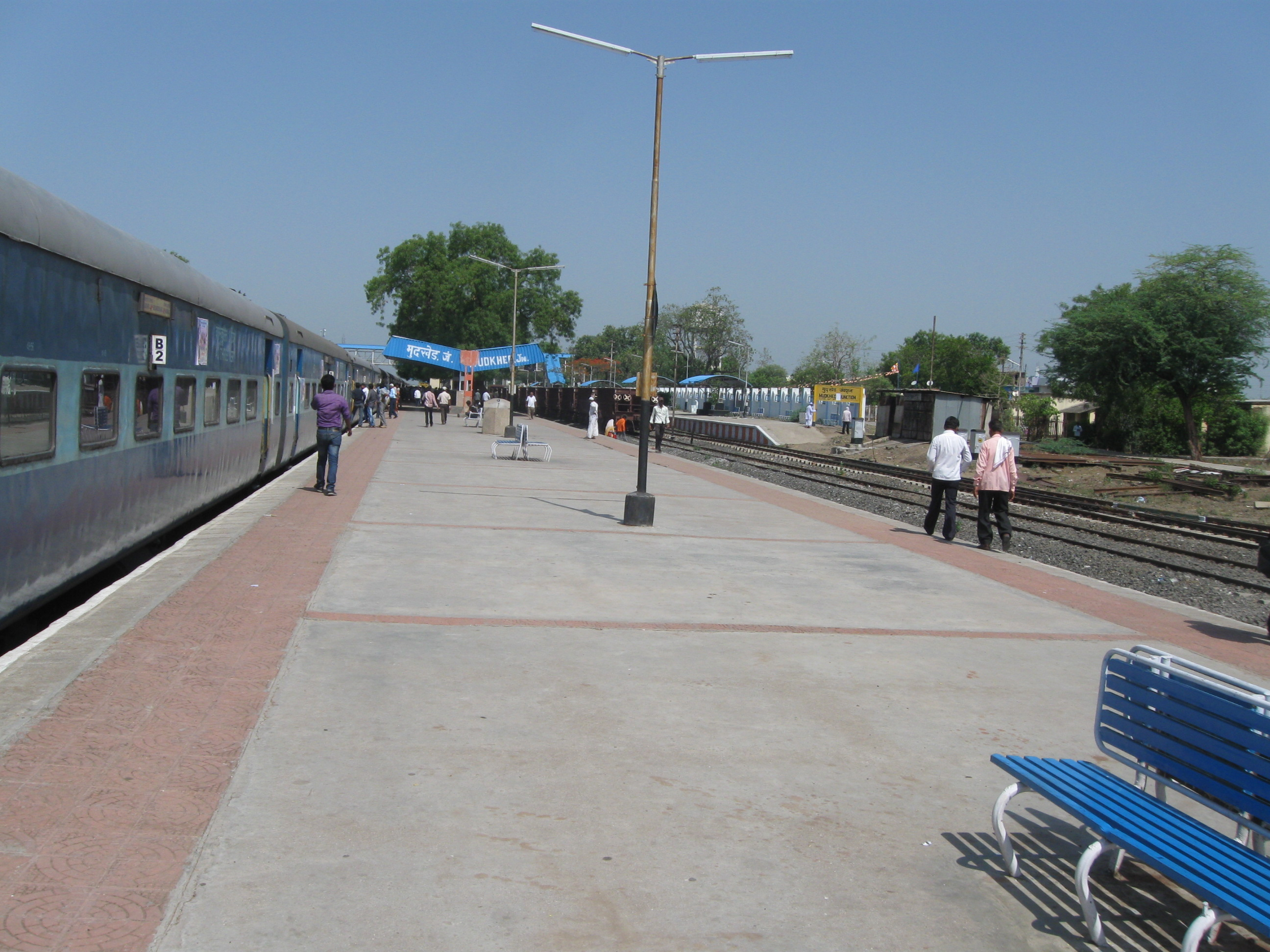
- Mudkhed railway station

General information
- Location: Mudkhed, Nanded, Maharashtra; India
- Coordinates: 19.1479°N 77.5097°E
- Elevation: 378 metres (1,240 ft)
- System: Indian Railways station
- Owner: Indian Railways
- Operator: South Central Railways
- Lines: Secunderabad–Manmad line, Mudkhed–Adilabad section
- Platforms: 4
- Tracks: 5

Construction
- Structure type: At grade

Other information
- Status: Functioning
- Station code: MUE
- Zone(s): South Central Railway
- Division(s): Nanded
Location
- Location within Maharashtra Location within India

Mudkhed Junction railway station is junction railway station serving the town of Mudkhed in Nanded district of Maharashtra. The station is located on Secunderabad–Manmad line and falls under Nanded railway division of South Central Railway.

A railway line to Adilabad, Wani and Majri Junction on Ballarshah–Sewagram Junction–Nagpur Junction section of New Delhi–Chennai line, branches off in the North-east.

The major stations near Mudkhed are Hazur Sahib Nanded railway station on west and Nizamabad railway station on east.

== Routes ==
- Mudkhed–Nizamabad Junction–Secunderabad Junction
- Mudkhed–Hazur Sahib Nanded–Purna Junction–Parbhani Junction
- Mudkhed–Adilabad–Majri Junction
