= Purna =

Purna पूर्णा
- Town
- Location in Maharashtra, India
- Coordinates: 19.18°N 77.05°E
- Country: India
- State: Maharashtra
- District: Parbhani

Government
  - Body: Municipal Council
- Elevation: 384 m (1,260 ft)

Population (2011)
  - Total: 36,433
- Demonym: Purnakar

Languages
  - Official: Marathi
  - Other: Urdu
- Time zone: UTC+5:30 (IST)
- PIN: 431511
- Vehicle registration: MH-22
- Website: parbhani.gov.in

Purna is a town with a municipal council in the Parbhani district of Maharashtra, India.

== Geography ==
Purna is located at 20.91°N 73.75°E. It has an average elevation of 384 metres (1,260 ft).

Purna is situated in the Maharashtra state of India.

== Demographics ==
As of 2011 India census, Purna had total 6,663 houses and population of 36,433. Males constitute 51% of the population and females 49%. Purna has an average literacy rate of 71.95, lower than the national average of 75%: male literacy is 79% and female literacy is 65.11%. In Purna, 14% of the population is under 6 years of age.

== Rail transport ==
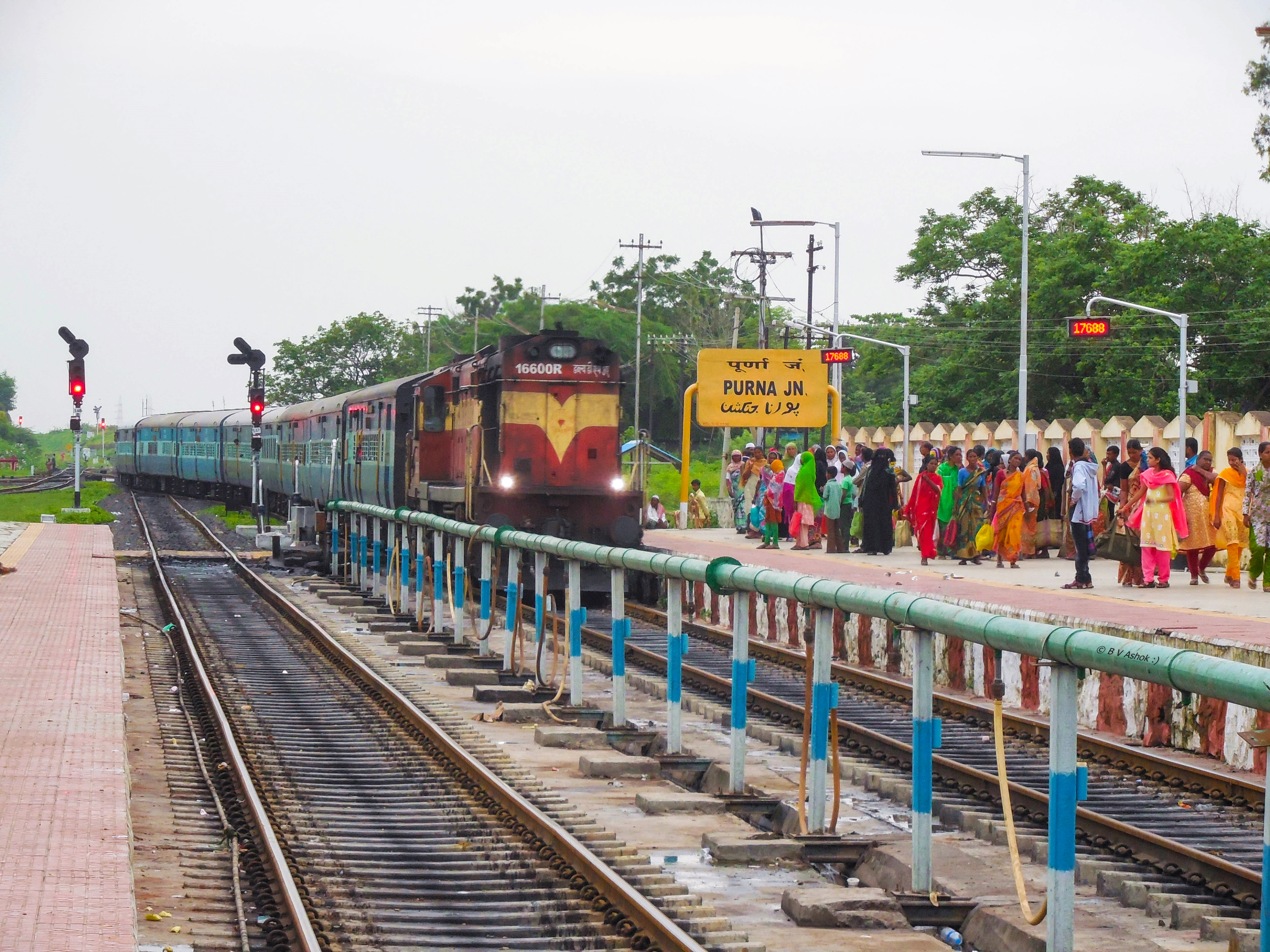
Marathwada Express at Purna Junction

Purna Junction railway station (station code: PAU) is on the Kachiguda–Manmad section of Nanded (NED) Division of South Central Railway (SCR). In the meter gauge era Purna was the most important junction. Hundreds of railway employees were then stationed at Purna. At the time, nearly 50% of the population of the city was made up of railway employees and their families. Purna has massive land occupied by the Railway Department for staff quarters, filling point, washing area, etc. Railway Department has its own schools in Marathi and English, community cultural hall, sports complexes, and fields. The economy of the city was mainly dependent of the railway population. All the trains then would halt here for 20 minutes to 90 minutes. The crew would change here and fueling/watering to the trains would be done here. The engines of the majority trains would be changed here then. The railway population had then enriched the sports culture of the city. After creation of the Nanded division, all major operations of railways were diverted from Purna junction to Nanded. Since then the city lost its prosperity and the economy of the city had an enormous adverse effect on it. After Divisional adjustments in 2003, Purna now comes under the Nanded (NED) Division of SCR. Purna has rail connectivity with Manmad, Aurangabad, Nanded, Parbhani, Parli Vaijnath, Latur, Osmanabad, Gangakhed, Mudkhed, Adilabad, Nagpur, Basar, Nizamabad, Nashik, Mumbai, Delhi, Pune, Daund, Mahbubnagar, Kurnool, Kadapa, Renigunta, Tirupati, Katpadi, Erode, Madurai and Kachiguda (HYB).

Ajanta Express between Secunderabad and Manmad is the most prestigious train passing through this station. There are a number of trains running regularly toward Mumbai and Telangana. Purna is connected to Ajmer and Jaipur by train as passengers from nearby cities have to catch this train from Purna. Purna is an important junction in Nanded Division. It has a line branching off to Akola and further to Khandwa.

The Purna name is given by Purna River. Purna's historical name is "Lasina".

== See also ==
- Chudawa
