= Purna Junction railway station =

Railway Station in Maharashtra, India

Purna Junction
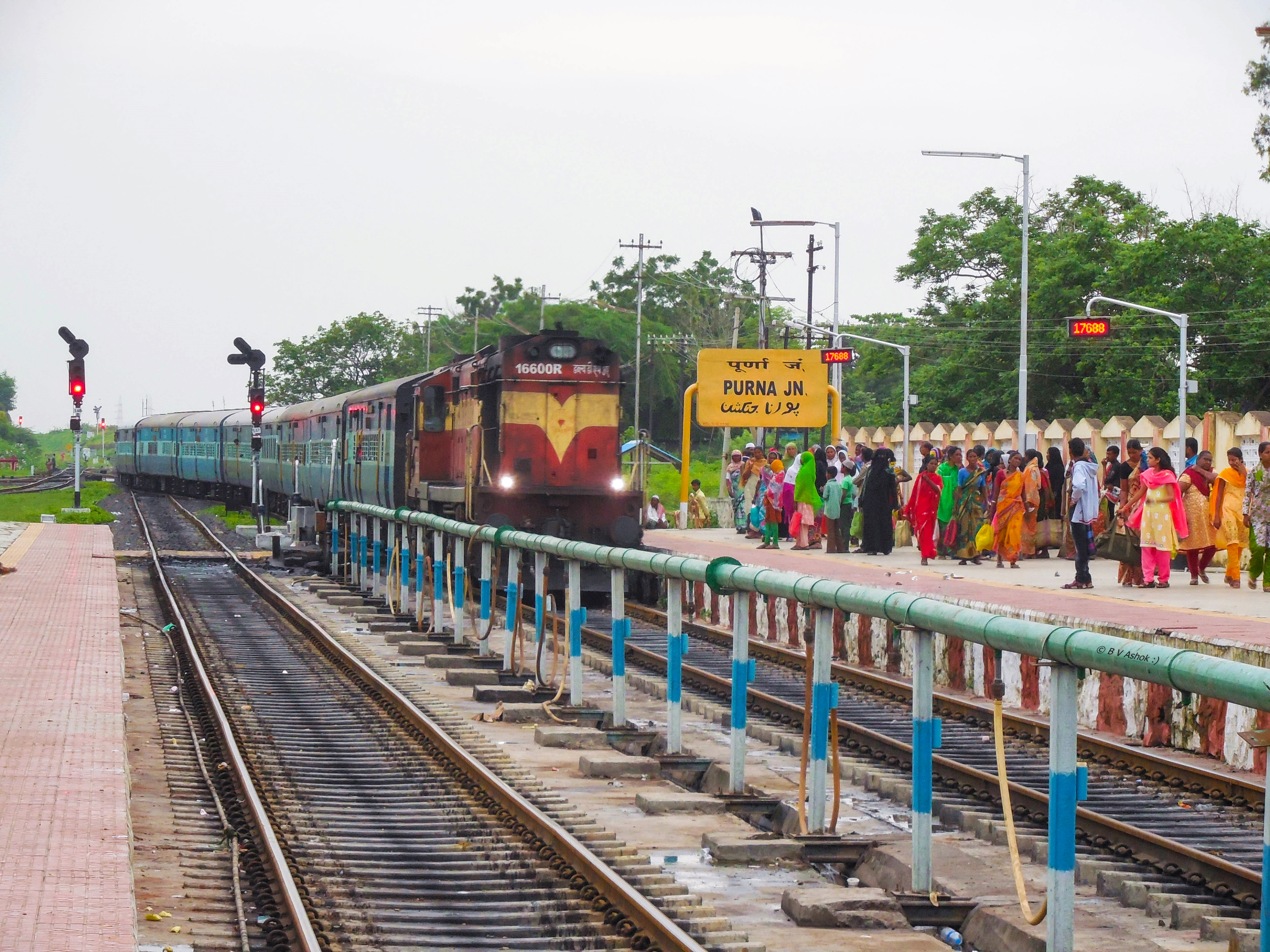
- Marathwada Express at Purna

General information
- Location: State Highway 148, Purna, Maharashtra; India
- Coordinates: 19.1810°N 77.0256°E
- Elevation: 384 metres (1,260 ft)
- System: Indian Railways station
- Owner: Indian Railways
- Operator: South Central Railways
- Lines: Secunderabad–Manmad line Purna–Akola line
- Platforms: 4
- Tracks: 8
- Connections: Auto stand

Construction
- Structure type: At grade
- Parking: Yes
- Cycle facilities: Yes
- Accessible: Available

Other information
- Status: Functioning
- Station code: PAU
- Zone(s): South Central Railway
- Division(s): Nanded
Location
- Location within Maharashtra Location within India

Purna Junction railway station is a main railway station in Parbhani district, Maharashtra. Its code is PAU. It serves Purna city. The station consists of four platforms. Purna has rail connectivity with Manmad, Aurangabad, Jalna, Nanded, Parbhani, Parli Vaijnath, Latur, Osmanabad, Gangakhed, Mudkhed, Adilabad, Nagpur, Basar, Nizamabad, Nasik, Dhanbad, Mumbai, Delhi, Pune, Miraj, Daund, Mahbubnagar, Kurnool, Kadapa, Renigunta, Tirupati, Katpadi, Erode, Madurai and Kachiguda.,

== Trains ==
- Ajanta Express
- Deekshabhoomi Express
- Kacheguda-Akola Intercity Express
- Pune-Amravati Express (via Latur)
- Hazur Sahib Nanded–Shri Ganganagar Weekly Express
- Lokmanya Tilak Terminus–Ajni Express
- Ajmer–Hyderabad Meenakshi Express
- Nizamabad–Lokmanya Tilak Terminus Express
- Narasapur–Nagarsol Express (via Warangal)
- Daund–Hazur Sahib Nanded Passenger
- Lokmanya Tilak Terminus–Hazur Sahib Nanded Express
- Nagpur–CSMT Kolhapur Express (via Usmanabad)
- Sainagar Shirdi–Visakhapatnam Express
- Tirupati–Sainagar Shirdi Express
- Yesvantpur–Indore Weekly Express
- Sachkhand Express
- Tapovan Express
- Tirupati–Amravati Express
- Hazur Sahib Nanded–Una Himachal Express
- Patna–Purna Express
- Firozpur Cantt. - Hazur Sahib Nanded Weekly Express

== Originating trains ==
- Akola–Purna Passenger
- Hyderabad–Purna Passenger
- Parli Vaijnath–Purna Passenger
- Purna–Adilabad Passenger
- Patna–Purna Express
