= Akola Junction railway station =

Railway station in Maharashtra, India

Akola Junction
- Indian Railways logo

General information
- Location: Akola, Maharashtra, 444001; India
- Coordinates: 20°43′24″N 77°00′21″E
- Elevation: 284 metres (932 ft)
- System: Indian Railways junction station
- Owner: Indian Railways
- Operator: Indian Railways
- Lines: Howrah–Nagpur–Mumbai line Nagpur–Bhusawal section Akola–Ratlam line Purna-Akola line
- Platforms: 6
- Tracks: 15

Construction
- Structure type: At ground
- Parking: Available

Other information
- Status: Operational
- Station code: AK
- Zone(s): CR
- Division(s): Bhusawal railway division

History
- Opened: 7 November 1867; 158 years ago
- Electrified: 1989–90

Passengers
- approximately 70000 per Day
Location
- Location within Maharashtra
- Interactive map

Akola Junction (station code:- AK) serves City of Akola in Akola district in the Indian state of Maharashtra. It is one of the most important top 100 booking railway junction in india.on the Howrah–Nagpur–Mumbai line. There is a 5 ft 6 in (1,676 mm) broad gauge line to Washim- Hingoli- Purna -Nanded Secunderabad railway station and Akola -Akot–Khandwa Ratlam line is under gauge conversion. Indian Railway Classifies Akola Junction As Grade 'A' Category Nsg-3 Station. The Station has Important railway Transpotation in Vidharbh region it Operated by Indian Railway under Central Railway Zone with Part of The Bhusaval Railway Akola junction occupies an important position in railway Network of Central India because several roots serving Easten Western Northern and Southern part of country. Akola junction serves by several Primium and long distance Trains services of Indian railways This include Vande Bharat, AC Duranto,Humsafar,Amrit bharat, Garib Rath long distance sf trains Services

== History ==
The first train in India travelled from Mumbai to Thane on 16 April 1853. By May 1854, Great Indian Peninsula Railway's Bombay–Thane line was extended to Kalyan. Bhusawal railway station was set up in 1860 and in 1867 the GIPR branch line was extended to Nagpur.

=== Electrification ===
The railways in the Bhusawal area were electrified in 1989–90.

== Gauge conversion ==
There earlier existed a 1,469 kilometres (913 mi)-long metre-gauge line from Jaipur to Secunderabad via Akola. Out of this Jaipur to Indore and the Secunderabad–Purna–Akola sections have already been converted to 5 ft 6 in (1,676 mm) broad gauge and in 2021 was electrified to Purna junction. Conversion of the Ratlam–Akola section was approved for conversion in 2008 work until Mhow has been completed and conversion of Mhow–Khandwa already began. Akola- Akot conversion of broad gauge is completed and trains on this route has been started. There are three stages of work on Akola Khandwa line. Presently the Khandawa Akot section is incomplete because there are many forest and animal issues. This route goes from Melghat Tiger Reserve, so there are many issues about the safety of animals.

== Traffic ==
Akola railway station is amongst the top hundred booking stations of Indian Railway. 153 trains (including weeklies and bi-weeklies) pass through Akola railway station Some Important train are origin from Akola Jn 1)Akola Kacheguda Intercity express 2)Akola Tirupati Express 3)Akola Kollam Sabrimala Express 5)Akola Purna Express 6)Akola Akot Memu 7)Akola Parli vaijnath Passenger.

== Akola Hydrabad Express ==
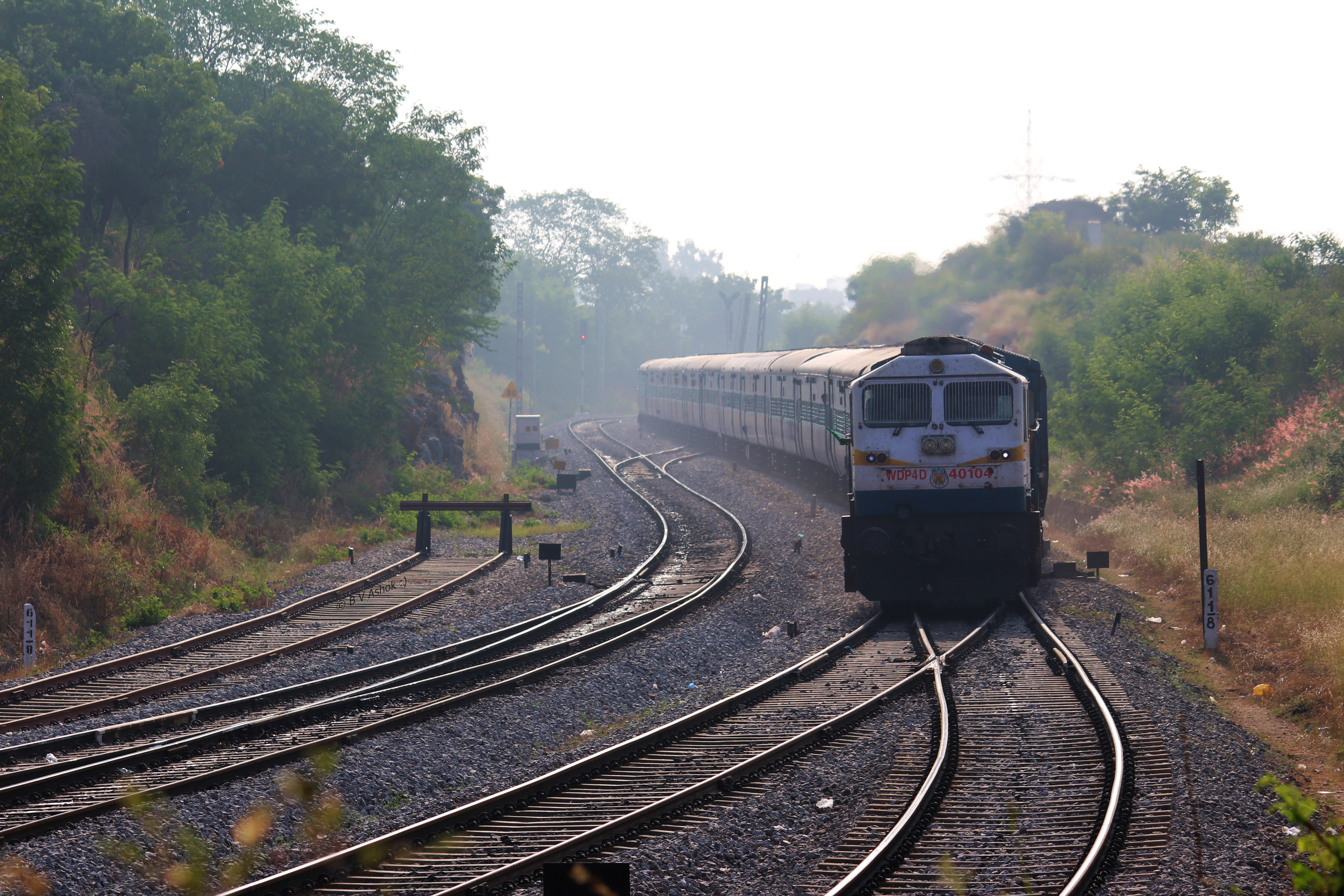
Kacheguda Akola Intercity Express train passing from the platform

Preceding station	Indian Railways	Following station
Yvalkhed towards ?	Central Railway zone Howrah–Nagpur–Mumbai line	Gaigaon towards ?
Terminus	Central Railway zone Akola–Secunderabad line	Shivani Shivapur towards ?
Terminus	Central Railway zone Akola–Ratlam MG line	Kinkhed towards ?
