= Saykheda =

Village in Maharashtra

Saikheda Chandori
- Country: India
- State: Maharashtra.
- District: Nashik

Saykheda is a village in India in Niphad, Nashik district in the Indian state of Maharashtra.

== Geography ==
The village is sited near the bank of Godavari River. The village is 25 km away from Nashik and 16 km from Niphad. Nearby villages are Bhendali, Chandori, Naygaon, Songaon, Chatori.

Nearby is Nandur Madhmeshwar Bird Sanctuary, Sinnar Taluka, Ozar, Nashik District, Pimpalgaon Baswant, etc. Nandur Madhmeshwar Bird Sanctuary is 12 km away.

== Demographics ==
Marathi is the most spoken language.

== Facilities ==
Every Thursday a weekly market is conducted, attracting people from nearby villages.

== Education System ==
Students from nearby villages attend Saykheda educational institutions. Educational institutes include:

- Maratha vidya prasarak samaj's Arts, Commerce and Science college
- Swami shatkopacharyaji Maharaj Arts, Commerce and Science college
- Modern English School
- Zilla Parishad Prathmik Shala.
