= Niphad Assembly constituency =

Constituency of the Maharashtra legislative assembly in India

Coordinates: 20.079°N 74.108°E

Niphad
- Constituency No. 121 for the Maharashtra Legislative Assembly

Constituency details
- Country: India
- Region: Western India
- State: Maharashtra
- District: Nashik
- Lok Sabha constituency: Dindori
- Established: 1957
- Total electors: 299,614
- Reservation: None

Member of Legislative Assembly
- 15th Maharashtra Legislative Assembly
- Incumbent Diliprao Shankarrao Bankar
- Party: NCP
- Alliance: NDA
- Elected year: 2024

Niphad Assembly constituency is one of the 288 Vidhan Sabha (legislative assembly) constituencies of Maharashtra state in western India.

== Overview ==
It is a part of the Dindori Lok Sabha constituency along with five other assembly constituencies, viz Kalvan, Chandwad, Yevla, Nandgaon, and Dindori.

== Members of Legislative Assembly ==
Year	Member	Party
1957	Wagh Deoram Sayaji	Communist Party of India
1962	Dattatreya Patil	Indian National Congress
1967	Dattatreya Patil	Indian National Congress
1972	Dulaji Patil	Independent
1978	Vinayakdada Patil	Indian National Congress
1980	Malojirao Mogal	Indian National Congress (U)
1985	Malojirao Mogal	Indian Congress (Socialist)
1990	Malojirao Mogal	Indian National Congress
1995	Raosaheb Kadam	Shiv Sena
1999	Mandakini Kadam	Shiv Sena
2004	Diliprao Bankar	Nationalist Congress Party
2009	Anil Kadam	Shiv Sena
2014	Anil Kadam	Shiv Sena
2019	Diliprao Bankar	Nationalist Congress Party
2024	Diliprao Bankar	Nationalist Congress Party

== Election results ==
=== Assembly Election 2024 ===
2024 Maharashtra Legislative Assembly election : Niphad
Party	Candidate	Votes	%	±%
NCP	Diliprao Shankarrao Bankar	120,253	54.96	New
SS(UBT)	Anil Kadam	91,014	41.60	New
PHJSP	Gurudev Dwarkanath Kande	4,121	1.88	New
NOTA	None of the Above	1,501	0.69	▲0.08
Margin of victory		29,239	13.36	▲4.66
Turnout		220,294	73.53	▼1.68
Total valid votes		218,793		
Registered electors		299,614		▲10.23
NCP gain from NCP		Swing	▲7.51	

=== Assembly Election 2019 ===
2019 Maharashtra Legislative Assembly election : Niphad
Party	Candidate	Votes	%	±%
NCP	Diliprao Shankarrao Bankar	96,354	47.46	▲6.49
SS	Anil Kadam	78,686	38.75	▼4.37
BVA	Kadam Yatin Raosaheb	24,046	11.84	New
VBA	Santosh Vishnu Aherrao	2,667	1.31	New
NOTA	None of the Above	1,221	0.60	▼0.05
Margin of victory		17,668	8.70	▲6.54
Turnout		204,592	75.27	▲1.48
Total valid votes		203,041		
Registered electors		271,802		▲9.78
NCP gain from SS		Swing	▲4.33	

=== Assembly Election 2014 ===
2014 Maharashtra Legislative Assembly election : Niphad
Party	Candidate	Votes	%	±%
SS	Anil Kadam	78,186	43.13	▼12.93
NCP	Diliprao Shankarrao Bankar	74,265	40.96	▲5.54
BJP	Patil Vaikunth Vijay	18,031	9.95	New
INC	Mogal Rajendra Malojirao	5,871	3.24	New
BSP	Dharmendra Madhukar Jadhav	3,209	1.77	▲1.12
MNS	Holkar Subhash Sampatrao	1,360	0.75	▼2.65
NOTA	None of the Above	1,177	0.65	New
Margin of victory		3,921	2.16	▼18.47
Turnout		182,793	73.83	▲3.46
Total valid votes		181,299		
Registered electors		247,595		▲7.51
SS hold		Swing	▼12.93	

=== Assembly Election 2009 ===
2009 Maharashtra Legislative Assembly election : Niphad
Party	Candidate	Votes	%	±%
SS	Anil Kadam	90,065	56.06	▲33.11
NCP	Diliprao Shankarrao Bankar	56,920	35.43	▼18.18
MNS	Kadam Yatin Raosaheb	5,457	3.40	New
SWP	Dokhale Rajendra Sadashiv	4,531	2.82	New
Independent	Viste Kedu Tauji	1,527	0.95	New
BSP	Lokhande Pandit Bhimrao	1,049	0.65	▼0.89
Margin of victory		33,145	20.63	▼10.03
Turnout		160,744	69.80	▼1.47
Total valid votes		160,669		
Registered electors		230,305		▲6.33
SS gain from NCP		Swing	▲2.45	

=== Assembly Election 2004 ===
2004 Maharashtra Legislative Assembly election : Niphad
Party	Candidate	Votes	%	±%
NCP	Diliprao Shankarrao Bankar	82,706	53.61	▲27.10
SS	Kadam Mandakini Raosaheb	35,409	22.95	▼13.83
Independent	Boraste Manikrao Madhavrao	28,288	18.34	New
BSP	Barve Suresh Kashinath	2,373	1.54	New
Independent	Pithe Pandharinath Prabhakar	1,931	1.25	New
Independent	Kshirsagar Ramnath Dagu	1,827	1.18	New
Margin of victory		47,297	30.66	▲20.39
Turnout		154,283	71.23	▲10.03
Total valid votes		154,283		
Registered electors		216,593		▲12.79
NCP gain from SS		Swing	▲16.83	

=== Assembly Election 1999 ===
1999 Maharashtra Legislative Assembly election : Niphad
Party	Candidate	Votes	%	±%
SS	Kadam Mandakini Raosaheb	43,222	36.78	▼14.59
NCP	Bankar Dilip Shankar	31,157	26.51	New
Independent	Mogal Malojirao Sadashiv	20,610	17.54	New
INC	Bankar Bhaskarrao Namdevrao	19,917	16.95	▼29.01
Independent	Karad Namdeo Sadashiv	1,635	1.39	New
Margin of victory		12,065	10.27	▲4.86
Turnout		125,785	65.50	▲6.87
Total valid votes		117,528		
Registered electors		192,028		▲2.09
SS hold		Swing	▼14.59	

=== Assembly By-election 1997 ===
1997 Maharashtra Legislative Assembly by-election : Niphad
Party	Candidate	Votes	%	±%
SS	Kadam Mandakini Raosaheb	52,491	51.37	▼0.08
INC	Boraste Manikrao Madhavrao	46,967	45.96	▲3.05
JD	Kadam Sadanand Kacheshwar	1,883	1.84	New
Margin of victory		5,524	5.41	▼3.13
Turnout		104,516	55.57	▼21.88
Total valid votes		102,190		
Registered electors		188,089		▼0.19
SS hold		Swing	▼0.08	

=== Assembly Election 1995 ===
1995 Maharashtra Legislative Assembly election : Niphad
Party	Candidate	Votes	%	±%
SS	Kadam Raosaheb Bhaurao	73,885	51.45	▲24.20
INC	Mogal Malojirao Sadashiv	61,622	42.91	▲0.34
Independent	Rajole Shivaji Bhaurao	3,563	2.48	New
Independent	Kapase Ramesh Pundalik	2,282	1.59	New
PWPI	More Prabhakar Madhavrao	1,029	0.72	▼3.93
Independent	Gawali Damu Dada	933	0.65	New
Margin of victory		12,263	8.54	▼6.78
Turnout		148,067	78.57	▲10.32
Total valid votes		143,614		
Registered electors		188,452		▲16.30
SS gain from INC		Swing	▲8.88	

=== Assembly Election 1990 ===
1990 Maharashtra Legislative Assembly election : Niphad
Party	Candidate	Votes	%	±%
INC	Mogal Malojirao Sadashiv	45,447	42.57	▼3.44
SS	Shinde Gangadhar Narayan (G. N. )	29,088	27.24	New
Independent	Kadam Raosaheb Bhaurao	24,997	23.41	New
PWPI	Hande Vitthalao Ganapatrao	4,963	4.65	New
Independent	Gohad Bhanudas Dagadu	682	0.64	New
Margin of victory		16,359	15.32	▲8.85
Turnout		109,199	67.39	▲0.12
Total valid votes		106,765		
Registered electors		162,042		▲31.04
INC gain from IC(S)		Swing	▼9.91	

=== Assembly Election 1985 ===
1985 Maharashtra Legislative Assembly election : Niphad
Party	Candidate	Votes	%	±%
IC(S)	Mogal Malojirao Sadashiv	42,674	52.47	New
INC	Boraste Manikrao Madhavrao	37,411	46.00	New
Independent	Pagare Pandurang Murlidhar	489	0.60	New
Margin of victory		5,263	6.47	▼7.83
Turnout		82,930	67.07	▲5.63
Total valid votes		81,323		
Registered electors		123,655		▲6.95
IC(S) gain from INC(U)		Swing	▼3.06	

=== Assembly Election 1980 ===
1980 Maharashtra Legislative Assembly election : Niphad
Party	Candidate	Votes	%	±%
INC(U)	Mogal Malojirao Sadashiv	38,612	55.53	New
INC(I)	Boraste Madhavrao Kashiram	28,665	41.23	▲40.17
Independent	Joshi Prakash Raghunath	522	0.75	New
Independent	Pagare Yadav Ganpat	460	0.66	New
Margin of victory		9,947	14.31	▼23.79
Turnout		71,160	61.54	▼13.10
Total valid votes		69,528		
Registered electors		115,624		▲13.07
INC(U) gain from INC		Swing	▼12.98	

=== Assembly Election 1978 ===
1978 Maharashtra Legislative Assembly election : Niphad
Party	Candidate	Votes	%	±%
INC	Patil Vinayakrao Pudlikrao	51,315	68.52	▲19.36
Independent	Boraste Madhavrao Kashiram	22,786	30.42	New
INC(I)	Katkade Balkrishna Namdeo	792	1.06	New
Margin of victory		28,529	38.09	▲37.09
Turnout		76,657	74.96	▲9.50
Total valid votes		74,893		
Registered electors		102,261		▲15.43
INC gain from Independent		Swing	▲18.36	

=== Assembly Election 1972 ===
1972 Maharashtra Legislative Assembly election : Niphad
Party	Candidate	Votes	%	±%
Independent	Dulaji Sitaram Patil	28,322	50.16	New
INC	Vinayakrao P. Patil	27,755	49.16	▲11.1
Margin of victory		567	1.00	▼6.38
Turnout		58,198	65.69	▲0.49
Total valid votes		56,464		
Registered electors		88,593		▲29.38
Independent gain from INC		Swing	▲12.10	

=== Assembly Election 1967 ===
1967 Maharashtra Legislative Assembly election : Niphad
Party	Candidate	Votes	%	±%
INC	Dattatraye Bhikaji patil	16,481	38.06	▼16.69
SSP	P. N. Karad	13,282	30.67	New
Independent	M. K. Boraste	13,140	30.34	New
Margin of victory		3,199	7.39	▼18.03
Turnout		47,531	69.41	▲4.10
Total valid votes		43,308		
Registered electors		68,475		▼0.63
INC hold		Swing	▼16.69	

=== Assembly Election 1962 ===
1962 Maharashtra Legislative Assembly election : Niphad
Party	Candidate	Votes	%	±%
INC	Dattatraye Bhikaji Patil	22,312	54.75	▲24.69
CPI	Narayan Lakhuji Shinde	11,952	29.33	▼35.41
Independent	Deodhar Sitaram Dangale	2,225	5.46	New
Independent	Fakira Laxman Bhagare	1,995	4.89	New
ABJS	Sadashiv Eoram Holkar	1,842	4.52	New
Independent	Ganpat Gangaram Karate	430	1.06	New
Margin of victory		10,360	25.42	▼9.26
Turnout		44,526	64.61	▼6.19
Total valid votes		40,756		
Registered electors		68,911		▲15.12
INC gain from CPI		Swing	▼10.00	

=== Assembly Election 1957 ===
1957 Bombay State Legislative Assembly election : Niphad
Party	Candidate	Votes	%	±%
CPI	Wagh Deoram Sayaji	25,318	64.74	New
INC	More Ramrao Amrutrao	11,755	30.06	New
Independent	Karate Ganpat Gangaram	2,034	5.20	New
Margin of victory		13,563	34.68	
Turnout		39,107	65.33	
Total valid votes		39,107		
Registered electors		59,858		
CPI win (new seat)				

== See also ==
- Niphad
- List of constituencies of the Maharashtra Vidhan Sabha
