= Diliprao Shankarrao Bankar =

Indian politician

Dilip Bankar (born 1964) is an Indian politician from Maharashtra. He is an MLA from Niphad Assembly constituency in Nashik District. He won the 2019, 2024 Maharashtra Legislative Assembly election representing the Nationalist Congress Party.

== Early life and education ==
Bankar is from Niphad, Nashik District, Maharashtra. He is the son of Shankarrao Kondaji Bankar. He completed his B.Com. in 1985 at a college affiliated with the University of Pune.

== Career ==
Bankar won from Niphad Assembly constituency representing Nationalist Congress Party in the 2019 Maharashtra Legislative Assembly election. He polled 96,354 votes and defeated his nearest rival, Anil Kadam of Shiv Sena party, by a margin of 17,668 votes.
