= Panchvati Express =

Train in India

Panchavati Superfast Express
- 51st Anniversary of Panchavati Express

Overview
- Service type: Superfast
- First service: 1 November 1975; 51 years ago
- Current operator: Central Railway

Route
- Termini: Mumbai CSMT (CSMT); Manmad Junction (MMR)
- Stops: 8
- Distance travelled: 258 km (160 mi)
- Average journey time: 4 hours 43 minutes
- Service frequency: Daily
- Train number: 12109 / 12110

On-board services
- Classes: AC Chair Car, Second Class Seating, General Unreserved
- Seating arrangements: Yes
- Sleeping arrangements: No
- Auto-rack arrangements: Overhead racks
- Catering facilities: On-board catering, E-catering
- Observation facilities: Rake Sharing With 12071/12072 Mumbai Hingoli Janshatabdi Express
- Baggage facilities: Available
- Other facilities: Below the seats

Technical
- Rolling stock: LHB coach
- Track gauge: 1,676 mm (5 ft 6 in)
- Operating speed: 55 km/h (34 mph) average including halts.

The 12109 / 12110 Panchavati Superfast Express is a Superfast train that connects Mumbai with Manmad. It is a daily means of transport for passengers traveling between Mumbai, capital of Maharashtra and Nashik. It is lifeline of passengers from Manmad and Nashik, by this train thousands of commuters daily travel between Nashik and Mumbai. Every year Passengers celebrate its birthday. This train is recorded in the Limca book of records as an ideal train since the train preserves some of its features. It is one of the prestigious trains of Central Railways. It was introduced on 1 November 1975.

The train had the older numbers 1001/1002, and would run with a double decker rake from Bombay VT to Manmad. The double decker coaches were withdrawn in the mid to late 1990s and replaced with regular chair seats.

== Schedule ==
12110 UP Panchavati Express departs Manmad Junction at 06:02 IST and reaches Chhatrapati Shivaji Terminus (CST), Mumbai at 10:45 IST. 12109 DOWN Panchvati Express departs Chhatrapati Shivaji Terminus, Mumbai daily at 18:15 IST and reaches Manmad Junction at 22:50 IST The train covers a distance of 258 km between Manmad Junction and Chhatrapati Shivaji Terminus.

== Stoppage ==
After leaving Manmad Junction, the train have official halts at Lasalgaon, Niphad, Nasik Road, Deolali, Igatpuri, Kasara, Kalyan Junction and Dadar before reaching Mumbai CSMT.

== Rake/Coach composition ==
Coach position

- 12109 : MUMBAI CSMT->MANMAD

Locomotive-SLRD-GEN1-GEN2-GEN3-GEN4-GEN5-GEN6-GEN7-GEN8-GEN9-D9-D8-D7-D6-D5-D4-D3-D2-D1-C2-C1-EOG.; Total Coaches-22

- 12110 : MANMAD->MUMBAI CSMT

Locomotive-EOG-C1-C2-D1-D2-D3-D4-D5-D6-D7-D8-D9-GEN1-GEN2-GEN3-GEN4-GEN5-GEN6-GEN7-GEN8-GEN9-SLRD.; Total Coaches-22

== Traction ==
earlier it was used to run with WCAM-3, now Central Railway switching over completely to AC traction, it is now hauled from end to end by an Bhusawal-based WAP-7 and WAP-4 locomotive.

== Gallery ==
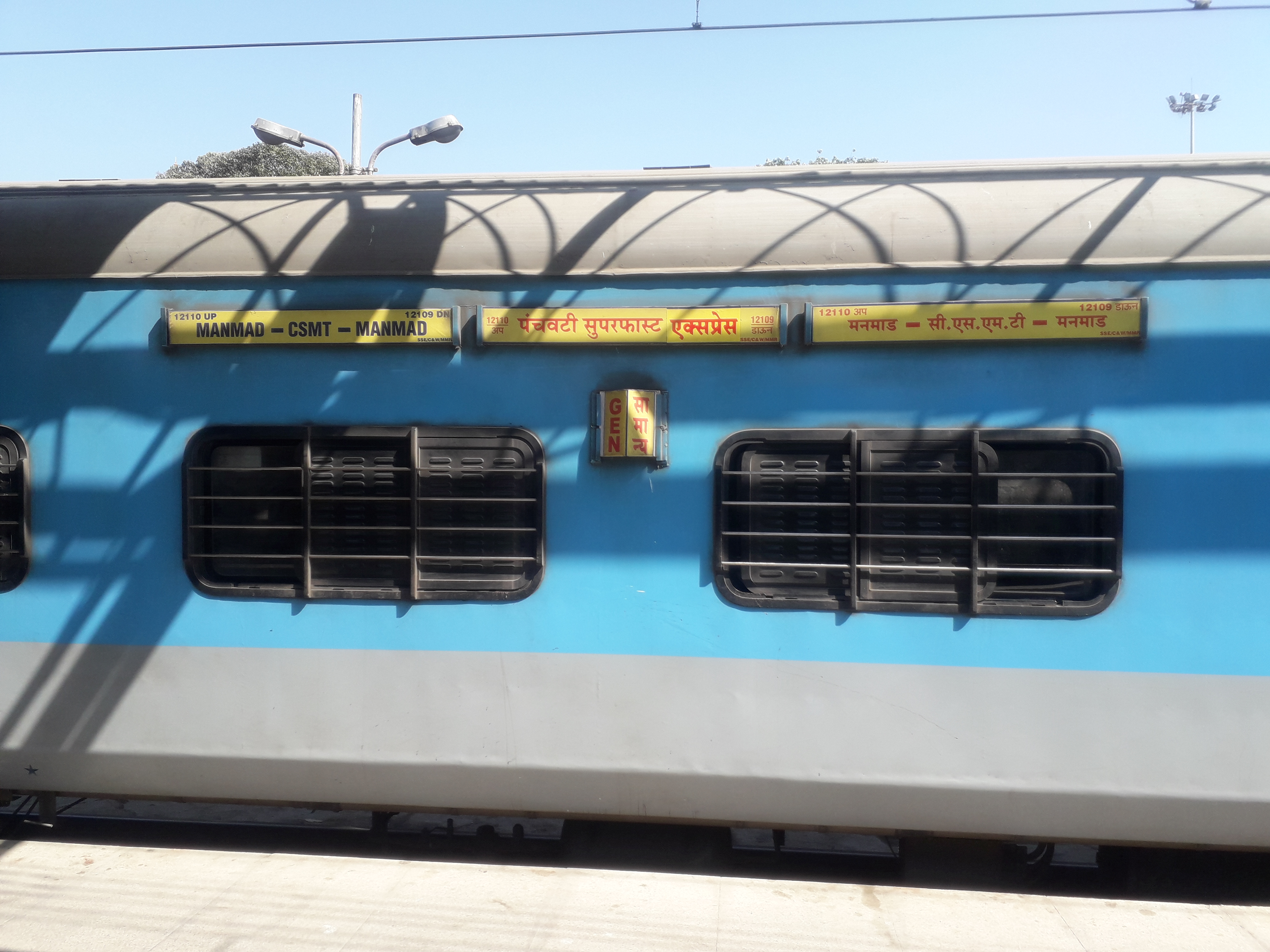
12109 Panchavati Express – General unreserved coach

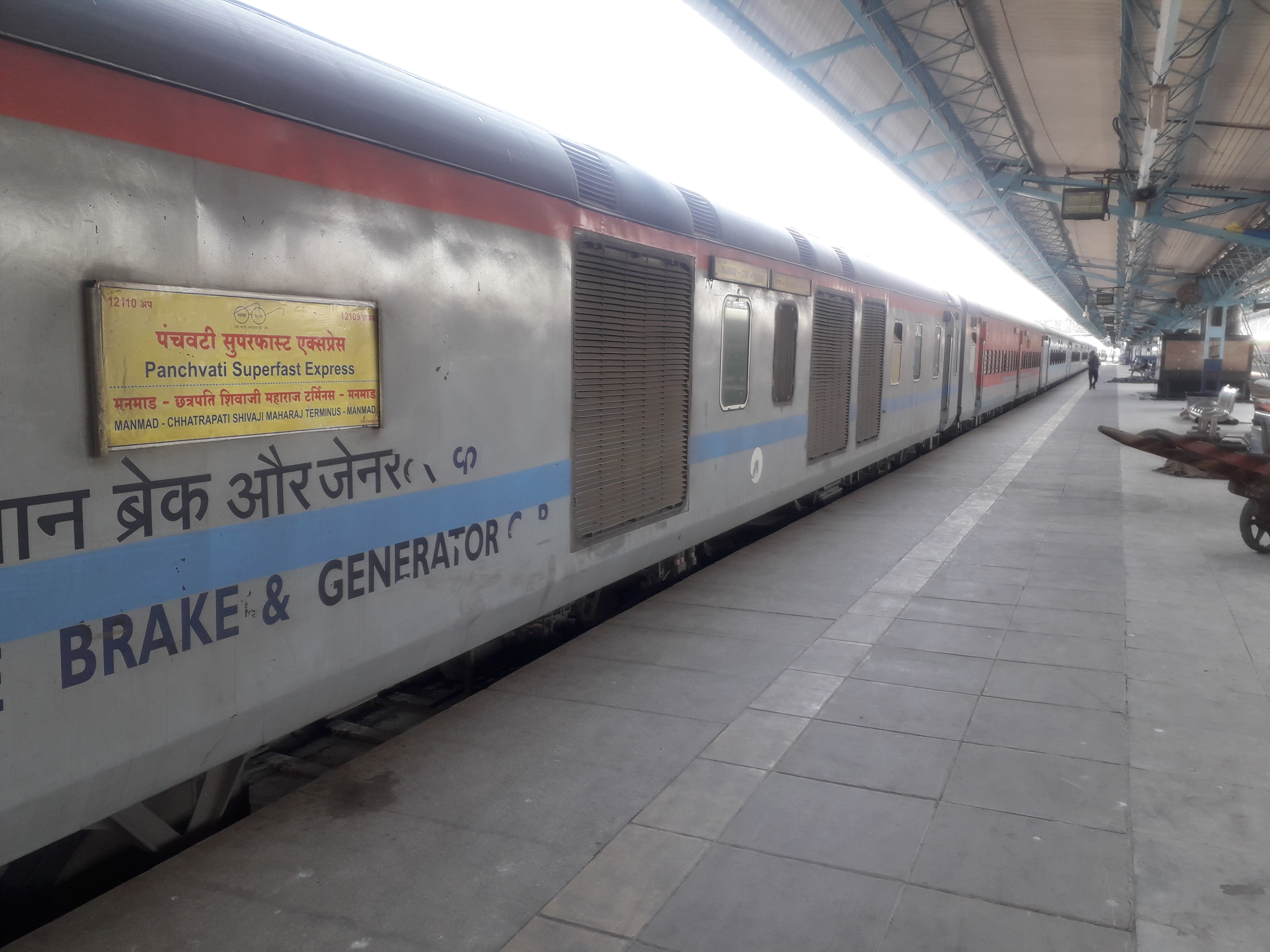
12109 Panchavati Express – Train at Chhatrapati Shivaji Maharaj Terminus

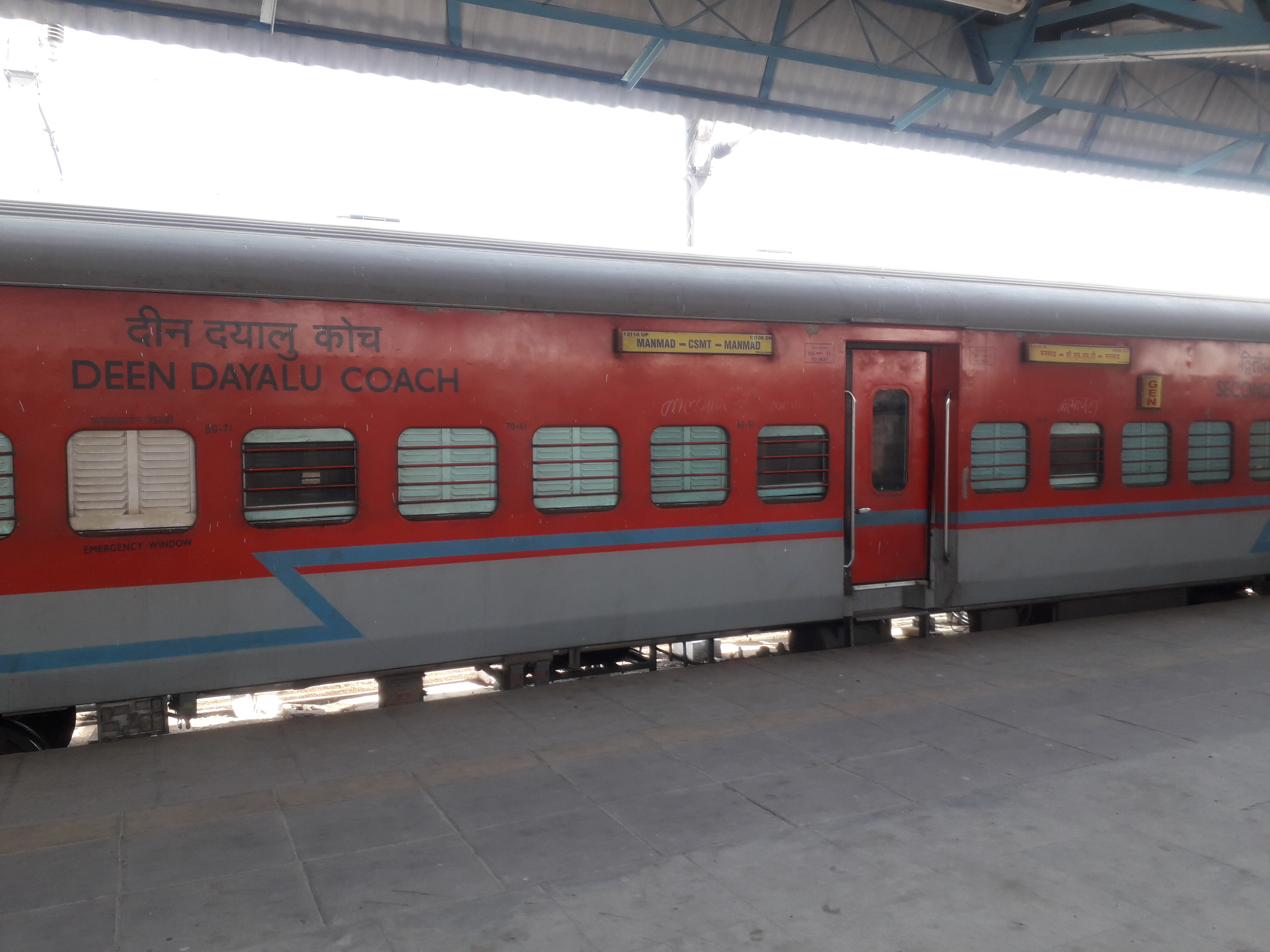
12109 Panchavati Express – General unreserved Deen Dayalu coach

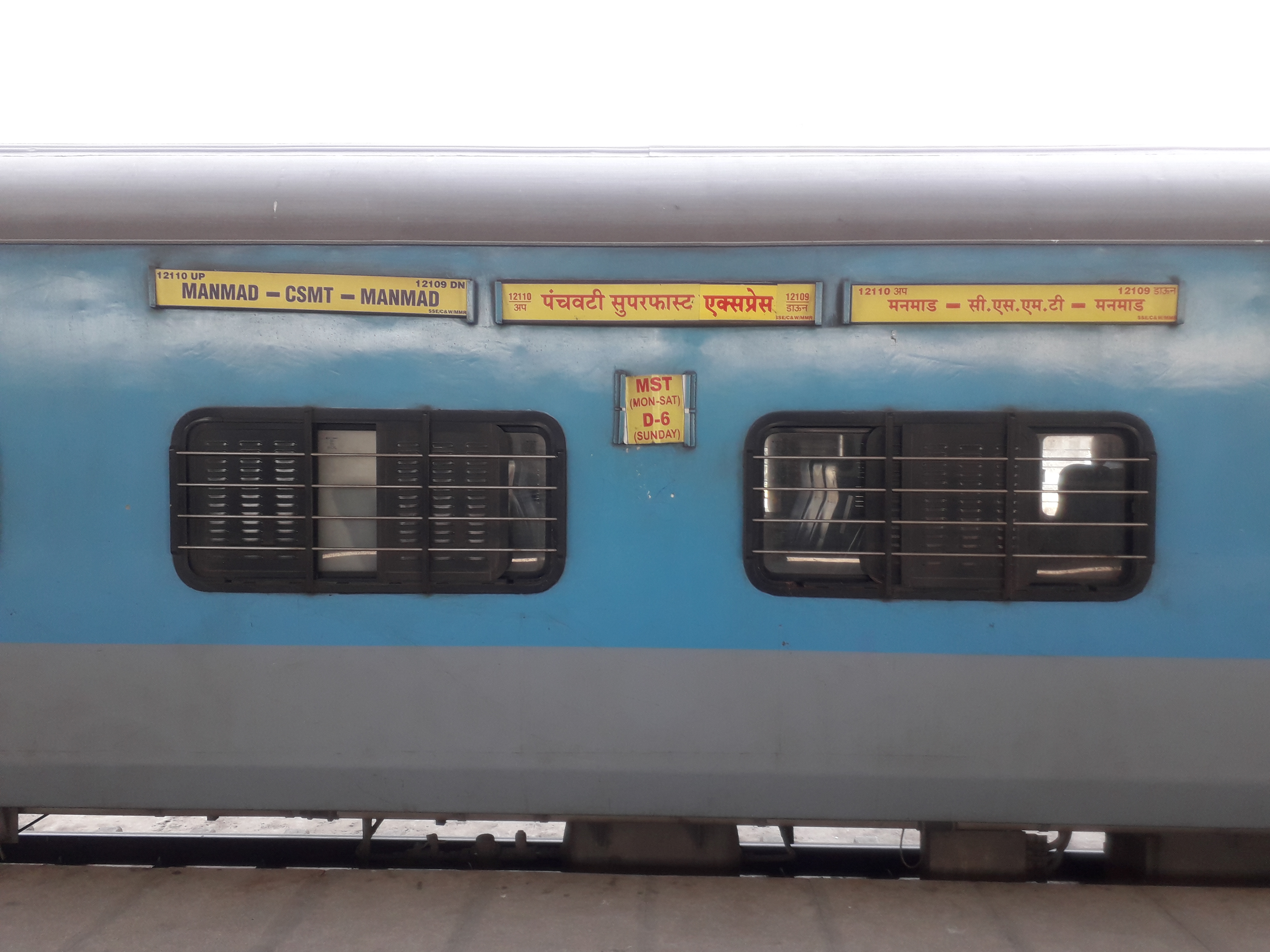
12109 Panchavati Express – 2nd Class seating (reserved) coach

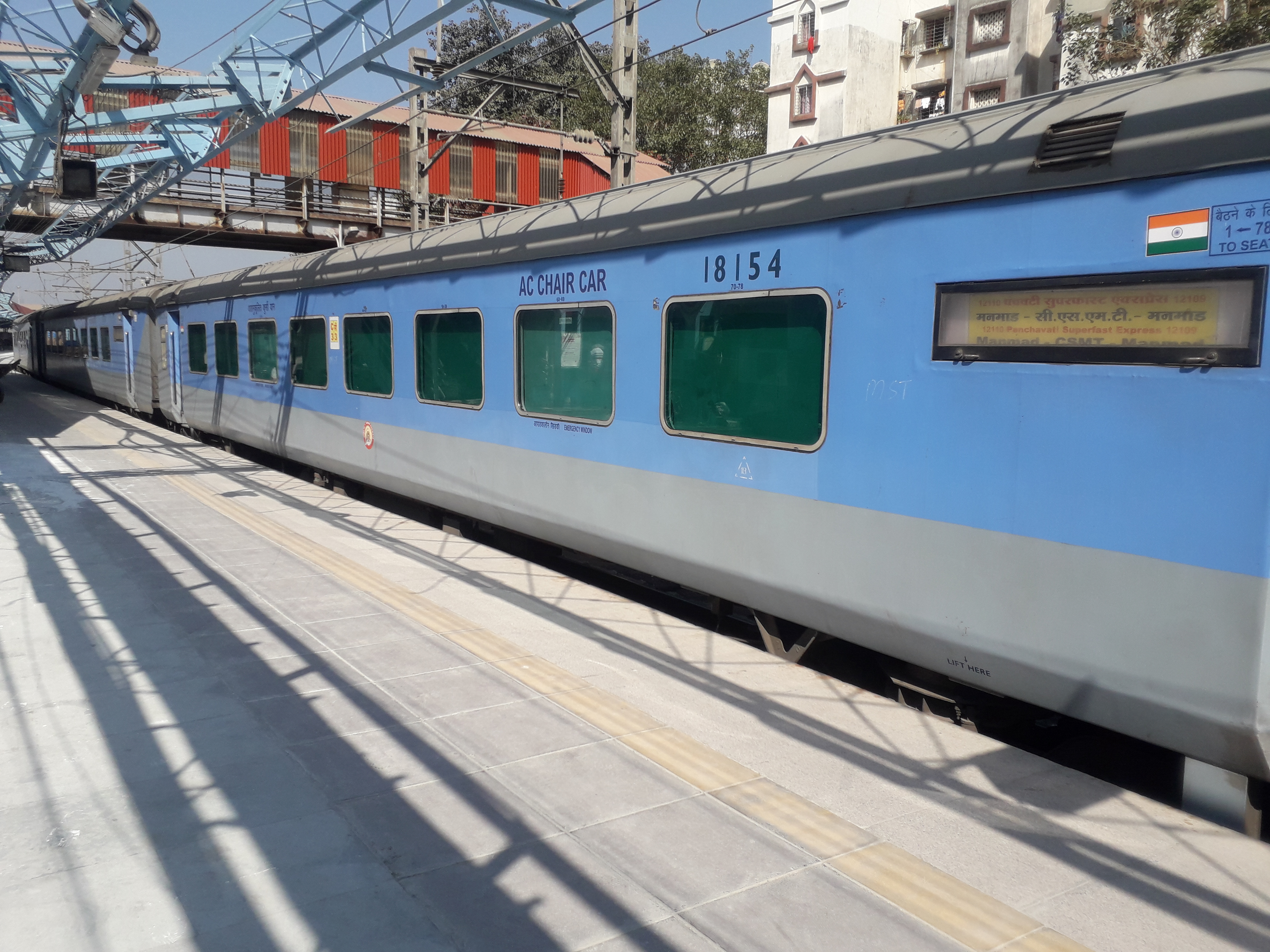
12109 Panchavati Express – AC Chair Car coach

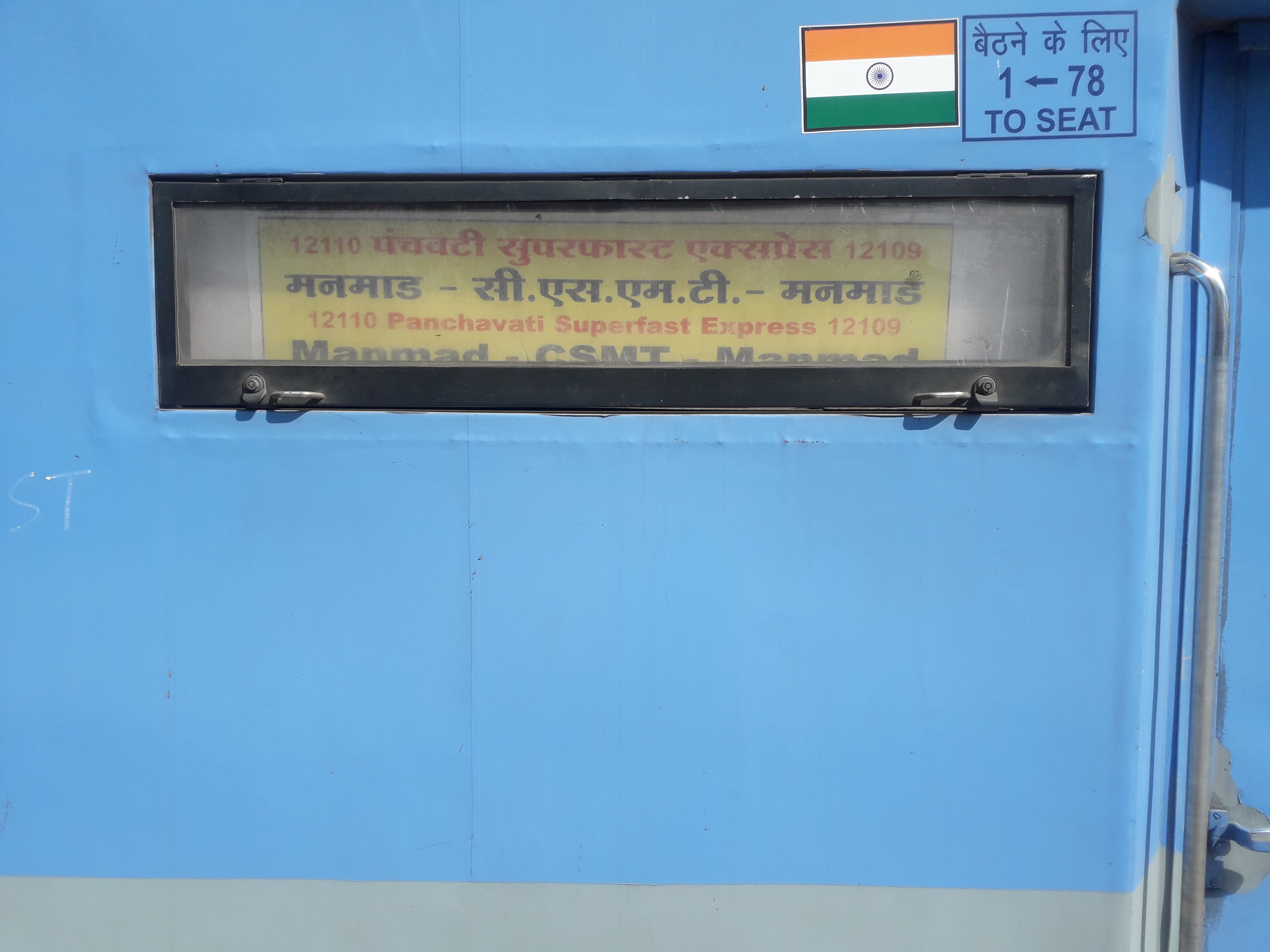
12109 Panchavati Express – AC Chair Car coach board

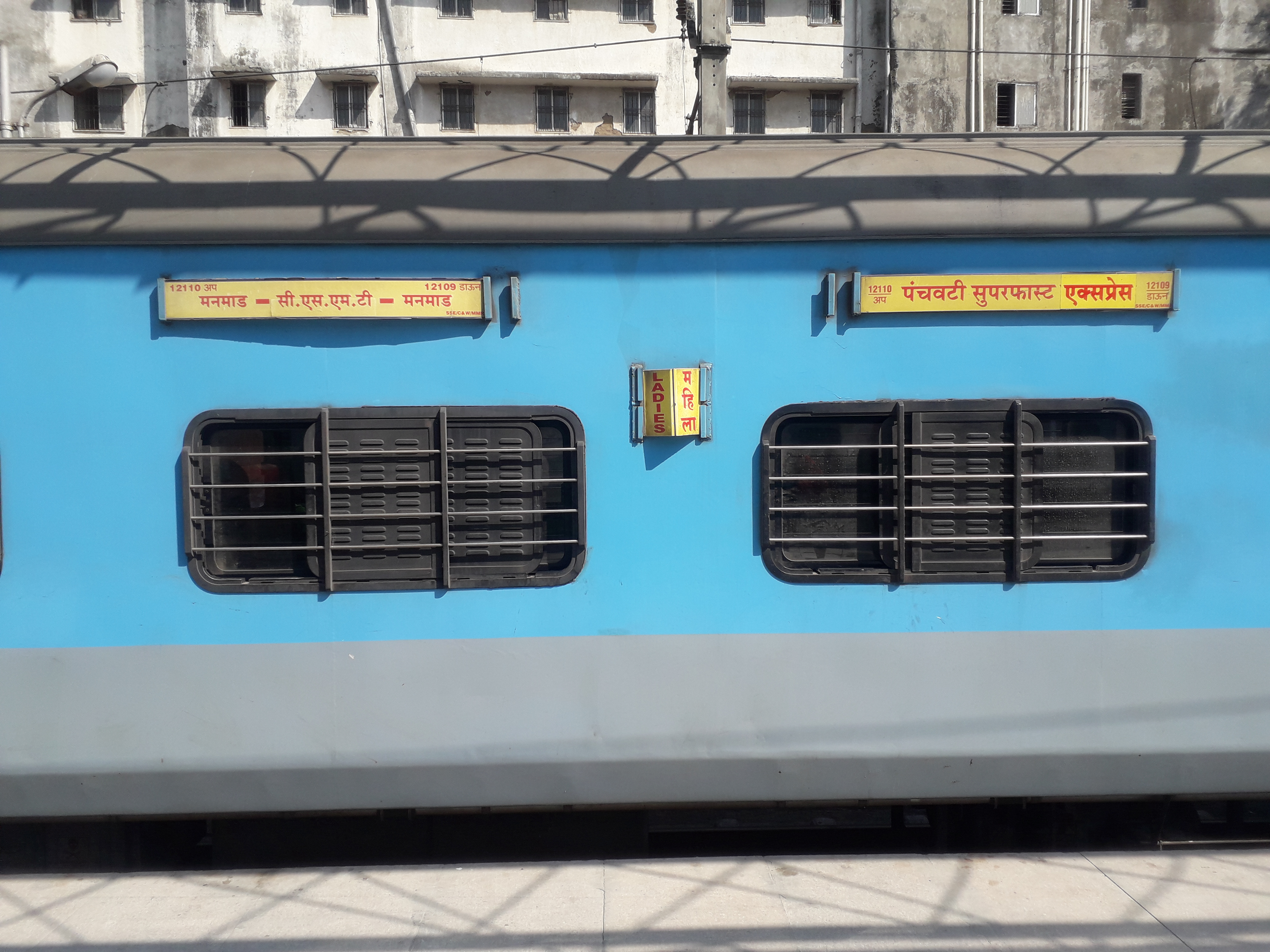
12109 Panchavati Express – 2nd Class seating (reserved for ladies) coach

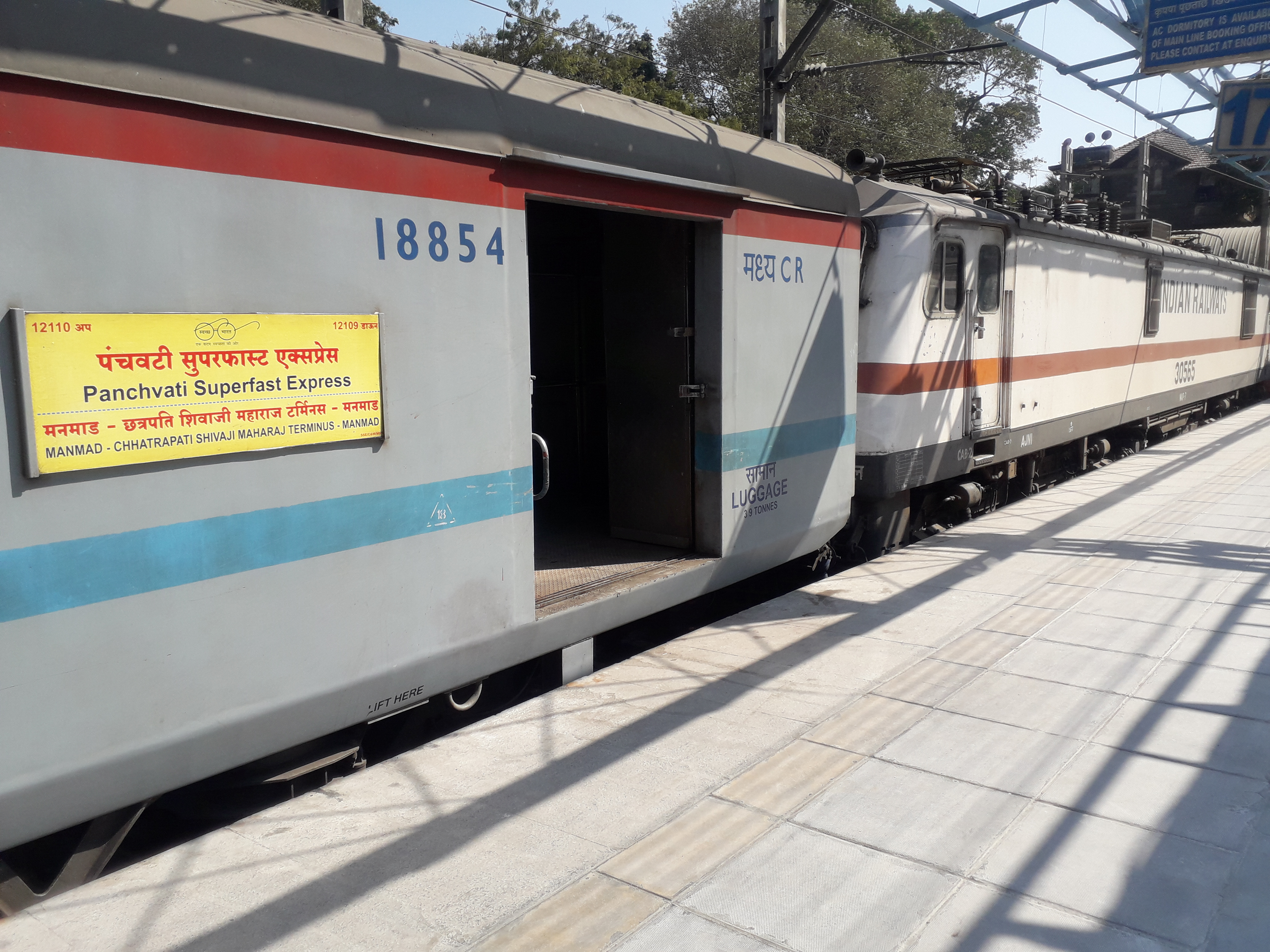
12110 Panchavati Express with Ajni-based WAP-7 locomotive

== See also ==
- Lokmanya Tilak Terminus–Manmad Godavari Express
- Hazur Sahib Nanded–Mumbai CST Rajya Rani Express
