= Nandur Madhmeshwar Bird Sanctuary =

Bird sanctuary in India

Nandur Madhameshwar Wildlife Sanctuary
- IUCN category IV (habitat/species management area)
- Interactive map of Nandur Madhameshwar Wildlife Sanctuary
- Area: 100.12 km^{2} (38.66 sq mi)
- Established: 1986
Designations
Ramsar Wetland
- Official name: Nandur Madhameshwar
- Designated: 27 Jan 2020
- Reference no.: 2410

Nandur Madhmeshwar Bird Sanctuary is located at Niphad Tehsil of Nashik District, known as the Bharatpur of Maharashtra.

It is designated as Ramsar site and it's a Maharashtra's first Ramsar site.

A stone pickup is constructed across river Godavari at Nandur Madhmeshwar. This resulted into the formation of rich environment for biological diversity. Many species of plants like Babul, Tamarind, Neem, Jamun, Vilayati, Maharukh, Pangara, Mango, Eucalyptus, are found here, also some aquatic plant species are available.

== Gallery ==
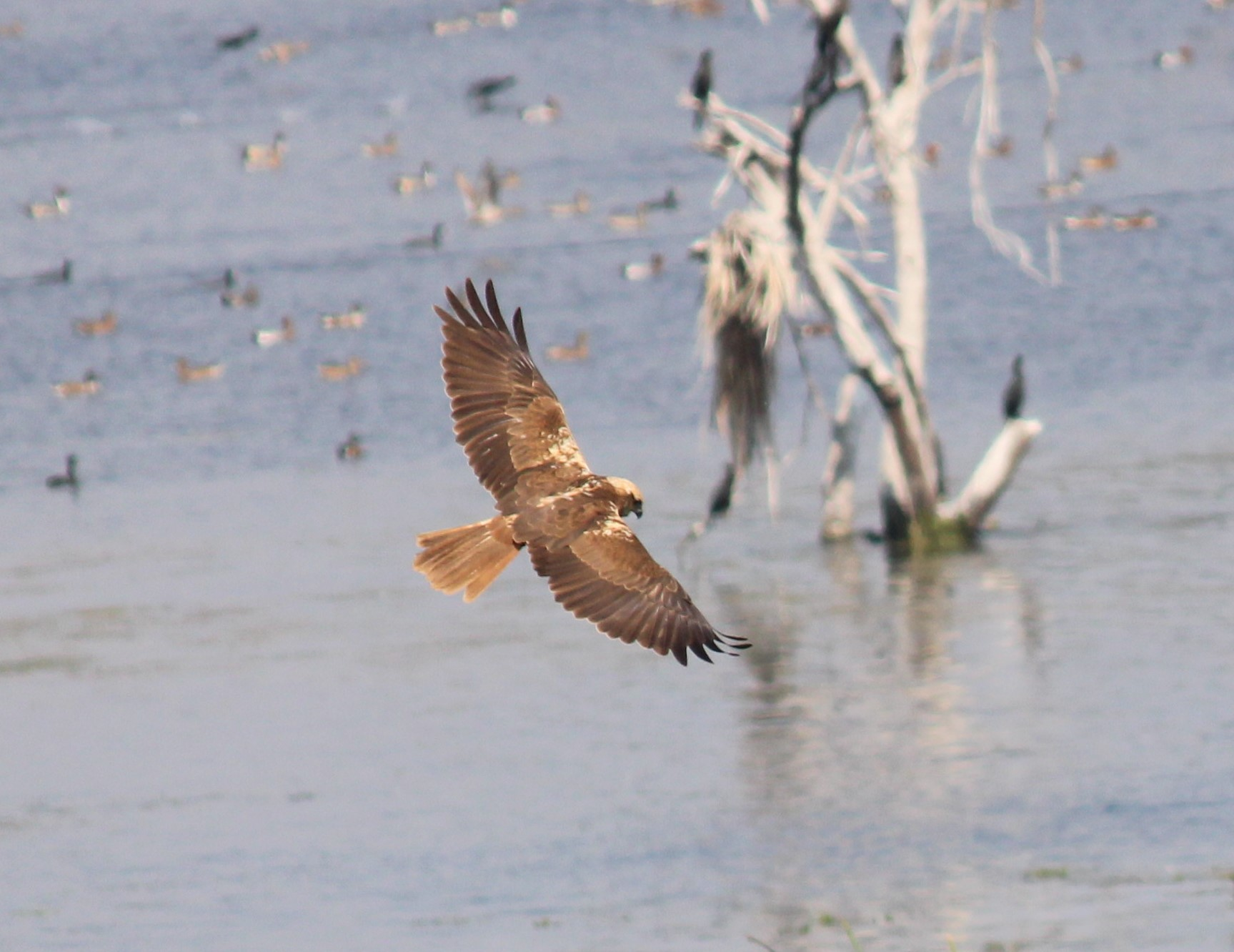
Marsh Harrier Female Hovering

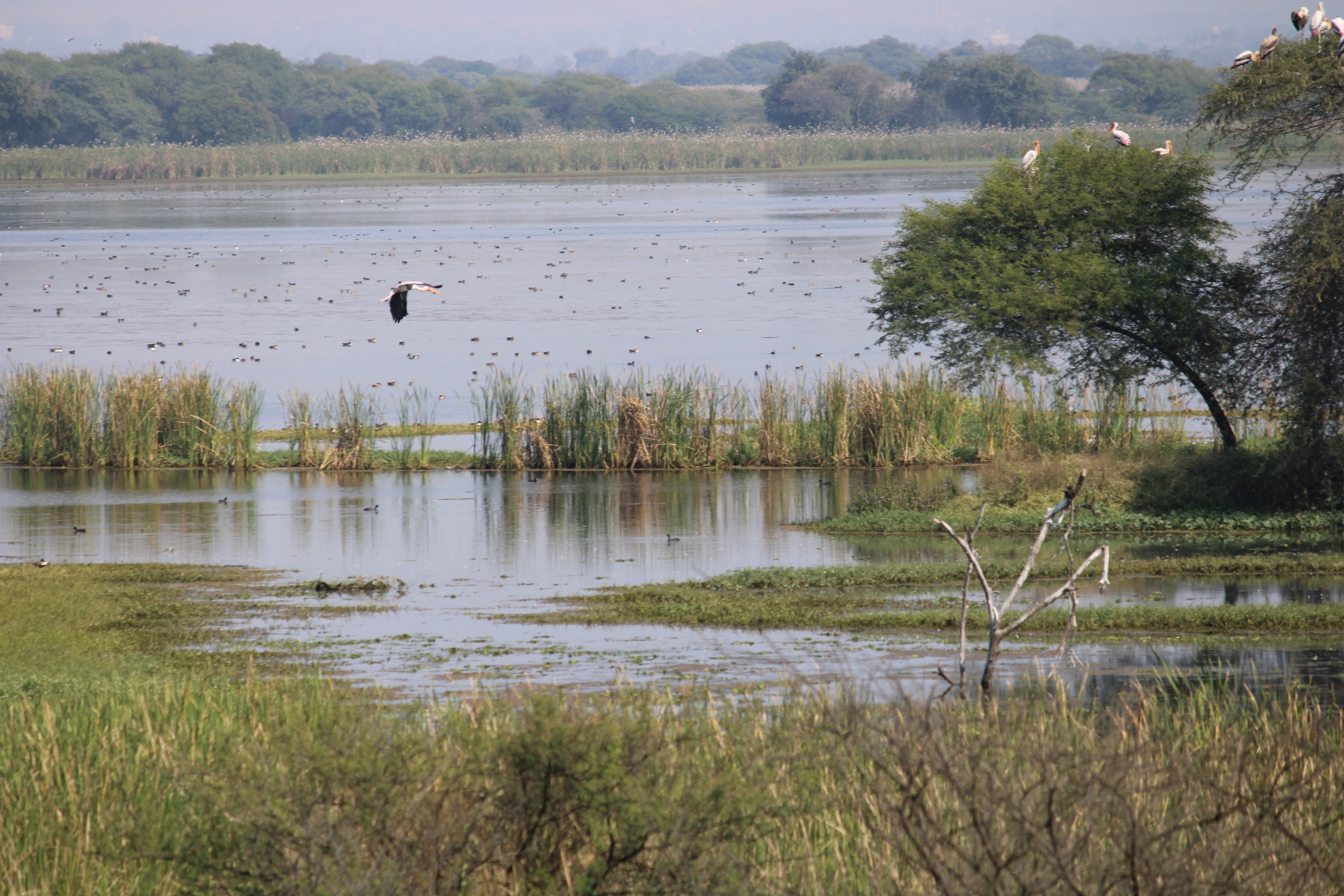
Wetland of Nandur Madhmeshwar Bird Sanctuary, India

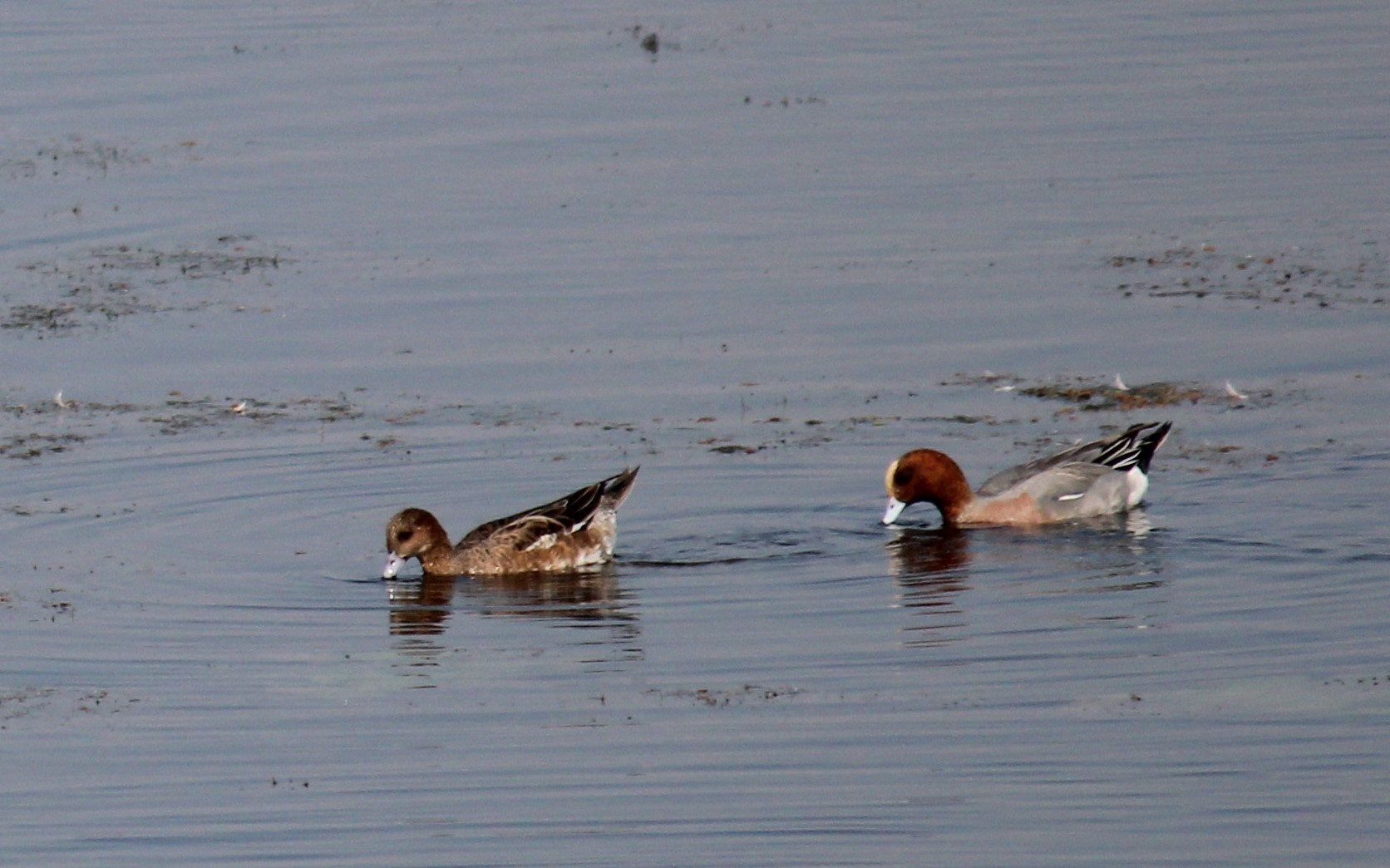
Eurasian Wigeon Pair

== See also ==
- List of lakes in India
- List of national parks of India
- Ramsar Convention
- Tiger reserves of Maharashtra
