= Anil Kadam =

Indian politician

Anil Sahebrao Kadam

Member of Legislative Assembly of Maharashtra
- In office 2009–2019
- Preceded by: Diliprao Shankarrao Bankar
- Succeeded by: Diliprao Shankarrao Bankar
- Constituency: Niphad

Personal details
- Party: Shiv Sena
- Website: http://www.anilkadam.in

Anil Kadam is an Indian politician, from Nashik district. He was a member of the 13th Maharashtra Legislative Assembly from Niphad Vidhan Sabha constituency as member of Shiv Sena. He has been elected to Vidhan Sabha for two consecutive terms in 2009 and 2014.

== Positions held ==
year	office
2000	Elected as deputy sarpanch of Ozar village in Nashik District
2007	Elected as member of Nashik Zilla Parishad
2007	Elected as chairman of Animal Husbandry department of Nashik Zilla Parishad
2009	Elected to Maharashtra Legislative Assembly (1st term)
2014	Re-Elected to Maharashtra Legislative Assembly (2nd term)
2015	Ashaskiya Vidheyake and tharav Committee (अशासकिय विधेयके व ठराव समिती) Pramukh Maharashtra Vidhan Mandal
2015	Elected as Director of Nashik District Central Co-operative Bank
2024	Master mind of Loksabha election in Dindori Loksabha constituency

== See also ==
- Dindori Lok Sabha constituency
