= Hazur Sahib Nanded–Mumbai CSMT Rajya Rani Express =

Train in India

Hazur Sahib Nanded–Mumbai Chhatrapati Shivaji Maharaj Terminus Rajya Rani Express

Overview
- Service type: Rajya Rani Express, Express
- First service: March 10, 2012; 14 years ago (up to Manmad); January 10, 2020; 6 years ago (extended to Hazur Sahib Nanded)
- Current operator: South Central Railways

Route
- Termini: Hazur Sahib Nanded (NED); Chhatrapati Shivaji Maharaj Terminus (CSMT)
- Stops: 16
- Distance travelled: 607 km (377 mi)
- Average journey time: 12 hours 10 minutes
- Service frequency: Daily
- Train number: 17611 / 17612

On-board services
- Classes: Sleeper class, AC 3 Sleeper, 2nd Class seating, General Unreserved
- Seating arrangements: Yes
- Sleeping arrangements: Yes
- Catering facilities: On-board catering
- Other facilities: Below the seats

Technical
- Rolling stock: ICF coach
- Track gauge: 1,676 mm (5 ft 6 in)
- Operating speed: 110 km/h (68 mph) maximum, 55.47 km/h (34 mph) average including halts

The 17611 / 17612 Hazur Sahib Nanded–Mumbai Chhatrapati Shivaji Maharaj Terminus Rajya Rani Express is an Express train of the Rajya Rani Express category belonging to Indian Railways – South Central Railway zone that runs between Hazur Sahib Nanded and Chhatrapati Shivaji Maharaj Terminus in India.

It operates as train number 17611 from Hazur Sahib Nanded to Chhatrapati Shivaji Maharaj Terminus and as train number 17612 in the reverse direction, serving the state of Maharashtra.

== Coaches ==
This train has 1 AC chair car, 10 (S1, S2, S3 up to S10), second class seating, 1 monthly seasonal ticket coach and 8+ sleeper class coach, general unreserved coaches. It has a pantry car.

As is customary with most train services in India, coach composition may be amended at the discretion of Indian Railways depending on demand.

== Service ==
The 17611 / 17612 Hazur Sahib Nanded–Mumbai Chhatrapati Shivaji Maharaj Terminus Rajya Rani Superfast Express covers the distance of 594 kilometres in 12 hours 00 mins (55.47 km/h) in both directions.

As the average speed of the train is above 55 km/h, as per Indian Railways rules, its fare includes a Superfast surcharge.

== Routing ==
The 17611/17612 Hazur Sahib Nanded–Mumbai Chhatrapati Shivaji Maharaj Terminus Rajya Rani Express runs from Hazur Sahib Nanded via Purna Junction, Parbhani Junction, Manwath Road, Jalna, Chhatrapati Sambhajinagar, Nagarsol, Manmad Junction, Nasik Road, Igatpuri, Kalyan Junction, Thane to Chhatrapati Shivaji Maharaj Terminus.

== Background ==
It was inaugurated on the route of Manmad to Lokmanya Tilak Terminus on 10 March 2012 with the rakes under the Central Railway zone and numbered 22101/02. Later on 12 October 2015, it was extended to Chhatrapati Shivaji Maharaj Terminus.

But there was a demand for increased connectivity between Nanded and Mumbai and thereafter this train was extended up to Hazur Sahib Nanded on 10 January 2020 and Rakes Shifted to South Central Railway zone and runs as Nanded Mumbai Rajyarani Express.

== Traction ==
Earlier was WDM-3A. As the route is fully electrified. A Kalyan-based WAP-7 electric locomotive hauls the train from Hazur Sahib Nanded to Chhatrapati Shivaji Maharaj Terminus, and vice versa.

== Timings ==
17611 Hazur Sahib Nanded–Mumbai Chhatrapati Shivaji Maharaj Terminus Rajya Rani Superfast Express leaves Hazur Sahib Nanded on a daily basis at 22:00 hrs IST and reaches Chhatrapati Shivaji Maharaj Terminus at 09:00 hrs IST the next day.

17612 Mumbai Chhatrapati Shivaji Maharaj Terminus–Hazur Sahib Nanded Rajya Rani Superfast Express leaves Chhatrapati Shivaji Maharaj Terminus on a daily basis at 19:00 hrs IST and reaches Hazur Sahib Nanded at 07:00 hrs IST the next day.

== Gallery ==
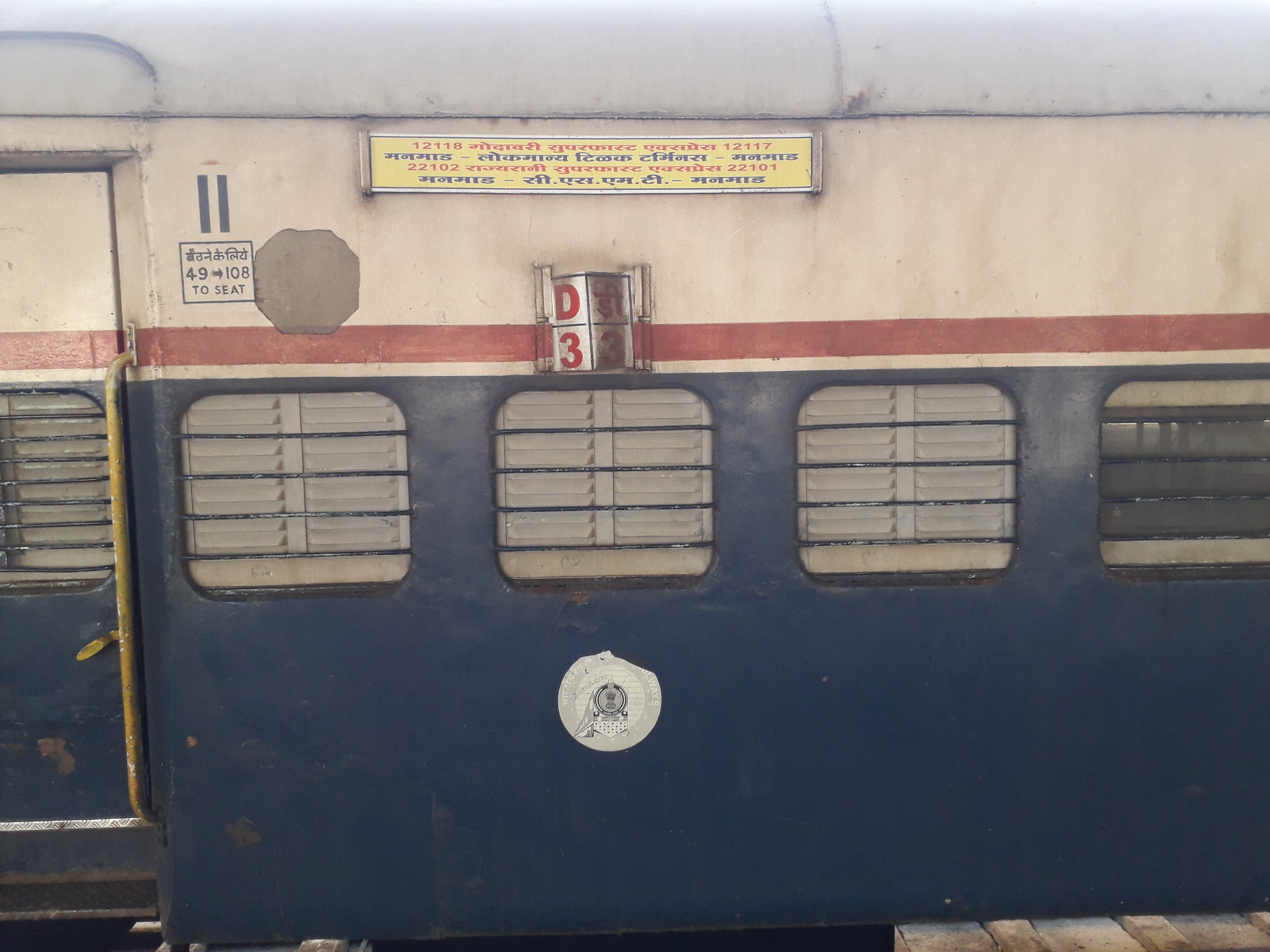
22102 Manmad Junction–Mumbai Chhatrapati Shivaji Maharaj Terminus Rajya Rani Superfast Express – 2nd Class seating coach

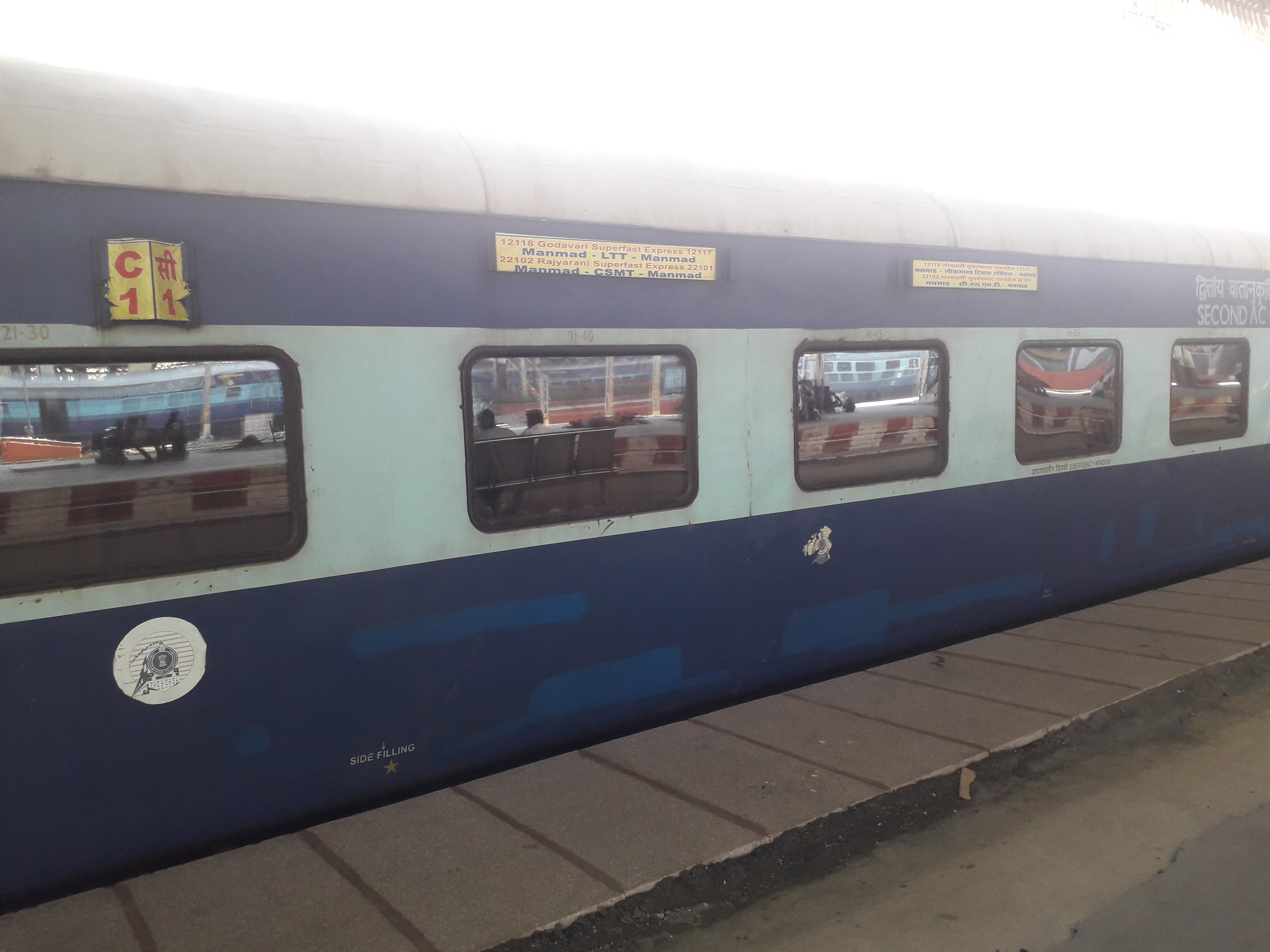
22102 Manmad Junction–Mumbai Chhatrapati Shivaji Maharaj Terminus Rajya Rani Superfast Express – AC Chair Car coach

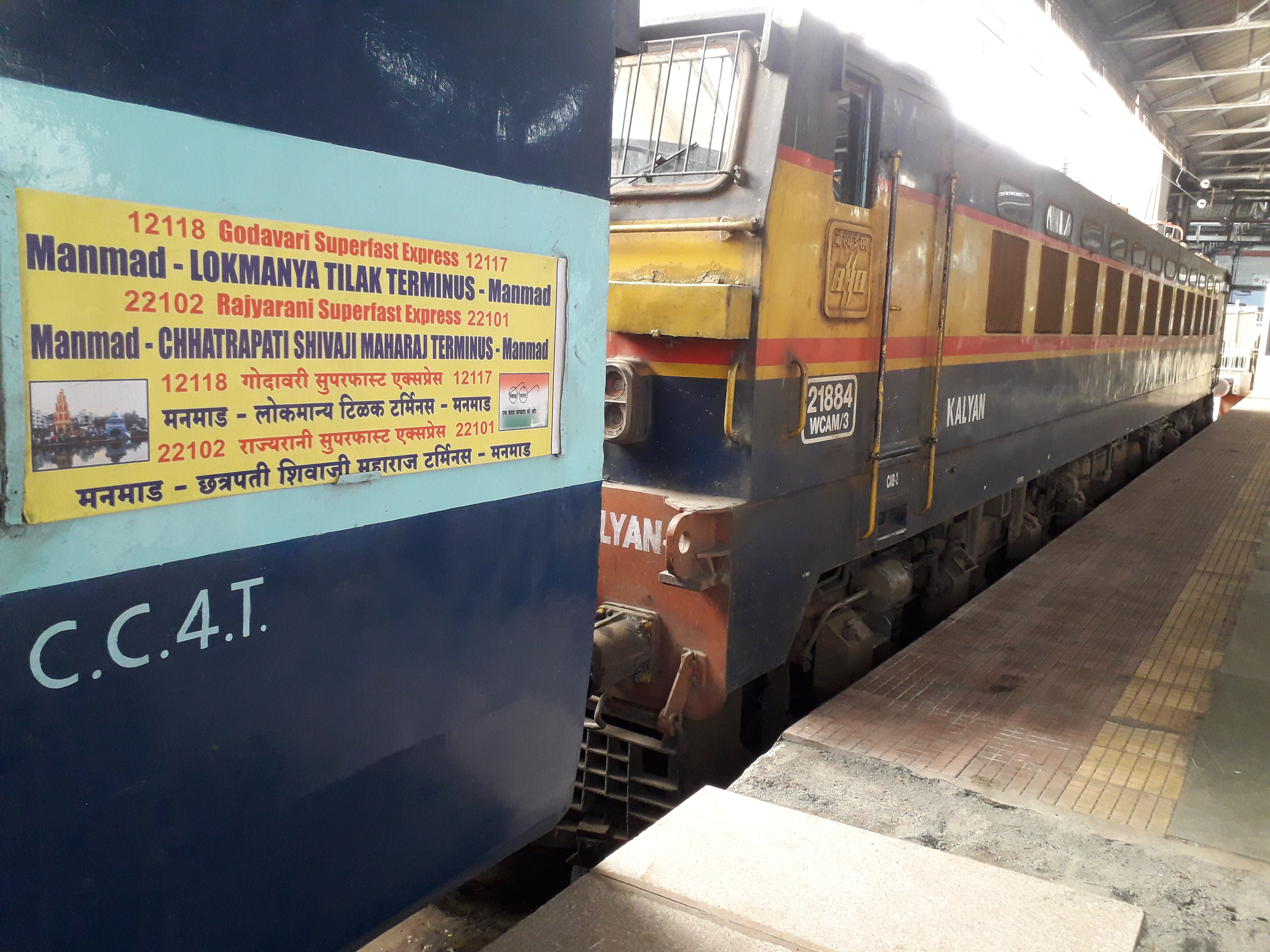
22102 Manmad Junction–Mumbai Chhatrapati Shivaji Maharaj Terminus Rajya Rani Superfast Express with WCAM 3 locomotive

== See also ==
- Lokmanya Tilak Terminus–Manmad Godavari Express
- Panchvati Express
