= Khaede =

Village in Maharashtra, India

Khede Ugaon Khede
- village
- Location in Maharashtra, India Khede (India)
- Coordinates: 20.0843°N 74.1167°E
- Country: India
- State: Maharashtra
- District: Nashik
- Taluka: Niphad

Area
  - Total: 8.70 km^{2} (3.36 sq mi)

Population (2011)
  - Total: 3,055
  - Density: 351/km^{2} (909/sq mi)

Languages
  - Official: Marathi
- Time zone: UTC+5:30 (IST)
- PIN: 422304
- Vehicle registration: MH-
- Nearest city: Niphad, Nashik
- Literacy: 85.67% (2011)
- Lok Sabha constituency: Dindori
- Vidhan Sabha constituency: Niphad

Khede (also spelled Khaede; locally Mauje Khede) is a village in Niphad taluka of the Nashik district in the Indian state of Maharashtra. The village lies near the Vinita (local river) and is noted locally for the Shree Hinglaj Devi temple located in the settlement of Ugaon–Khede.

== Geography ==
Khede is located in the Niphad taluka of Nashik district. The village covers an area of approximately 870 hectares (8.70 km²) and is connected by local roads to neighbouring settlements; Nashik city is the nearest major urban centre. Coordinates: 20.0843°N 74.1167°E.

== Demographics ==
According to the 2011 Census of India, Khede had a population of 3,055 in 540 households, comprising 1,695 males and 1,360 females (sex ratio 802). Children (age 0–6) numbered 347 (11.36% of the population). The village literacy rate in 2011 was 85.67% — male literacy 92.62% and female literacy 77.16%. Scheduled Castes and Scheduled Tribes constituted notable minorities of the population (11.3% SC; 10.8% ST).

== Economy ==
The local economy is primarily agricultural. Crops reported in the region include jowar (sorghum), bajra (millet), onion, sugarcane, cotton, pulses and wheat. Farming relies on a combination of rainfall and local water sources; groundwater and small river irrigation serve as important inputs.

== Religion and culture ==
Khede is known locally for a shrine dedicated to Hinglaj Devi (Hinglaj Mata). The Hinglaj Mata Temple in Ugaon–Khede attracts devotees from the surrounding area, particularly during festival periods; local sources and regional press note its importance to the community and the shrine's association with the wider Hinglaj tradition (whose principal historic shrine is in present-day Balochistan, Pakistan).

== Infrastructure and transport ==
As per the District Census Handbook and village directory (2011), Khede has basic educational facilities (primary and secondary schools) and limited health and commercial infrastructure typical of rural settlements in the taluka. Drinking water is provided through village-level sources; road connectivity is by local and state roads. For major medical, higher-education and commercial services residents generally travel to Niphad or Nashik.

Khede does not have a railway station; the nearest major railheads and bus services are in towns of Niphad and Lasalgaon. The village is served by state and rural bus routes connecting it to neighbouring towns.
