= Bhendali =

Village in Maharashtra, India

- Village
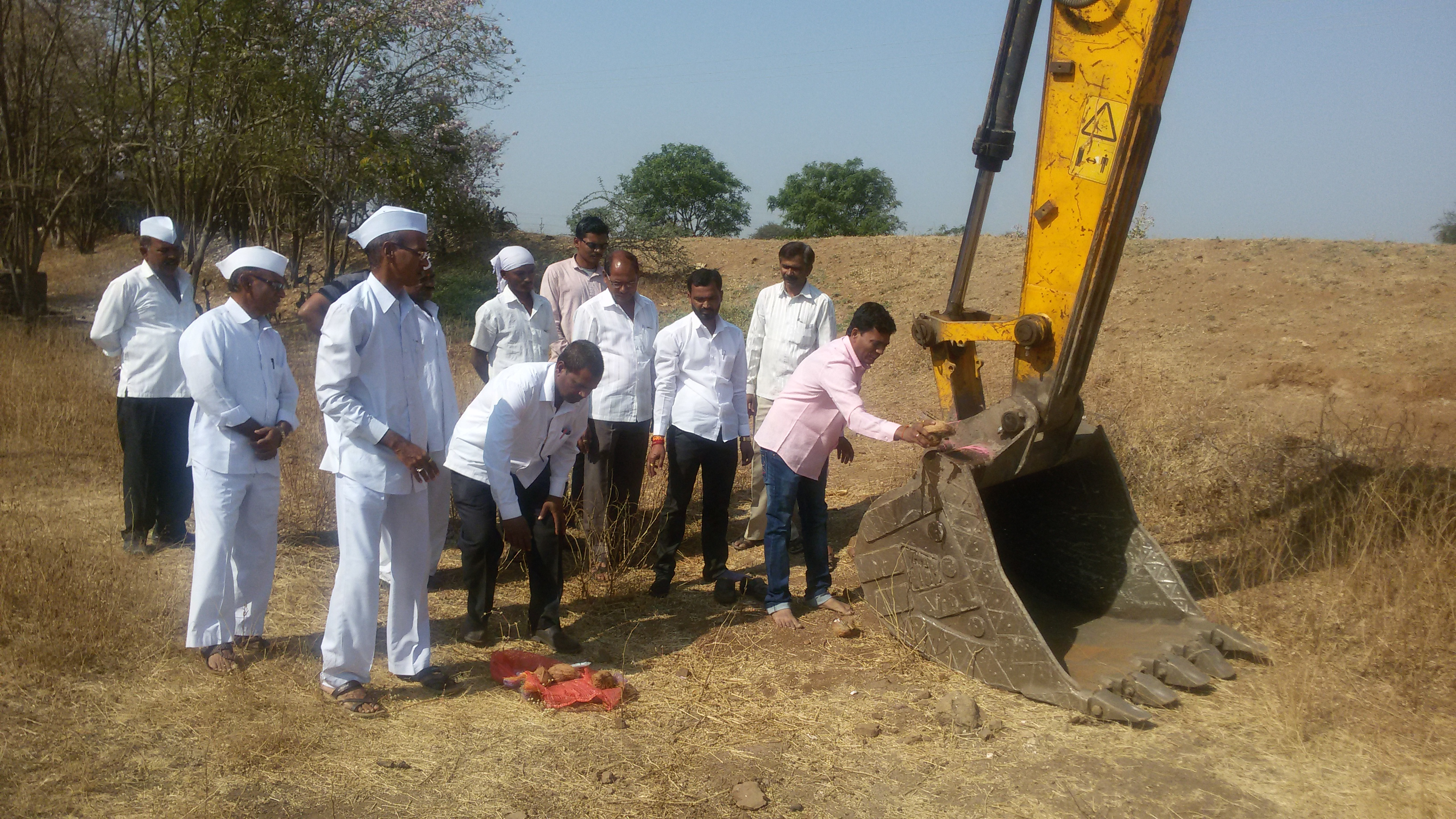
- Interactive map of Bhendali
- Country: India
- State: Maharashtra
- District: Nashik
- Taluka: Niphad

Bhendali village is situated in Niphad Taluka of Nashik district, Maharashtra State, India.

== Statistics ==
Bhendali is a village located in the Niphad taluka of Nashik district in the Indian state of Maharashtra. It is situated approximately 31 km east of Nashik, 14 km from Niphad, and about 195 km from Mumbai, the state capital.

The village has the postal code 422210. Its post office and police station are located in Saykheda.

Nearby villages include Mahajanpur (1 km), Ramnagar (4 km), Songaon (5 km), Bhuse (5 km), and Pimpalgaon Nipani (6 km). Bhendali is bordered by Sinnar to the south, Nashik to the west, Chandwad to the north, and Kopargaon to the east.

Bhendali is administered by a Gram Panchayat, which was established on 25 April 2000. The village covers a total area of 662.83 hectares, of which 615.09 hectares are used for agriculture, 27.97 hectares are classified as vacant land, and the remaining area consists of grazing land, roads, water bodies, and other public-use land.

=== Demographics ===
According to the 2011 Census of India, Bhendali had a population of 2,247 residents, comprising 1,183 males and 1,064 females.

Marathi and Urdu are the primary languages spoken in the village.

=== Connectivity ===
- Public bus service is available within the village.
- Private bus services are available within a distance of 5–10 km.
- The nearest railway stations are located within approximately 14 km, including Kherwadi, Niphad, and Sukene.

=== Education ===
The village has the following educational institutions:

- Anu Madhyamik Vidyalaya, Bhendali
- Zilla Parishad School No. 1, Bhendali
- Zilla Parishad School No. 2, Bhendali

=== Local Governance ===
The following individuals have served as Sarpanch of the Gram Panchayat:

- Balasaheb Sadashiv Khalkar (25 October 2000 – 12 August 2002)
- Sudhakar Pandharinath Khalkar (13 August 2002 – 24 October 2005)
- Deepak Bhaskar Kamankar (25 October 2005 – 21 October 2010)
- Usha Sharad Khalkar (22 October 2010 – 19 October 2015)
- Gorakh Sampat Khalkar (20 October 2015 – September 2020)
- Bhartitai Babanrao Khalkar
