= Niphad railway station =

Railway Station in Maharashtra, India

Niphad
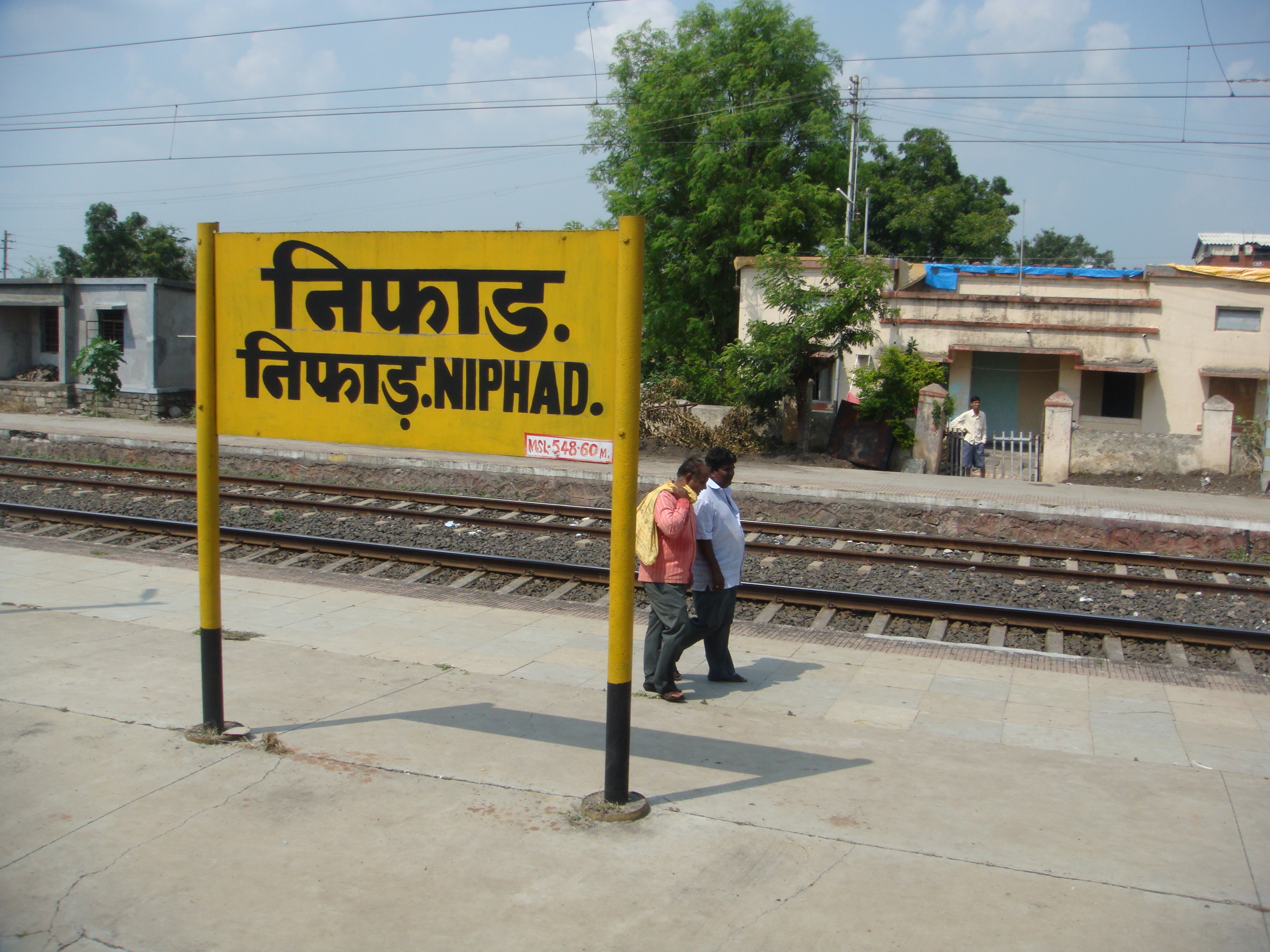

General information
- Location: Niphad; India
- Coordinates: 20.0971°N 74.0802°E
- Elevation: 548.600 metres (1,799.87 ft)
- System: Indian Railways station
- Operator: Bhusaval
- Platforms: 3

Construction
- Structure type: Standard (on-ground station)

Other information
- Station code: NR
- Fare zone: Central Railway
Location

Niphad railway station is a railway station in the state of Maharashtra, India, on the Central Railway network, 32 km from Nasik Road. It is a small and not very busy station.

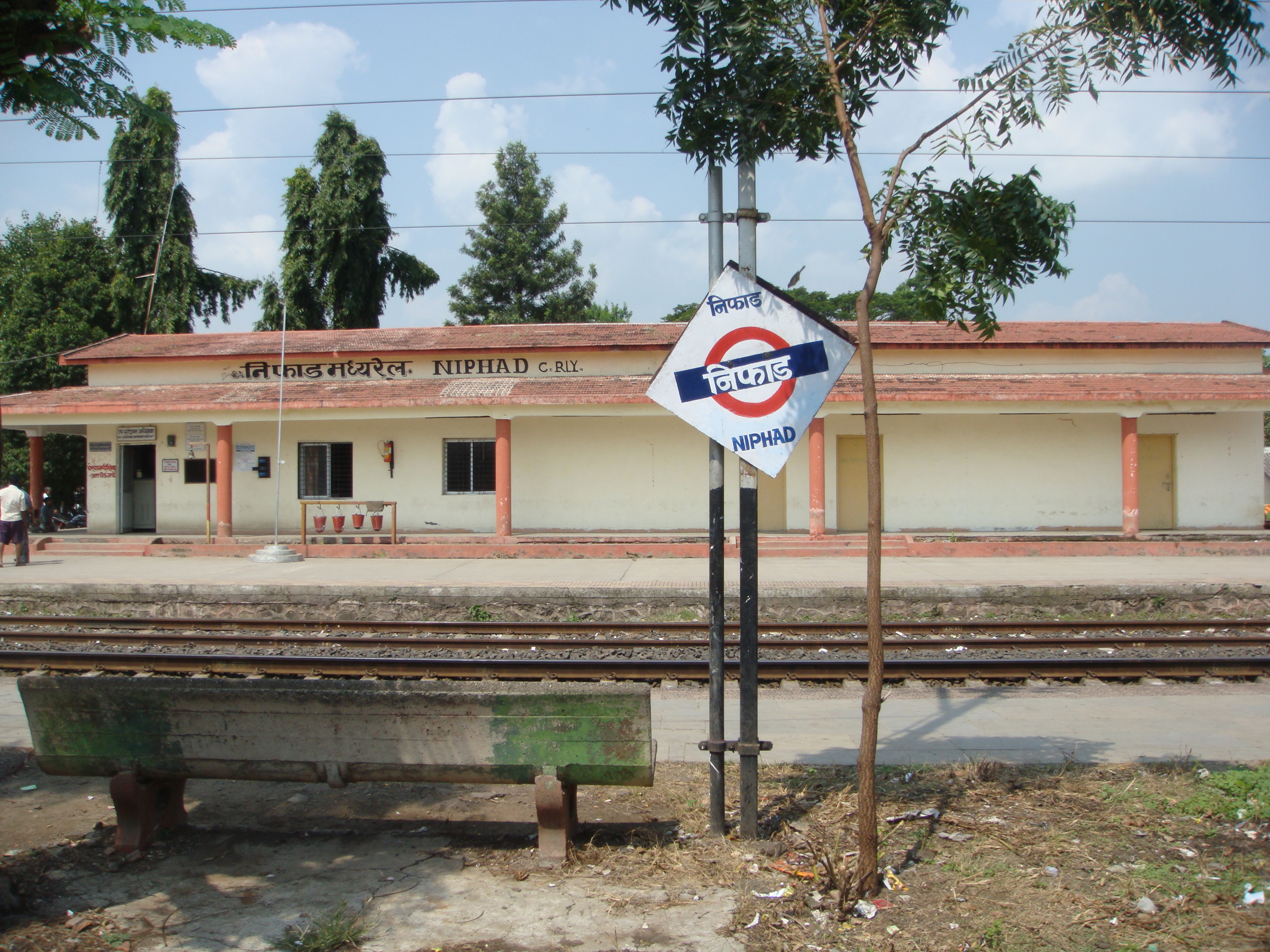
Niphad platformboard

== Important trains ==
Some of the important trains that pass through Niphad are:

- 13201/02 Rajendranagar Express
- 12139/40 Sewagram Express
- 12117/18 Lokmanya Tilak Terminus–Manmad Godavari Express
