= Lokmanya Tilak Terminus–Manmad Godavari Express =

Train in India

Mumbai LTT-Manmad Godavari Express
Overview
- Service type: Superfast
- Locale: Maharashtra
- Current operator: Central Railway

Route
- Termini: Manmad (MMR); Mumbai LTT (LTT)
- Stops: 8
- Distance travelled: 240 km (149 mi)
- Average journey time: 4 hours 25 minutes
- Service frequency: Daily
- Train number: 12117 / 12118

On-board services
- Classes: AC Chair Car, Second Class Seating, General Unreserved
- Seating arrangements: Yes
- Sleeping arrangements: No
- Auto-rack arrangements: Overhead racks
- Catering facilities: On-board catering
- Observation facilities: Large windows
- Baggage facilities: Available
- Other facilities: Below the seats

Technical
- Rolling stock: LHB coach
- Track gauge: 1,676 mm (5 ft 6 in)
- Operating speed: 55 km/h (34 mph) average including halts.

The 12117 / 12118 Mumbai LTT-Manmad Godavari Express is a Superfast train belonging to Indian Railways that runs between Manmad Junction and Lokmanya Tilak Terminus in India.

== Coaches ==
Godavari Superfast Express presently has 1 AC Chair Car, 3 2nd Class seating & 14 General Unreserved coaches.

== Service ==
The 12118/12117 Godavari Superfast Express covers the distance of 245 kilometres in 4 hours 25 mins (55.47 km/h) in both directions. As the average speed of the train is above 55 km/h, as per Indian Railways rules, its fare includes a Superfast surcharge.

== Traction ==
It is hauled from end to end by a Kalyan Loco Shed based WCAM-2P electric locomotive.

== Gallery ==
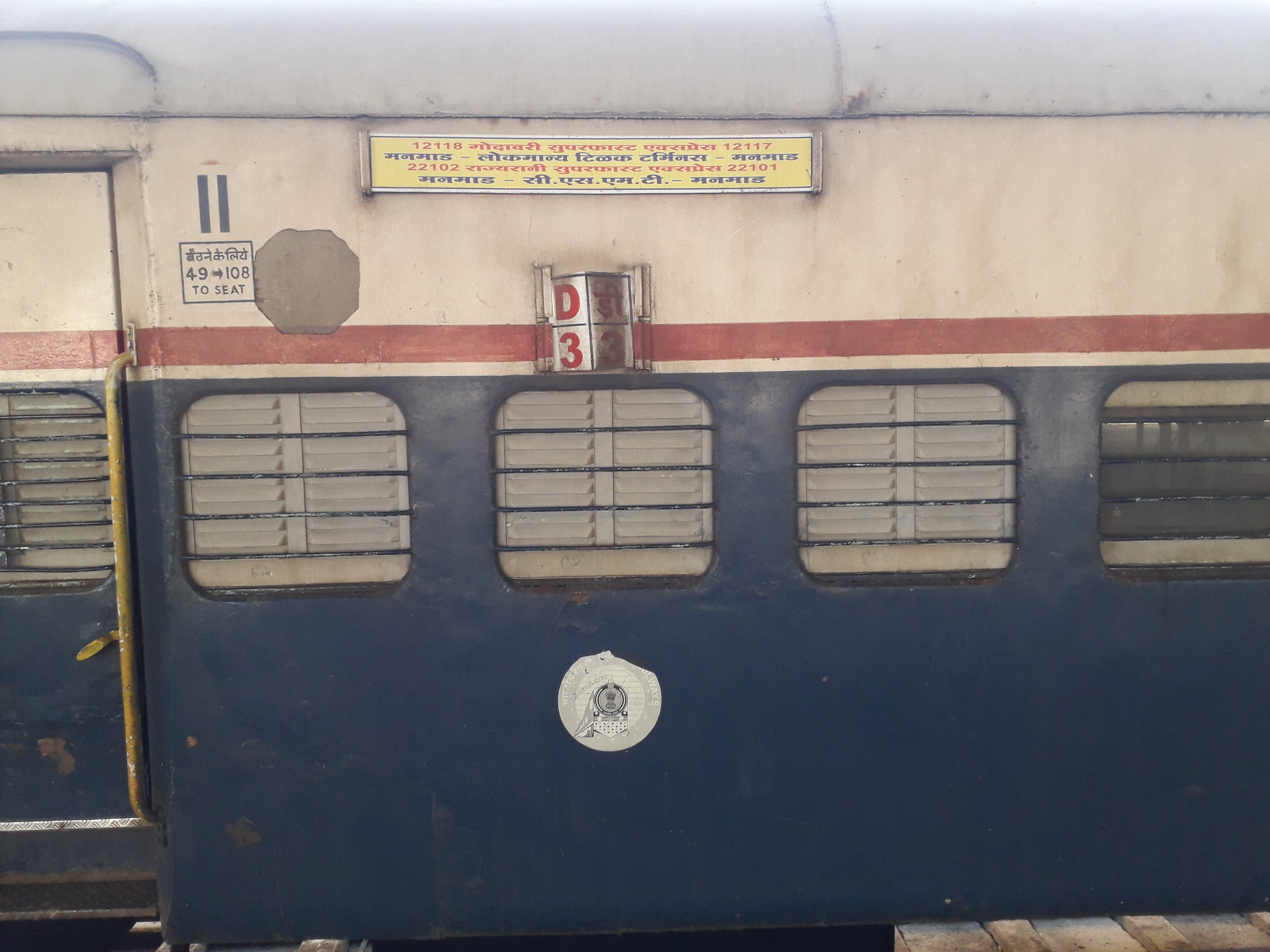
12118 Manmad–Lokmanya Tilak Terminus Godavari Superfast Express – 2nd Class seating coach

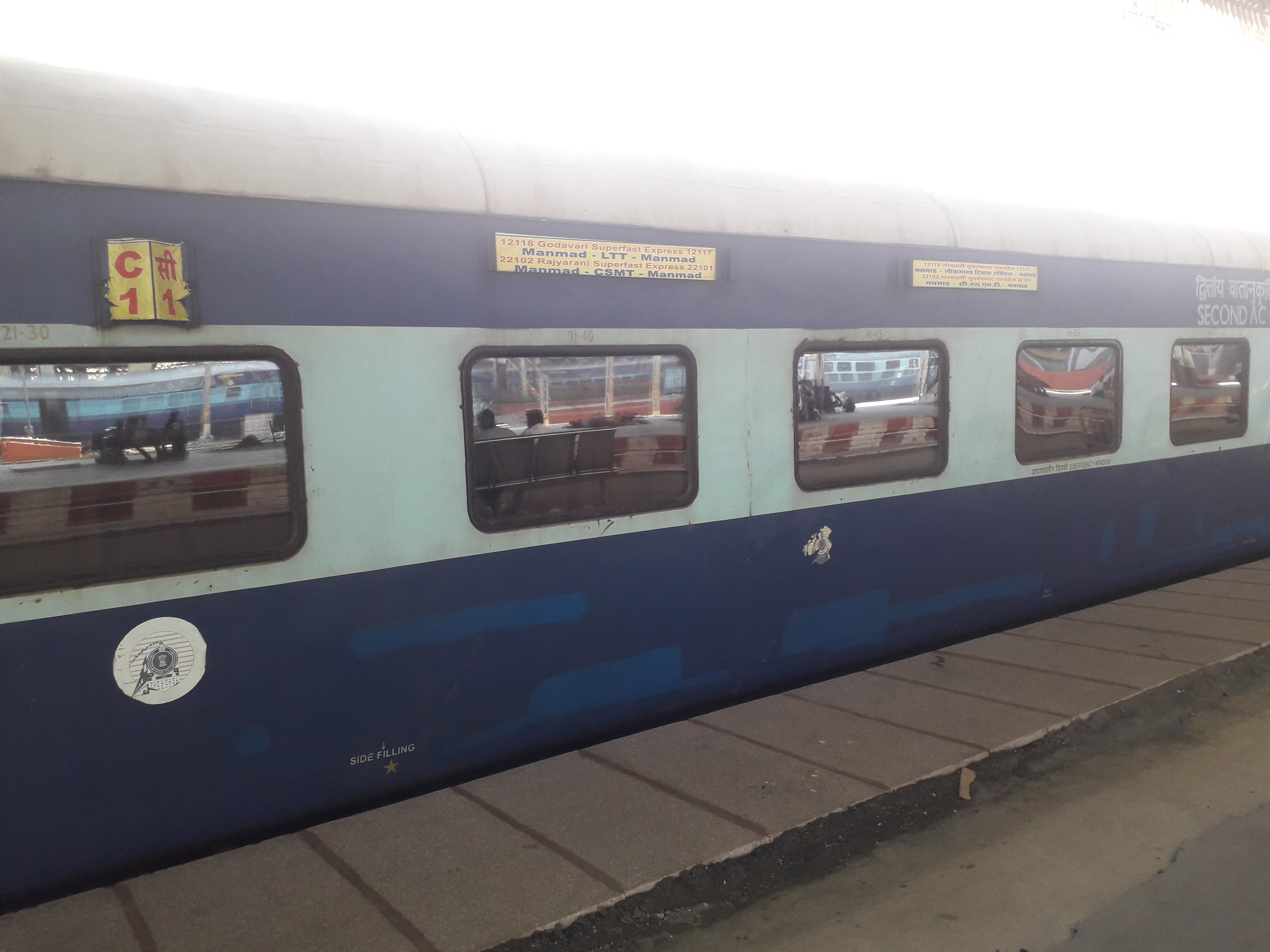
12118 Manmad–Lokmanya Tilak Terminus Godavari Superfast Express – AC Chair Car coach

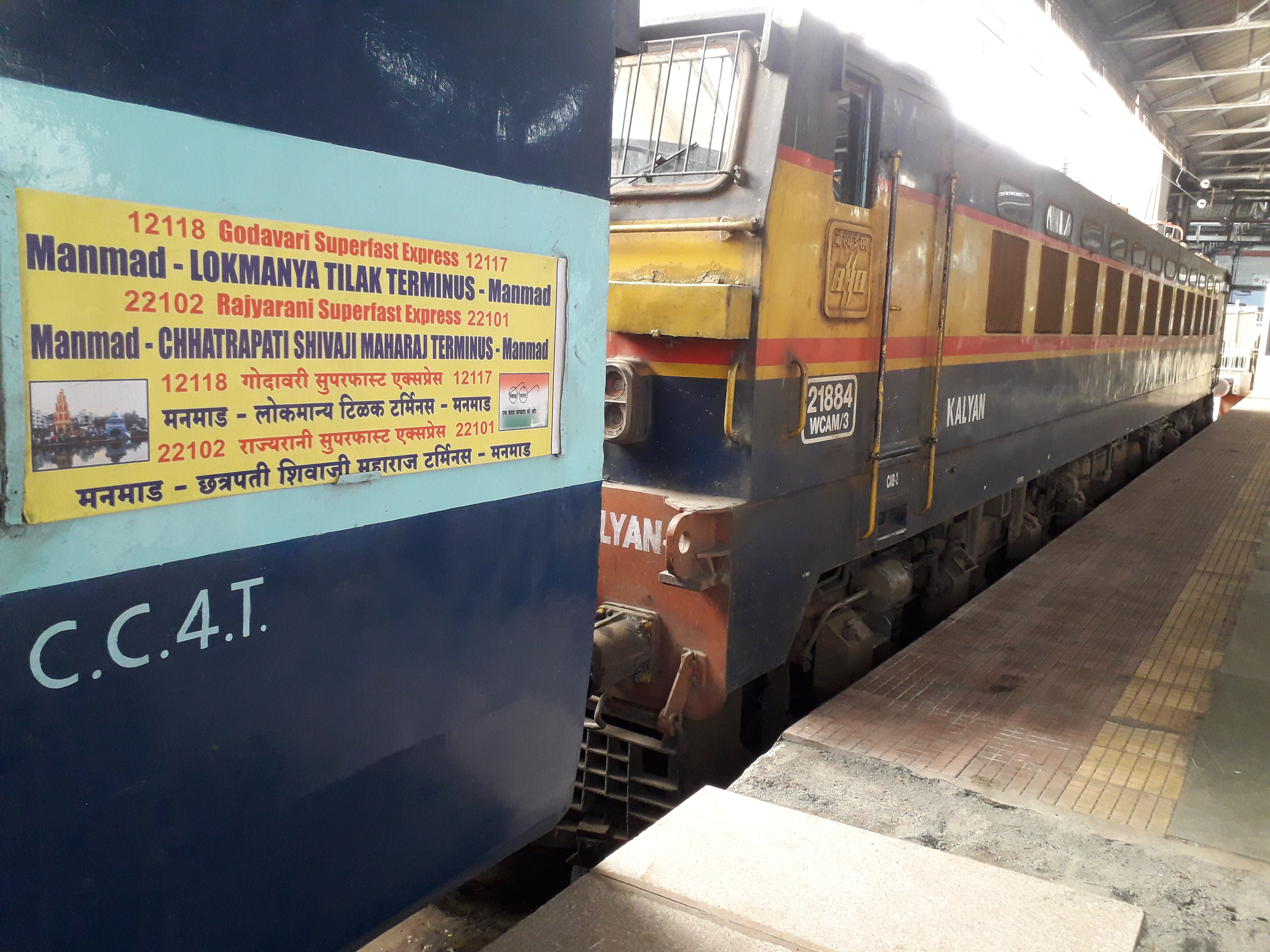
12118 Manmad–Lokmanya Tilak Terminus Godavari Superfast Express with WCAM-3 locomotive

== Timetable ==
- 12118 Godavari Superfast Express leaves Manmad Junction every day at 08:35 hrs IST and reaches Chhatrapati Shivaji Maharaj Terminus at 13:28 hrs IST the same day.
- 12117 Godavari Superfast Express leaves Chhatrapati Shivaji Maharaj Terminus every day at 15:45 hrs IST and reaches Manmad Junction at 20:28 hrs IST the same day.

== See also ==
- Panchvati Express
- Manmad Mumbai CST Rajya Rani Express
