= Tiger reserves of Maharashtra =

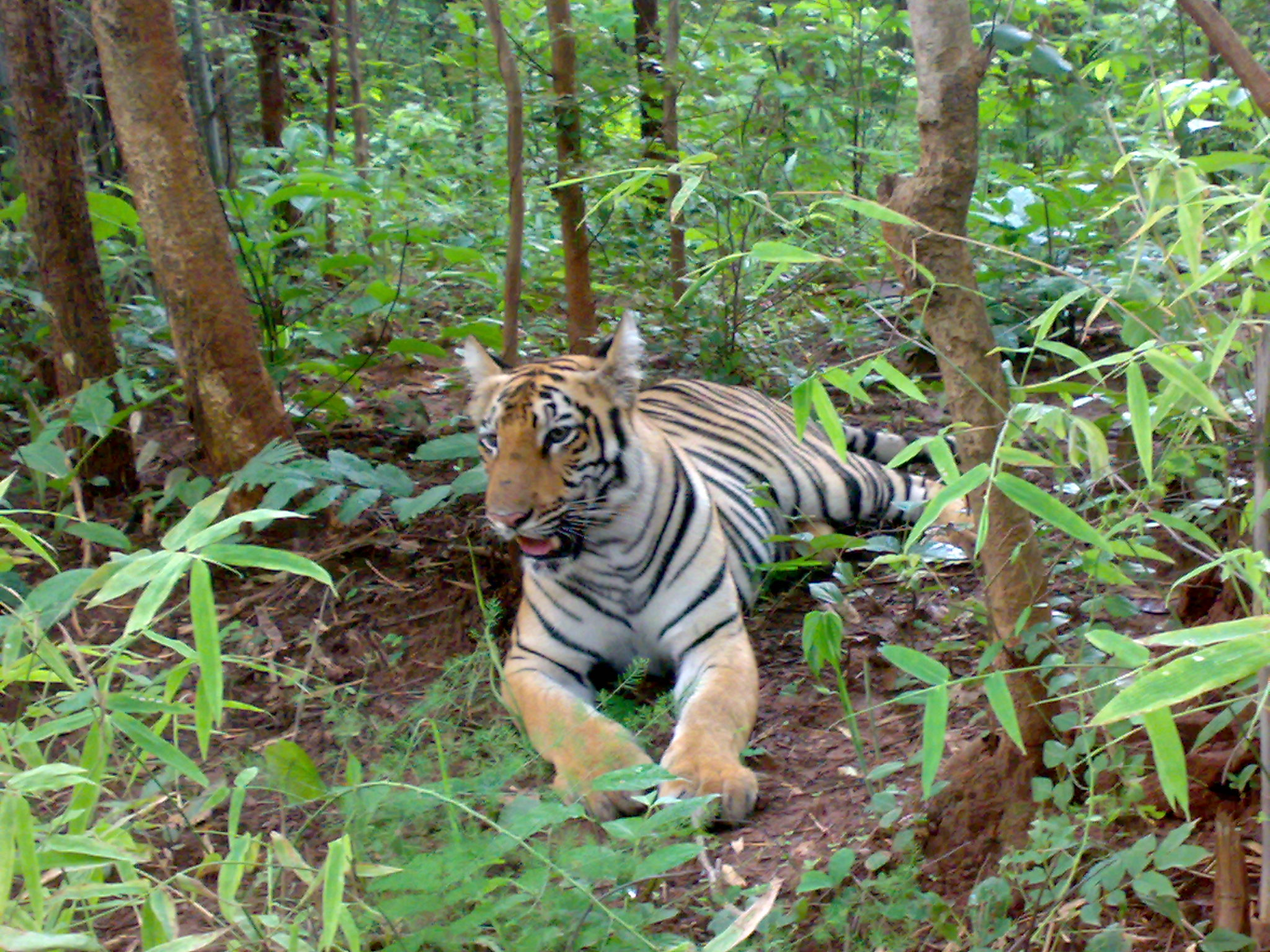
Tadoba Andhari Tiger Reserve, Maharashtra

Maharashtra provides legal protection to its tiger population through six dedicated tiger reserves under the precincts of the National Tiger Conservation Authority. under the initiative Project Tiger. These reserves cumulatively cover an estimated area of 9,113 km^{2} which is about 3% of the total state area.

Citing the presence of tigers in two wild-life sanctuaries, environmentalists had put forth a proposal to declare Umred Karhandla Wildlife Sanctuary and Tipeshwar Wildlife Sanctuary as tiger reserves. This would result in creation of a tiger corridor for migration of tigers between different reserves to encourage genetic dispersion. As of October 2016, this proposal has been rejected.

== History ==
Tiger reserves came to be created under the former Prime Minister Indira Gandhi's flagship program, Project Tiger. It envisioned to creating a safe haven for tigers to flourish and receive legal protection against poachers. Melghat is among the first nine tiger reserves to be declared in 1973–74, with Gugamal National Park as its core zone along with the adjoining Melghat Wildlife Sanctuary and deciduous rich forest zones. Subsequently, over the years, five additional reserves were created. Tadoba National Park, formed in 1955, is one of the oldest national parks. In 1993, its merger with Andhari Wildlife Sanctuary led to the creation of Tadobo Andhari Tiger Reserve.

Tiger Census

As of 2022, Maharashtra has the fifth-largest tiger population among all Indian states.

The tiger population in the state has shown a consistent rise:

2006: 103 tigers

2010: 169 tigers

2015: 190 tigers (a 12% increase from 2010)

2018: 312 tigers

2022: 444 tigers

The latest census, conducted as part of the All India Tiger Estimation Report 2022, highlights the effectiveness of conservation efforts in the state. Maharashtra's tiger reserves, such as Tadoba-Andhari, Melghat, Pench, Bor, Navegaon-Nagzira, and Sahyadri, have played a crucial role in this growth.

== List of tiger reserves ==
Tiger Reserve	Year declared	Core Area (km^{2})	Buffer Area (km^{2})	Total Area (km^{2})
Melghat	1974	1,500	1,268	2,768
Tadoba	1993	626	1,102	1,728
Pench	1999	257.23	483.96	741.19
Sahyadri	2007	600	565	1,166
Nawegaon-Nagzira	2013	654	1241	1895
Bor	2014	138	678	816
Total		3775	5338	9113

The numbers of the tigers in each of the tiger reserves are not mentioned. These can be found at bigcatsindia.com.

== See also ==
- Pranhita Wildlife Sanctuary
