= Niphad =

- Town
- Location in Maharashtra, India
- Coordinates: 20.0833°N 73.80°E
- Country: India
- State: Maharashtra
- Division: Nashik
- District: Nashik

Government
  - Type: Subdivision
  - Body: Sub-Divisional Office, P.W.D. Sub-Division, Additional District Court
  - MLA: Diliprao Shankarrao Bankar
- Elevation: 569 m (1,867 ft)

Population (2011)
  - Total: 16,322
- Time zone: UTC+5:30 (IST)
- PIN: 422303
- Telephone code: 02550
- Vehicle registration: MH 15
- official Language: Marathi

Niphad is the name both of the town and the Taluka headquartered there. It is within the Nashik District of Maharashtra, India. The Marathi name signifies "a place without mountains", and indeed the taluka's topography is fairly level, with hardly any hills. It is served by Niphad railway station. Niphad's latitude and longitude coordinates are 20°5′0″N 74°7′0″E. Located northeast of Nashik city, the Taluka borders Sinnar, Nashik, Dindori, Chandwad, and Yeola Talukas and Ahmednagar District, and has no direct access to the sea. The Niphad Sub-Division is composed of Niphad, Sinnar and Yeola Talukas.Home to the wine industry and being part of Wine Capital India. Niphad accounts to one third of total winaries in District of Nashik primarily at MIDC(Vinchur). Amongst which "Nipha" is one of the primary boutique winary which gets its name from the name of the town and is also linked with mountain peak in Antarctica with the same name "Nipha"

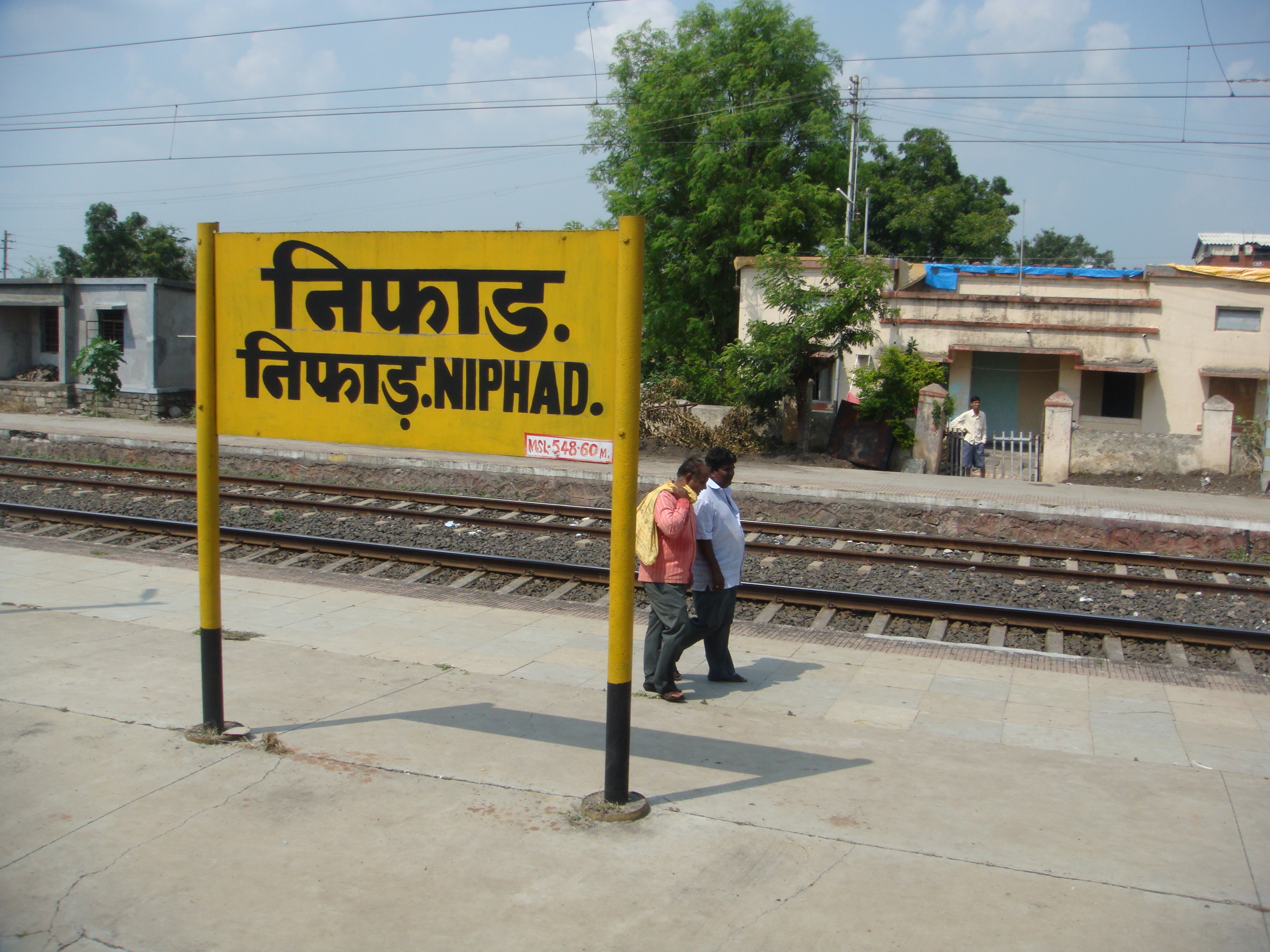
Niphad station board

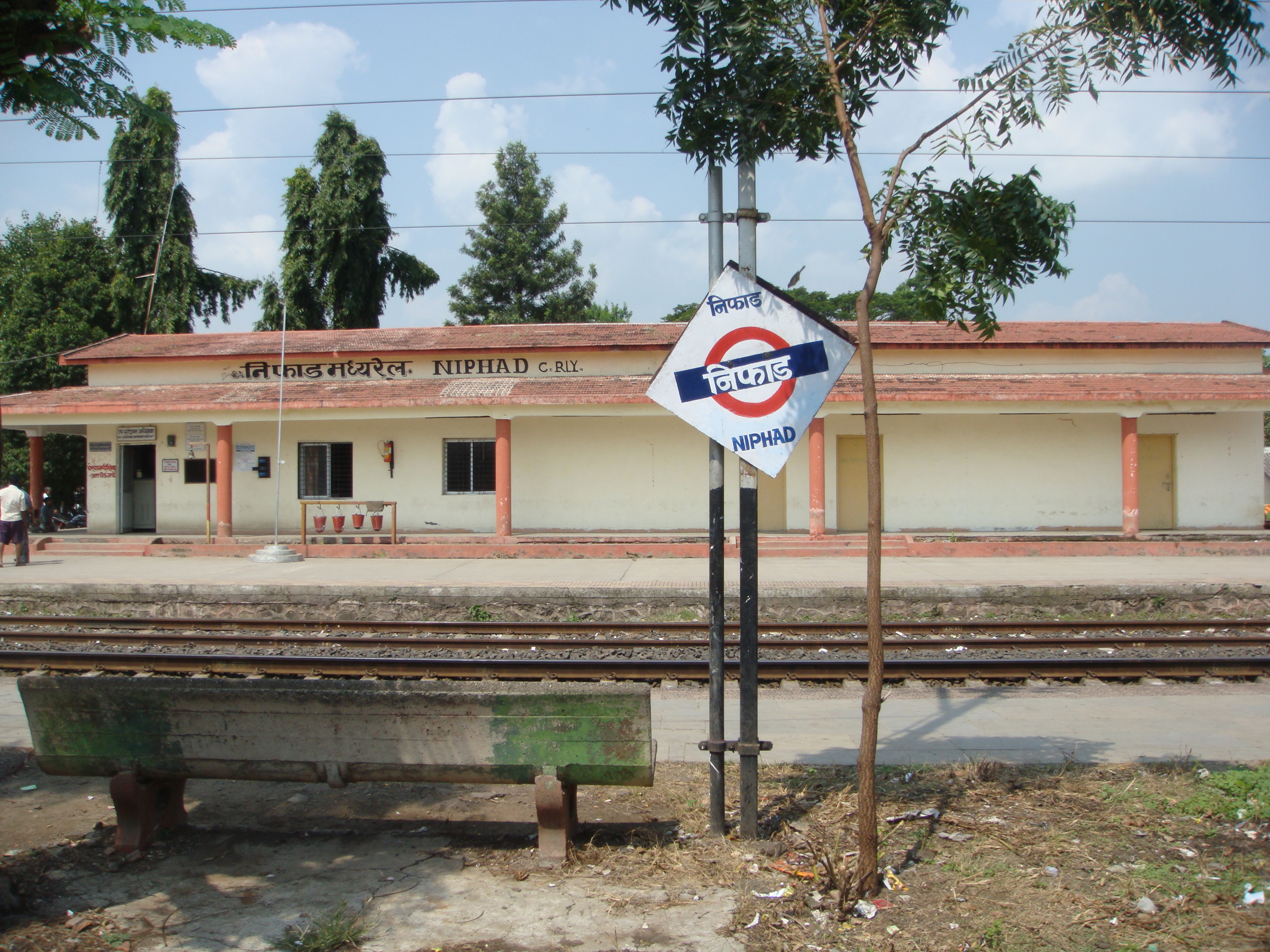
Niphad platform board

== Etymology ==
The name Niphad (निफाड) is derived from the local Marathi words Ni (without) and Phad or Pahad (mountain/hill). The name serves as a geographical descriptor, highlighting the region's completely flat, highly fertile plains within the Godavari and Kadva river basins, which sharply contrast with the rugged Sahyadri mountain ranges found in the rest of the Nashik district.

== History ==
=== Antiquity and Puranic References ===
Before the colloquial Marathi name "Niphad" came into standard usage, the region's geographical coordinates were recorded in ancient Vedic and Puranic literature. In the Brahma Purana (specifically the Gautami Mahatmya, which serves as a geographical and spiritual guide to the Godavari basin), the exact confluence of the rivers at Niphad is documented as the Kadrū-Suparṇā Saṅgama Tīrtha. According to the textual mapping in the Gautami Mahatmya:

* The modern Kadva River (historically the Kadamba) represents Kadru, the mythological mother of serpents (Nagas).
* The modern Vinita River (Vainateya) represents Suparna or Vinata, the mother of Garuda.
  This confluence is explicitly described in the original Sanskrit verse: *"suparṇa-saṃgamaṃ nāma kādravā-saṃgamaṃ tathā / maheśvaraḥ yatra devaḥ gaṅgā-pulinam āśritaḥ"* (The confluence is named Suparṇa-saṅgama and Kādravā-saṅgama, where Lord Maheśvara dwells on the banks of the river).[4] This textual description aligns with the historic Sangameshwar Mahadev Temple (Lord of the Confluence), a Hemadpanti stone structure situated precisely at this river junction in Niphad today.

During the period of the Satavahana and Western Kshatrapa empires (c. 1st–3rd century CE), the Niphad agrarian basin fell under the wealthy administrative province of Govardhana Aahara. The agricultural revenue generated from these fertile river valleys directly supported the major monastic complexes and rock-cut caves at nearby Pandavleni.

=== Medieval Era and First Textual Record ===
The absolute oldest known textual reference to the exact name "Niphad" appears in the Lilacharitra (c. 1278 CE), the first prose text written in the Marathi language by Mhaimbhat. The text maps the travels of Sarvadnya Shri Chakradhar Swami, the founder of the Mahanubhav Panth. In one of the recorded historical events, Chakradhar Swami arrives in "Niphad" (नीफाड) and rests at the local Narayan Math. The text documents an interaction with an ascetic named Aatmaram who had taken a vow to consume only milk (Payovrata). This 13th-century record confirms that Niphad was a well-established, functional settlement with active temples and monasteries during the Yadava dynasty of Devagiri.

=== Maratha and Modern Era ===
During the 17th and 18th centuries, Niphad gained prominent administrative importance under the Maratha Empire and the Holkar dynasty. Sardar Yashwantrao Fanse, a trusted commander, was married to Muktabai, the daughter of Queen Ahilyabai Holkar. The town of Niphad and surrounding villages were granted to them as a Jagir (fiefdom). The historic Fanse Wada remains in Niphad, where descendants preserve Maratha-era weaponry and ancient copper plates (Tamrapat). Concrete epigraphic evidence from this era is found across the taluka:

* A stone inscription in a stepwell (Barav) at the nearby Netale village confirms its construction in 1747 CE (Shaka 1669) by Gangoba Chandrachud, a prominent minister of the Holkars.
* A 25-foot lamp pillar (Dipmaal) at the Gangamadhyameshwar temple near the Nandur Madhmeshwar confluence bears an inscription dated 1788 CE (Shaka 1661).

By 1861, under British administration, older sub-divisions were reorganized, and Niphad was officially established as a geopolitical headquarters and independent taluka.

== Niphad Town ==
About 40 km (25 mi) northeast of Nashik, the town lies on the Nashik–Aurangabad Highway and has a station on the Mumbai–Nagpur section of the Central Railway. Although facilities in the surrounding villages are improving, the town remains the local transportation and communication hub as well as the seat of government and law enforcement, with additional district courts serving the Niphad, Yeola and Pimpalgaon Baswant courts. Niphad is also the center for medical and veterinary care, trade, banking (with Canara Bank, State Bank of India, Bank of Maharashtra, Oriental Bank of Commerce, Corporation Bank, State Bank of Hyderabad, HDFC Bank, Land Development Bank branches and many Co-operative Banks. It is also a center for education, with high schools, junior colleges, senior colleges, government ITI and other technical Institutes.

== Religious sites ==
Niphad Town is home to a number of Hindu temples dedicated to various deities, as well as to a Dargah and a few mosques. A traditional fair in honour of Shree Khandoba (not to be confused with another Khandoba fair in Chandori in the Taluka) is held on Magha Shuddha Paurnima and attracts a large number of people from the surrounding areas.

== Flora and fauna ==
Agrarian Niphad is one of the district's most fertile—and flood-prone—talukas. Its major rivers are the Godavari and its tributary, the Kadwa; as of 1975 irrigation was achieved by means of the Vadali river dam, bandhara, near the taluka, in addition to "well over a hundred" wells. Sugarcane is one of the most important agricultural products and the basis for a sugar refining and alcohol distilling industry, conducted at two co-operative sugar factories, the Niphad Sahakari Sakhar Karkhana in Bhausahebnagar and the Karmaveer Kakasaheb Wagh Sahakari Sakhar Karkhana in Kakasahebnagar. Major wine producers in the Vinchur MIDC area are the Vinsura and Vinsula wineries. Other major crops include onions, grapes, soybean, tomatoes and flowers, all exported internationally, as well as wheat, gram, and other vegetables and grains (pearl millet, sorghum, tur).

Wine Industry : Niphad is the largest grape processing location in India. Niphad has been described as "California of Maharashtra" due to the numerous grape growing area and wineries in the taluka, There are 10 wineries in Niphad. Vinchur Wine park is reserve for wine industry. Every year wineries celebrates Wine festival "India Grape Harvest" (IGH) in the harvest season. Vinsura, WIC, Vintage, Nipha Winery are involved in Wine tourism activities in the Niphad taluka.

== Demographics ==
In the 2011 census, the niphad town has population of 20249 of which 10371 are males while 9878 are females.

Niphad town has higher literacy rate compared to Maharashtra. In 2011, literacy rate of Niphad town was 82.39% compared to 82.34% of Maharashtra. In Niphad Male literacy stands at 87.32% while female literacy rate was 77.31%.

== See also ==
- Khaede
