= Bikaner–Bilaspur Antyodaya Express =

Overview
- Service type: Antyodaya Express
- Status: Discontinued from 11 June 2020
- First service: 13 July 2018; 7 years ago
- Current operator: North Western Railways

Route
- Termini: Bikaner Junction (BKN); Bilaspur Junction (BSP)
- Stops: 19
- Distance travelled: 1,946 km (1,209 mi)
- Average journey time: 37 hours 30 mins
- Service frequency: Weekly (Note: Run once in a week for every direction.)
- Train number: 14719 / 14720

On-board services
- Class: Unreserved
- Seating arrangements: Yes
- Sleeping arrangements: No
- Catering facilities: No
- Baggage facilities: Yes

Technical
- Rolling stock: LHB-Antyodaya
- Track gauge: 1,676 mm (5 ft 6 in)
- Operating speed: 52 km/h (32 mph) Avg. Speed

The 14719 / 14720 Bikaner–Bilaspur Antyodaya Express is an Express train belonging to North Western Railway zone that runs between Bikaner Junction and Bilaspur Junction.

It is being operated with 14719/14720 train numbers on a weekly basis.

== Service ==
- 14719 Bikaner–Bilaspur Antyodaya Express has an average speed of 52 km/h and covers 1946 km in 37 hrs 30 mins.
- 14720 Bilaspur–Bikaner Antyodaya Express has an average speed of 51 km/h and covers 1946 km in 38 hrs 10 mins.

Service discontinued due to a low occupancy from 11 June 2020.

== Route & halts ==
The important halts of the train are:

- Bikaner Junction
- Suratgarh Junction
- Hanumangarh Junction
- Nohar
- Tahsil Bhadra
- Sadulpur Junction
- Churu Junction
- Ratangarh Junction
- Sujangarh
- Degana Junction
- Jaipur Junction
- Sawai Madhopur Junction
- Kota Junction
- Guna Junction
- Bina Malkhedi Junction
- Saugor
- Damoh
- Katni Murwara
- Shahdol
- Anuppur Junction
- Bilaspur Junction

== Schedule ==
Train number	Station code	Departure station	Departure time	Departure day	Arrival station	Arrival time	Arrival day
14719	BKN	Bikaner Junction	08:10 AM	Wed	Bilaspur Junction	21:40 PM	Thu
14720	BSP	Bilaspur Junction	11:25 AM	Fri	Bikaner Junction	01:35 AM	Sun

== Direction reversal ==
Train reverses its direction at:

- Hanumangarh Junction
- Degana Junction
- Sawai Madhopur Junction
- Kota Junction

== Traction ==
Both trains are hauled by a Bhagat Ki Kothi-based WDP-4 or WDP-4B between Bikaner Junction and Sawai Madhopur Junction. After Sawai Madhopur Junction, both trains are hauled by an Electric Loco Shed, Lallaguda or Royapuram-based WAP-7.

== See also ==
- Antyodaya Express
