= Chhoti Khatu railway station =

Rail station in Rajasthan, India

Chhoti Khatu

General information
- Location: Chhoti Khatu, didwana-kuchaman district, Rajasthan; India
- Coordinates: 27.156062°N 74.357485°E
- Elevation: 338 metres (1,109 ft)
- System: Indian Railways station
- Owner: Indian Railways
- Operator: North Western Railway
- Lines: Jodhpur–Bathinda line Falna–Merta Road line
- Platforms: 1
- Tracks: 1

Construction
- Structure type: Standard (on-ground station)
- Parking: Yes
- Cycle facilities: No

Other information
- Status: Functioning
- Station code: CTKT
- Zone(s): North Western Railway
- Division(s): Jodhpur
Location
- Location within India Location within Rajasthan

Chhoti Khatu railway station is a railway station in Didwana-Kuchaman district, Rajasthan, India. Its code is CTKT. It serves Chhoti Khatu town. The station consists of a single platform. Passenger, Express, and Superfast trains halt here.

== Trains ==
The following trains halt at Chhoti Khatu railway station in both directions:

- Bandra Terminus–Jammu Tawi Vivek Express
- Jodhpur–Delhi Sarai Rohilla Superfast Express
- Salasar Express
- Bhagat Ki Kothi–Kamakhya Express
