= Ladnun railway station =

Railway station in Rajasthan, India

Ladnun

General information
- Location: Ladnun, Nagaur district, Rajasthan; India
- Coordinates: 27.645867°N 74.406291°E
- Elevation: 330 metres (1,080 ft)
- System: Indian Railways station
- Owner: Indian Railways
- Operator: North Western Railway
- Lines: Jodhpur–Bathinda line Falna–Merta Road line
- Platforms: 2
- Tracks: 2

Construction
- Structure type: Standard (on-ground station)
- Parking: Yes
- Cycle facilities: No

Other information
- Status: Functioning
- Station code: LAU
- Zone(s): North Western Railway
- Division(s): Jodhpur
Location
- Location within India Location within Rajasthan

Ladnun railway station is a railway station in Nagaur district, Rajasthan. Its code is LAU. It serves Ladnun town. The station consists of two platforms. Passenger, Express, and Superfast trains halt here.

== Trains ==
The following trains halt at Ladnun railway station in both directions:

- Bandra Terminus–Jammu Tawi Vivek Express
- Jodhpur–Delhi Sarai Rohilla Superfast Express
- Salasar Express
- Bhagat Ki Kothi–Kamakhya Express
- Howrah Barmer superfast Biweekly express
- jodhpur rewari express
- Merta Road Ratangarh/churu passenger
- jammu Tawi - Bandra vivek express
- Hisar -Bandra Termins express
- Barmer-Howrah express
- Delhi sarai rohilla -Johdpur superfast express
- Jodhpur- Hissar Express
- Rewari- Jodhpur express
- Hisar- Johdpur express
- Churu/Ratangarh-Merta Road passenger
