= Sujangarh =

City in Rajasthan, India

- City
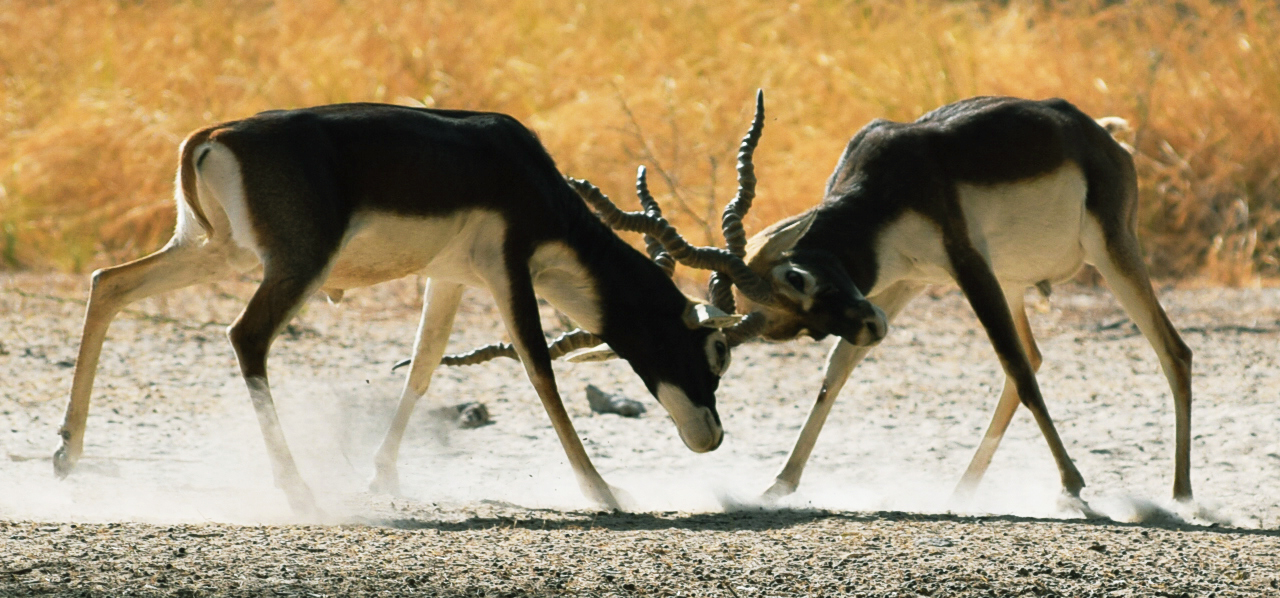
- Black Buck at Taal Chhapar

- Location in Rajasthan, India
- Coordinates: 27.7°N 74.47°E
- Country: India
- State: Rajasthan
- District: Churu District
- Founder: Sujan Singh
- Named for: Sujan Singh

Government
  - Type: Municipality

Area
  - Total: 64 km^{2} (25 sq mi)
- Elevation: 312 m (1,024 ft)

Population (2011)
  - Total: 101,528
  - Rank: 25
  - Density: 1,600/km^{2} (4,100/sq mi)

Languages
  - Official: Hindi, Marwari
- Time zone: UTC+5:30 (IST)
- PIN: 331507
- Telephone code: 01568
- Vehicle registration: RJ 44

Sujangarh is a city and Sub District in Churu District in the Shekhawati region of Rajasthan, India. Sujangarh lies on the Churu city-Pali Highway (NH 65) and Hanumangarh-Kishangarh Mega Highway. The town is well known for a second Tirupati Balaji Temple.The first one being in Tirumala – the Tirupati Balaji Venkateshwar Mandir. It is the first of its kind built in South Indian style, in Rajasthan. Lord Shiva Temple on Sujangarh Road in Thardaa and Dungar Balaji on Sujangarh - Dungar Balaji Road in Gopalpura are other two nearby Hindu temples that are popular. Sri Devsagar Singhee Jain Mandir at Sujangarh is a century-old Jain Tirth that is located within the town.

== Demographics ==
As of 2011, India census, Sujangarh had a population of 101,528; 52,078 males and 49,450 females, giving a sex ratio of 950. The average literacy rate was 74%, male literacy was 85%, and female literacy was 63%. 14,723 (14.5%) of the population was under 6 years of age.

== Geography ==
Sujangarh is located at 27.7°N 74.47°E. It has an average elevation of 312 metres (1023 feet).

Sunangarh is situated in the Thar Desert, on the dhoras (large sand dunes).

== Notable people ==
- Mubarak Begum, playback singer.
- P. K. Mishra, Hindustani poet and lyricist
- Khemchand Prakash, musician (Aayega Aane Wala from Mahal 1949)
- Kanhaiyalal Sethia, Rajasthani and Hindi poet

== Education and institutes ==
Industrial Training Institute- Sujangarh (Churu), is entrusted with the responsibility of providing trained technical manpower for the technological upgrade of industrial production, services, productivity and innovation, contributing to the planned growth of the country's economy.

== Tourist Place's ==
- Tal Chhapar Sanctuary, it's a wildlife sanctuary.
- Salasar Balaji Temple, it's a hindu religious place and temple.

== Transportation ==
Sujangarh railway station is major railway station in the town. Many Superfast and passenger train halts in the Station.

- Trains

The following trains halt at Sujangarh railway station in both directions:

- Bandra Terminus–Jammu Tawi Vivek Express
- Jodhpur–Delhi Sarai Rohilla Superfast Express
- Salasar Express
- Bhagat Ki Kothi–Kamakhya Express
