= Ratangarh Junction railway station =

Railway Station in Rajasthan, India

Ratangarh Junction

General information
- Location: Ratangarh, Churu district, Rajasthan; India
- Coordinates: 28.067174°N 74.626076°E
- Elevation: 313 metres (1,027 ft)
- System: Indian Railways station
- Owner: Indian Railways
- Operator: North Western Railway
- Line: Bikaner–Rewari line
- Platforms: 3
- Tracks: 5

Construction
- Structure type: Standard (on-ground station)
- Parking: Yes
- Cycle facilities: No

Other information
- Status: Active
- Station code: RTGH
- Zone(s): North Western Railway
- Division(s): Bikaner
Location
- Location within India Location within Rajasthan

Ratangarh Junction railway station is a railway station in Churu district, Rajasthan. Its code is RTGH. It serves Ratangarh town. The station consists of three platforms. Passenger, Express, and Superfast trains halt here.

== Trains ==
The following trains halt at Ratangarh Junction railway station in both directions:

- Bandra Terminus–Jammu Tawi Vivek Express
- Jodhpur–Delhi Sarai Rohilla Superfast Express
- Salasar Express
- Bhagat Ki Kothi–Kamakhya Express
- Bikaner–Bilaspur Antyodaya Express
- Delhi Sarai Rohilla–Bikaner Superfast Express
- Bikaner–Haridwar Express
- Indore–Bikaner Mahamana Express
- Howrah–Jaisalmer Superfast Express
- Secunderabad–Hisar Express
- Bikaner Delhi Sarai Rohilla Intercity Express
