= Didwana railway station =

Rail station in Rajasthan, India

Didwana

General information
- Location: Didwana, Didwana district, Rajasthan; India
- Coordinates: 27.403820°N 74.562508°E
- Elevation: 342 metres (1,122 ft)
- System: Indian Railways station
- Owner: Indian Railways
- Operator: North Western Railway
- Lines: Jodhpur–Bathinda line Falna–Merta Road line
- Platforms: 2
- Tracks: 2

Construction
- Structure type: Standard (on-ground station)
- Parking: Yes
- Cycle facilities: No

Other information
- Status: Functioning
- Station code: DIA
- Zone(s): North Western Railway
- Division(s): Jodhpur
Location
- Location within India Location within Rajasthan

Didwana railway station is a railway station in the Didwana district, of the Rajasthan state of India. Its code is DIA, and it serves the Didwana town. The station has two platforms. Passenger, Express, and Superfast trains halt here.

== Trains ==
The following trains halt at Didwana railway station in both directions:

- Bandra Terminus–Jammu Tawi Vivek Express
- Jodhpur–Delhi Sarai Rohilla Superfast Express
- Salasar Express
- Bhagat Ki Kothi–Kamakhya Express
