= Jamsar railway station =

Railway station in Rajasthan, India

Jamsar

General information
- Location: Jalalsar, Bikaner district, Rajasthan; India
- Coordinates: 28.24751°N 73.398985°E
- Elevation: 182 metres (597 ft)
- System: Indian Railways station
- Owner: Indian Railways
- Operator: North Western Railway
- Line: Jodhpur–Bathinda line
- Platforms: 1
- Tracks: Single Electric-Line

Construction
- Structure type: Standard (on-ground station)

Other information
- Status: Functioning
- Station code: JMS
- Zone(s): North Western Railway
- Division(s): Bikaner

Services
Preceding station	Indian Railways	Following station
Kanasar towards ?	North Western Railway zone Jodhpur–Bathinda line	Jagdevwala towards ?
Location
- Interactive map

Jamsar railway station is a railway station located on the Jodhpur–Bathinda railway line operated by the North Western Railway zone under Bikaner railway division. It is situated at Jalalsar in Bikaner district in the Indian state of Rajasthan.
