= Kanasar railway station =

Railway station in Rajasthan, India

Kanasar

General information
- Location: Kanasar, Bikaner district, Rajasthan; India
- Coordinates: 28.145913°N 73.324726°E
- Elevation: 209 metres (686 ft)
- System: Indian Railways station
- Owner: Indian Railways
- Operator: North Western Railway
- Line: Jodhpur–Bathinda line
- Platforms: 1
- Tracks: Single Electric-Line

Construction
- Structure type: Standard (on-ground station)

Other information
- Status: Functioning
- Station code: KNSR
- Zone(s): North Western Railway
- Division(s): Bikaner

Services
Preceding station	Indian Railways	Following station
Lalgarh Junction towards ?	North Western Railway zone Jodhpur–Bathinda line	Jamsar towards ?
Location
- Interactive map

Kanasar railway station is a railway station located on the Jodhpur–Bathinda railway line operated by the North Western Railway zone under Bikaner railway division. It is situated at Kanasar in Bikaner district in the Indian state of Rajasthan.
