= Dulmera railway station =

Railway station in Rajasthan, India

Dulmera

General information
- Location: Dulmera, Lunkaransar Tehsil, Bikaner district, Rajasthan; India
- Coordinates: 28.417832°N 73.65658°E
- Elevation: 200 metres (660 ft)
- System: Indian Railways station
- Owner: Indian Railways
- Operator: North Western Railway
- Line: Jodhpur–Bathinda line
- Platforms: 1
- Tracks: Single Electric-Line

Construction
- Structure type: Standard (on-ground station)

Other information
- Status: Functioning
- Station code: DLC
- Zone(s): North Western Railway
- Division(s): Bikaner

Services
Preceding station	Indian Railways	Following station
Dhirera towards ?	North Western Railway zone Jodhpur–Bathinda line	Lunkaransar towards ?
Location
- Interactive map

Dulmera railway station is a railway station located on the Jodhpur–Bathinda railway line operated by the North Western Railway zone under Bikaner railway division. It is situated at Dulmera, Lunkaransar Tehsil in Bikaner district in the Indian state of Rajasthan.
