= Sadulpur Junction railway station =

Railway Station in Rajasthan, India

Sadulpur Junction

General information
- Location: Rajgarh, Churu district, Rajasthan; India
- Coordinates: 28.628685°N 75.390686°E
- System: Indian Railways station
- Owner: Indian Railways
- Operator: North Western Railway
- Lines: Bikaner–Rewari line Sadulpur–Hisar line Shri Ganganagar–Sadulpur line
- Platforms: 5
- Tracks: 5

Construction
- Structure type: Standard (on-ground station)
- Parking: Yes
- Cycle facilities: No

Other information
- Status: Active
- Station code: SDLP
- Zone(s): North Western Railway
- Division(s): Bikaner

Passengers
- Busy railway jn.
Location
- Location within India Location within Rajasthan

Sadulpur Junction railway station is a railway station in Churu district, Rajasthan. Its code is SDLP. It serves Rajgarh town. The station consists of three platforms. Passenger, Express, and Superfast trains halt here.

== Trains ==
The following trains halt at Sadulpur Junction railway station in both directions:

- Bandra Terminus–Jammu Tawi Vivek Express
- Jodhpur–Delhi Sarai Rohilla Superfast Express
- Salasar Express
- Bhagat Ki Kothi–Kamakhya Express
- Bikaner–Bilaspur Antyodaya Express
- Delhi Sarai Rohilla–Bikaner Superfast Express
- Bikaner–Haridwar Express
- Amrapur Aravali Express
- Howrah–Jaisalmer Superfast Express
- Secunderabad–Hisar Express
- Bikaner–Delhi Sarai Rohilla Intercity Express
- Hisar–Coimbatore AC Superfast Express
- Bikaner-Sealdah AC Duronto Express
