= Ghotra, Rajasthan =

Ghotra is a village located in Sujangarh tehsil in the Churu District, Rajasthan, India. As of the 2011 Census of India it had a population of 683.
