= NHR =

NHR may refer to:

- Isuzu NHR, a medium-duty truck
- Naro language, a Khoe language spoken in Ghanzi District of Botswana and in eastern Namibia
- National Helium Reserve, the strategic helium gas reserve of the United States
- Neuro Hypnotic Repatterning, a technique developed by Richard Bandler
- New Hart's Rules, a style guide by Oxford University Press
- Newman/Haas Racing, a motor racing team
- Nohar railway station, in Rajasthan, India
- Non-Habitual Resident, in Portugal
- Nuclear hormone receptor
