= Delhi Sarai Rohilla–Bikaner Express (via Sri Ganganagar) =

Passenger train in India

Delhi Sarai Rohilla – Bikaner SF Express
Overview
- Service type: Express
- First service: 30 March 2011; 15 years ago
- Current operator: North Western Railway zone

Route
- Termini: Delhi Sarai Rohilla (DEE); Bikaner Junction (BKN)
- Stops: 12
- Distance travelled: 802 km (498 mi)
- Average journey time: 14 hours 30
- Service frequency: Daily (Note: Runs seven days in a week for every direction.)
- Train number: 12455/12456

On-board services
- Classes: AC 2 tier, AC 3 tier, Sleeper Class, General Unreserved
- Seating arrangements: Yes
- Sleeping arrangements: Yes
- Catering facilities: Yes

Technical
- Rolling stock: 2
- Track gauge: 1,676 mm (5 ft 6 in)
- Operating speed: 55 km/h (34 mph), including halts

The Delhi Sarai Rohilla – Bikaner SF Express is an express train belonging to Indian Railways – North Western Railway zone that runs between Bikaner Junction and Delhi Sarai Rohilla in India.

It operates as train number 12456 from Bikaner Junction to Delhi Sarai Rohilla and as train number 12455 in the reverse direction serving the states of Rajasthan, Haryana and Delhi.

== Coach composite ==
The train has standard LHB rakes, with a maximum speed of 110 km/h, though the operational speed is only half of that. The train consists of 15 coaches viz., 1 AC First-class, 2 AC II Tier, 3 AC III Tier, 5 Sleeper Coaches, 2 General & 2 Second-class Luggage/parcel van.

== See also ==
- Delhi Sarai Rohilla railway station
- Bikaner Junction railway station
- Delhi Sarai Rohilla – Bikaner Superfast Express(via Churu)
- Bikaner Delhi Sarai Rohilla Intercity Express
