= Sujangarh railway station =

Railway station in Rajasthan, India

Sujangarh

General information
- Location: Sujangarh, Churu district, Rajasthan; India
- Coordinates: 27.710627°N 74.467577°E
- Elevation: 317 metres (1,040 ft)
- System: Indian Railways station
- Owner: Indian Railways
- Operator: North Western Railway
- Lines: Jodhpur–Bathinda line Falna–Merta Road line
- Platforms: 2
- Tracks: 3

Construction
- Structure type: Standard (on-ground station)
- Parking: Yes
- Cycle facilities: No

Other information
- Status: Functioning
- Station code: SUJH
- Zone(s): North Western Railway
- Division(s): Jodhpur
Location
- Location within India Location within Rajasthan

Sujangarh railway station is a railway station in Churu district, Rajasthan. Its code is SUJH. It serves Sujangarh town. The station consists of a pair of platforms. Passenger, Express, and Superfast trains halt here.

== Trains ==
The following trains halt at Sujangarh railway station in both directions:

- Bandra Terminus–Jammu Tawi Vivek Express
- Jodhpur–Delhi Sarai Rohilla Superfast Express
- Salasar Express
- Bhagat Ki Kothi–Kamakhya Express
