= Secunderabad–Hisar Express =

Train in India

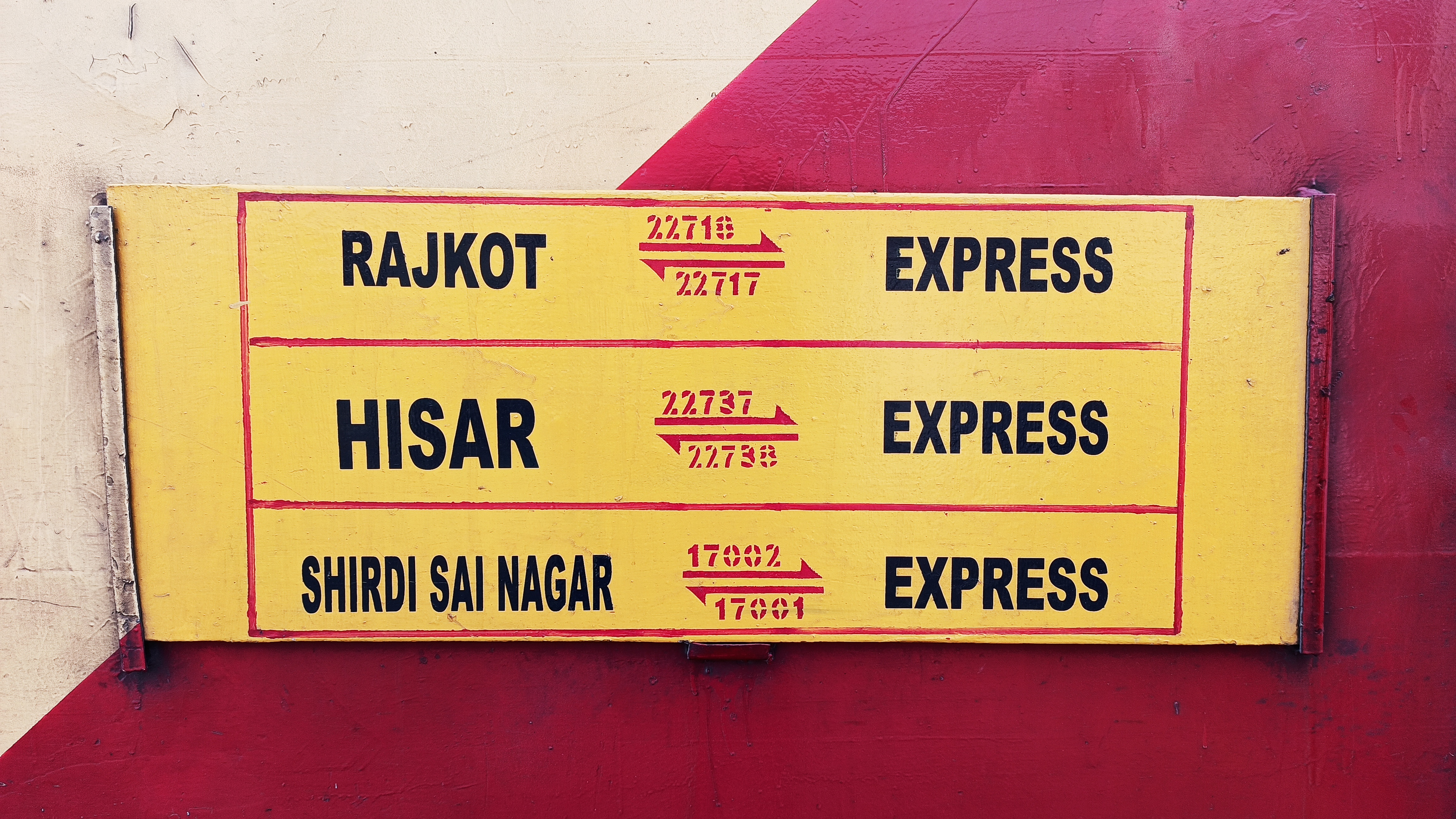

Overview
- Service type: Express
- Current operator: South Central Railway zone

Route
- Termini: Secunderabad Junction (SC); Hisar Junction (HSR)
- Stops: 32
- Distance travelled: 2,416 km (1,501 mi)
- Average journey time: 46h 20m
- Service frequency: Bi-weekly (Note: Runs two days in a week for every direction.)
- Train number: 22737/22738

On-board services
- Classes: AC 1 tier, AC 2 tier, AC 3 tier, Sleeper class, General Unreserved
- Seating arrangements: Yes
- Sleeping arrangements: Yes
- Catering facilities: Pantry Car; On-board catering E-catering
- Observation facilities: ICF coach
- Entertainment facilities: No
- Baggage facilities: No
- Other facilities: Below the seats

Technical
- Rolling stock: 2
- Track gauge: 1,676 mm (5 ft 6 in)
- Operating speed: 51 km/h (32 mph), including halts

The Secunderabad–Hisar Express is an Express train belonging to South Central Railway zone that runs between Secunderabad Junction and Hisar Junction in India. It is currently being operated with 17037/17038 train numbers on bi-weekly basis.

== Service ==
The 17037/Secunderabad–Hisar Express has an average speed of 52 km/h and covers 2416 km in 46h 20m. The 17038/Hisar–Secunderabad Express has an average speed of 52 km/h and covers 2416 km in 46h 45m.

== Route and halts ==
The important halts of the train are:

- Secunderabad Junction
- Balharshah Junction
- Wardha Junction
- Badnera Junction
- Akola Junction
- Malkapur
- Bhusaval Junction
- Jalgaon Junction
- Nandurbar
- Surat
- Vadodara Junction
- Ahmedabad Junction
- Palanpur Junction
- Abu Road
- Marwar Junction
- Pali Marwar
- Jodhpur Junction
- Merta Road Junction
- Nagaur
- Bikaner Junction
- Ratangarh Junction
- Churu Junction
- Sadulpur Junction
- Hisar Junction

== Coach composition ==
The train has standard ICF rakes with a max speed of 120 kmph. The train consists of 27 coaches:

- 1 AC I Tier
- 3 AC II Tier
- 4 AC III Tier
- 12 Sleeper coaches
- 1 Pantry car
- 2 Jeneral Unreserved
- 2 Seating cum Luggage Rake
- 1 Luggage Rake
- 1 Guard Cabin

== Traction ==
Both trains are hauled by a Lallaguda Loco Shed based WAP-7 or Bhusawal Loco Shed based WAP-4 electric locomotive from Secunderabad to Hisar Junction and vice versa.

== Rake sharing ==
The train shares its rake with 17001/17002 Sainagar Shirdi–Secunderabad Express and 17017/17018 Rajkot–Secunderabad Express.

== See also ==
- Hisar Junction railway station
- Secunderabad Junction railway station
- Sainagar Shirdi–Secunderabad Express
- Rajkot–Secunderabad Express
