= Bikaner–Rewari line =

Railway route on the North Western Railway zone of Indian Railways

Bikaner–Rewari line with Sardar Shahar and Sikar branch lines
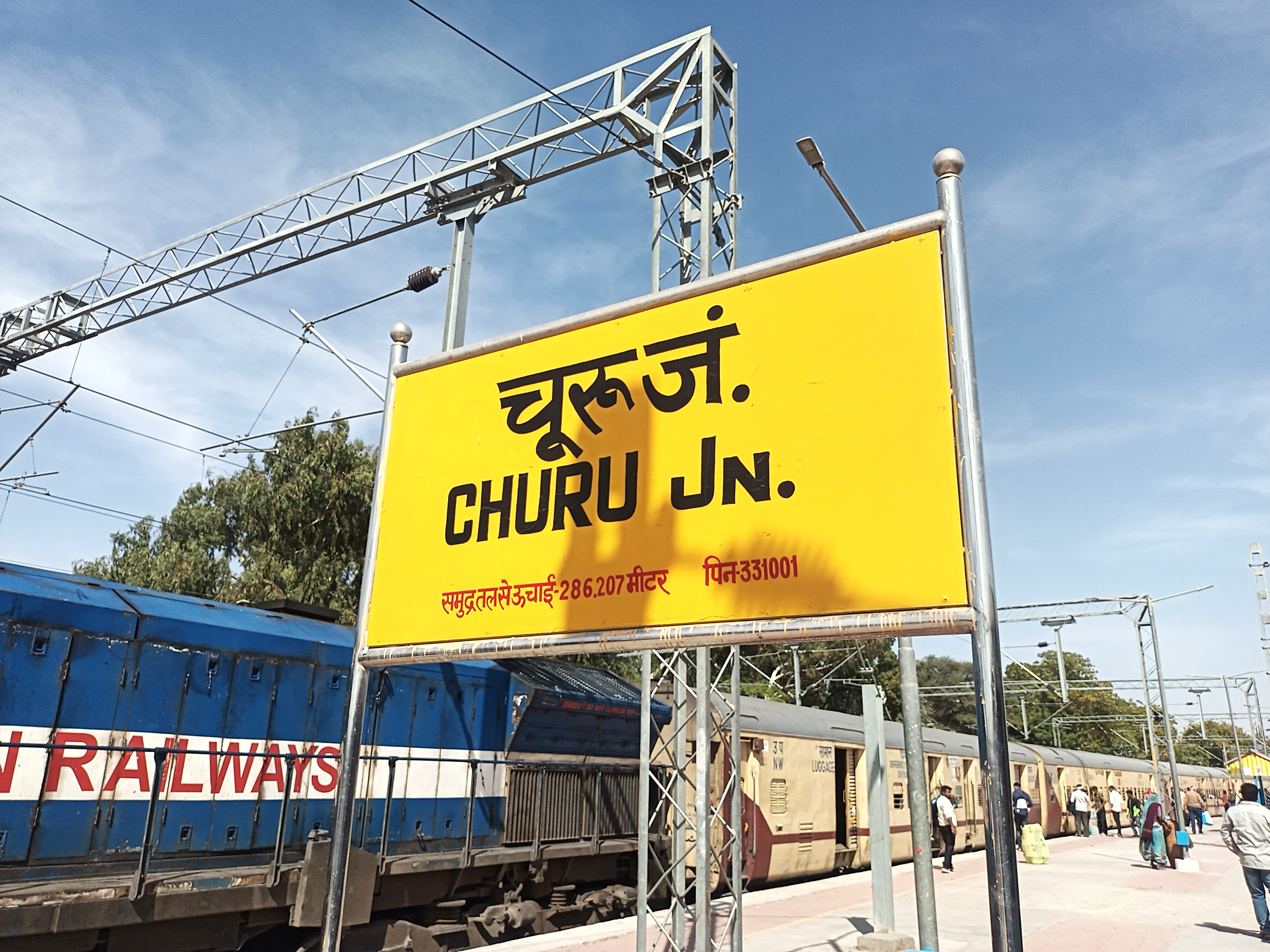
- Churu Junctionis an important railway station on Bikaner-Rewari line

Overview
- Status: Operational
- Owner: Indian Railways
- Locale: Rajasthan and Haryana
- Termini: Bikaner Junction; Rewari Junction

Service
- Operator: North Western Railway

History
- Opened: 1 March 1941 (Main line); 1 March 1916 (Sardarshahr branch); 1939 (Sikar branch)

Technical
- Line length: Main line 379 km (235 mi); Branch Lines: Ratangarh–Sardar Shahar 52 km (32 mi); Loharu–Sikar 122 km (76 mi)
- Track gauge: 1,676 mm (5 ft 6 in) Broad Gauge
- Old gauge: 1,000 mm (3 ft 3 3/8 in) Metre gauge
- Electrification: Yes
- Operating speed: 110 km/h (68 mph)

The Bikaner–Rewari line or Rewari–Bikaner line is a railway route on the North Western Railway zone of Indian Railways. This route plays an important role in rail transportation of Bikaner division and Jaipur division of Rajasthan state and Gurugram division of Haryana state.

The corridor passes through the Desert Area of Rajasthan and Haryana with a stretch of 379 km with consists of two branch lines, the First branch line starts from Loharu Junction and Ends at Sikar Junction with a stretch of 122 km, Whereas the second branch line starts from Ratangarh Junction in Reversal mode and ends at Sardar Shahar with a stretch of 52 km.

== History ==
The main railway line from Bikaner Junction to Rewari Junction was originally built by Jodhpur–Bikaner Railway company of Bikaner Princely State portion as metre-gauge line during the 19th and 20th century also. This line was opened in different phases during the construction period.

- The first phase, from Bikaner Junction to Ratangarh Junction which also called as Bikaner–Ratangarh chord line was opened on 24 November 1912.
- The second phase, from Ratangarh Junction to Churu Junction was opened on 22 May 1910.
- The third phase, from Churu Junction to Sadulpur Junction was opened on 8 July 1911.
- The fourth phase, from Sadulpur Junction to Rewari Junction was sanctioned on 4 March 1937 and after opened at 1 March 1941.

Whereas, the first branch line between Ratangarh Junction to Sardarshahr was opened on 1 March 1916. and the second branch line between Sikar Junction and Loharu Junction was built by the both companies into two sections such as Sikar Junction to Jhunjhunu section was under the Jaipur State Railway and Jhunjhunu to Loharu Junction section was under the Jodhpur–Bikaner Railway opened in different phases during the construction period.

- The first phase, from Sikar Junction to Nawalgarh was opened on 18 September 1923.
- The second phase, from Nawalgarh to Jhunjhunu was opened on 1 August 1924.
- The third phase, from Jhunjhunu to Loharu Junction was opened on 1939.

After that, the conversion into 5 ft 6 in (1,676 mm) broad gauge was completed through into different section starting from the first section between Rewari Junction to Sadulpur Junction was opened on 17 September 2008, later the second section between Sadulpur Junction and Ratangarh Junction was opened on 1 August 2010 and thereafter the third section between Ratangarh Junction and Bikaner Junction was opened on 30 March 2011.

Whereas, the Ratangarh Junction–Sardarshahr branch line was closed for conversion into 5 ft 6 in (1,676 mm) broad gauge at 8 June 2012 and reopened on 20 June 2017. and the Loharu Junction–Sikar Junction branch line was also converted to 5 ft 6 in (1,676 mm) broad gauge and opened on 2 September 2015.

== Electrification ==
Electrification of main line was started on 11 February 2019, on the first section between Rewari and Sadulpur which was declared on 2017-18 rail budget, was completed on 4 March 2020, with two stages. and the remaining sections such as Sadulpur–Churu, Churu–Ratangarh and Ratangarh–Bikaner is fully electrified .

== Trains passing through this line ==
=== Main ===
- Bikaner–Delhi Sarai Rohilla Intercity Express
- Bikaner Delhi Sarai Rohilla Superfast Express
- Hisar–Coimbatore AC Superfast Express
- Sealdah–Bikaner Duronto Express
- Indore–Bikaner Mahamana Express
- Jodhpur–Delhi Sarai Rohilla Superfast Express
- Bhagat Ki Kothi–Kamakhya Express
- Secunderabad–Hisar Express
- Salasar Express
- Bikaner–Haridwar Express
- Howrah–Jaisalmer Superfast Express

=== Branch ===
- Sikar–Delhi Sarai Rohilla Intercity Express
- Sainik Express
- Kota–Hisar Express
