= Delhi Sarai Rohilla–Jammu Tawi Duronto Express =

Delhi Sarai Rohilla - Jammu Tawi Duronto Express
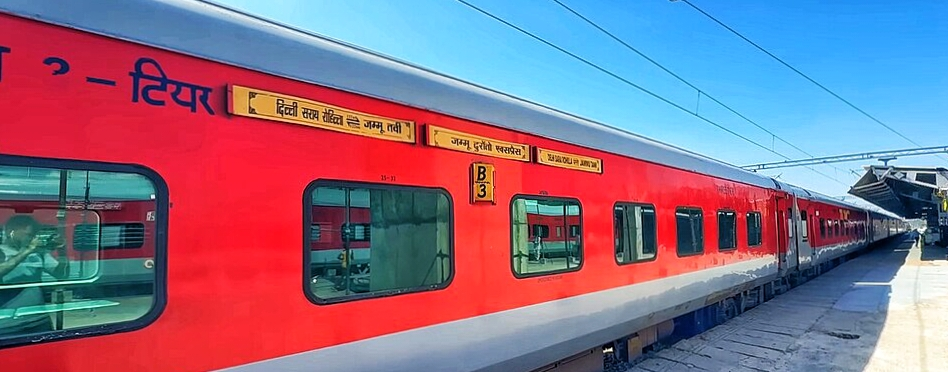
- Delhi Sarai Rohilla-Jammu Tawi Duronto Express At Ambala Cantt Junction

Overview
- Service type: Superfast Express, Duronto Express
- First service: 1 April 2010
- Current operator: Northern Railways

Route
- Termini: Delhi Sarai Rohilla(DEE); Jammu Tawi(JAT)
- Stops: 2
- Distance travelled: 576 km (358 mi)
- Average journey time: 9 hours in both directions
- Service frequency: 3 days a week. 12265 Delhi Sarai Rohilla Jammu Tawi Duronto Express – Tuesday, Friday & Sunday, 12266 Jammu Tawi Delhi Sarai Rohilla Duronto Express – Monday, Wednesday & Saturday
- Train number: 12265 / 12266

On-board services
- Classes: AC 1st Class, AC 2 tier, AC 3 tier, Sleeper Class
- Seating arrangements: No
- Sleeping arrangements: Yes
- Catering facilities: No Pantry Car Coach attached

Technical
- Rolling stock: LHB Coaches
- Track gauge: 1,676 mm (5 ft 6 in)
- Electrification: Yes
- Operating speed: 109.435392 km/h (68 mph) (Maximum Speed), 64.37376 km/h (40 mph) (Average Speed), including halts

The 12265 / 66 Delhi Sarai Rohilla-Jammu Tawi Duronto Express is a Superfast Express train of the Duronto Express category belonging to Indian Railways - Northern Railway zone that runs between Delhi Sarai Rohilla and Jammu Tawi in India.

It operates as train number 12265 from Delhi Sarai Rohilla to Jammu Tawi and as train number 12266 in the reverse direction serving the states of Delhi and Jammu and Kashmir.

== Coaches ==
The 12265 / 66 Delhi Sarai Rohilla Jammu Tawi Duronto Express presently has 1 AC First Class,1 AC 2 tier, 7 AC 3 tier, 10 Sleeper Class and 2 SLR (Seating cum Luggage Rake) coaches. It does not carry a Pantry car coach.

As is customary with most train services in India, Coach Composition may be amended at the discretion of Indian Railways depending on demand.

== Service ==
The 12265 / 66 Delhi Sarai Rohilla Jammu Tawi Duronto Express covers the distance of 578 kilometres in 09 hours 00 mins (64.22 km/h) in both directions.

As the average speed of the train is above 55 km/h (34 mph), as per Indian Railways rules, its fare includes a Superfast Express surcharge.

== Routeing and technical halts ==
The 12265 / 66 Delhi Sarai Rohilla Jammu Tawi Duronto Express runs from Delhi Sarai Rohilla having a single technical stop at Ludhiana Junction to Jammu Tawi.

== Traction ==
Previously, despite electrification of the 312 km route between Delhi Sarai Rohilla and Ludhiana Junction. i.e. 54% of the route, it was powered by a Tughlakabad based WDM 3A or WDP 4 for its entire journey.

With progressive electrification, a Ghaziabad based WAP 7 now powers the train for the entire journey.

== Timings ==
12265 Delhi Sarai Rohilla Jammu Tawi Duronto Express leaves Delhi Sarai Rohilla every Tuesday, Friday and Sunday and reaches Jammu Tawi the next day.

12266 Jammu Tawi Delhi Sarai Rohilla Duronto Express leaves Jammu Tawi every Monday, Wednesday and Saturday and reaches Delhi Sarai Rohilla the next day.
