= Bandra Terminus–Jammu Tawi Vivek Express =

Train in India

Mumbai Bandra Terminus - Jammu Tawi Vivek Express

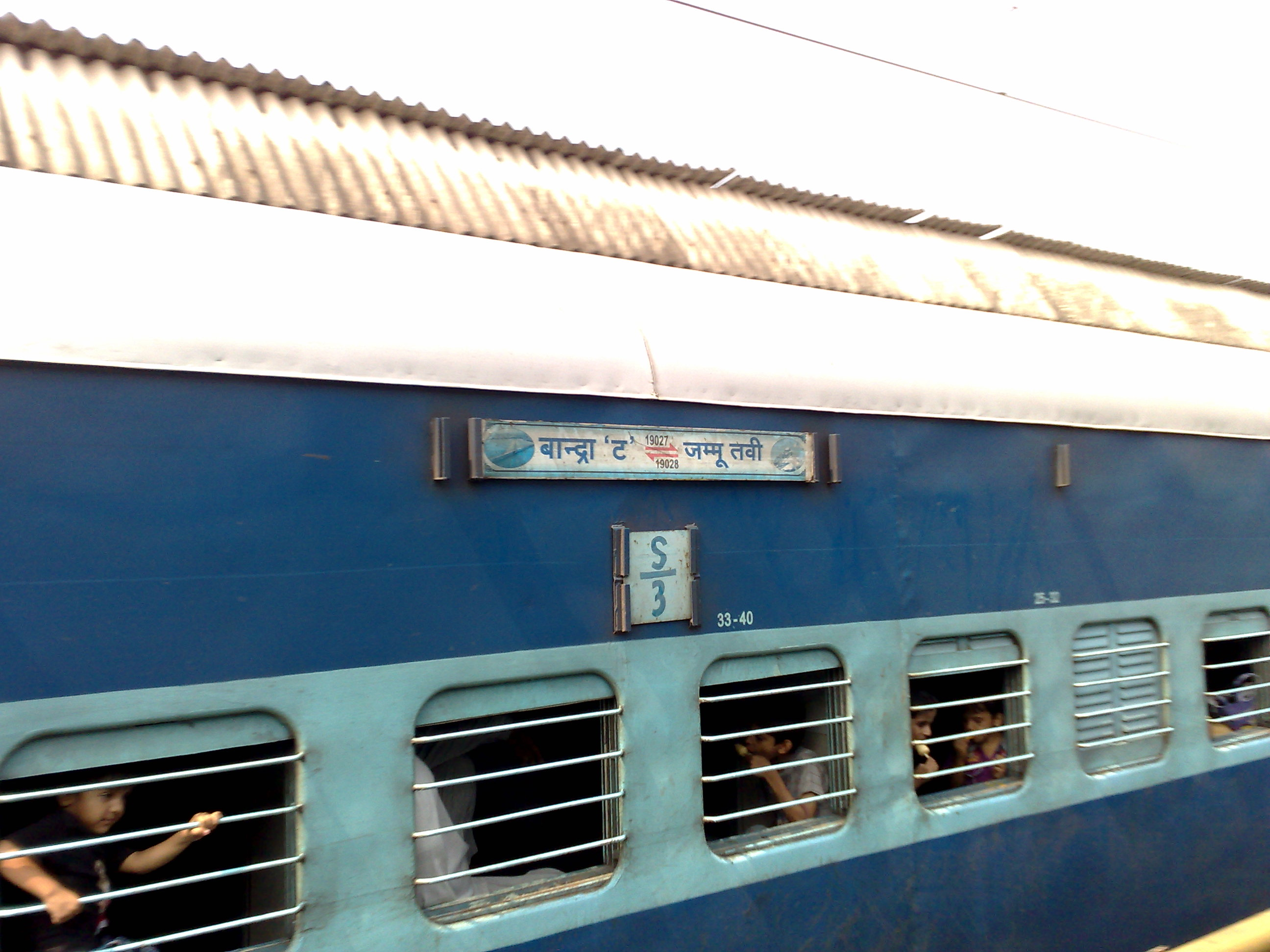

Overview
- Service type: Vivek Express
- Locale: Maharashtra, Gujarat, Rajasthan, Haryana, Punjab, Jammu and Kashmir
- First service: 17 March 2012; 14 years ago
- Current operator: Western Railways

Route
- Termini: Bandra Terminus (BDTS); Jammu Tawi (JAT)
- Stops: 31
- Distance travelled: 1,881 km (1,169 mi)
- Average journey time: 35 hours 10 minutes
- Service frequency: Weekly
- Train number: 19027 / 19028

On-board services
- Classes: AC 2 tier, AC 3 tier, Sleeper Class, General Unreserved
- Seating arrangements: Yes
- Sleeping arrangements: Yes
- Catering facilities: On-board catering E-catering
- Observation facilities: Large windows
- Baggage facilities: Available

Technical
- Rolling stock: LHB coach
- Track gauge: 1,676 mm (5 ft 6 in)
- Operating speed: 130 km/h (81 mph) maximum, 51 km/h (32 mph) average including halts
Route map
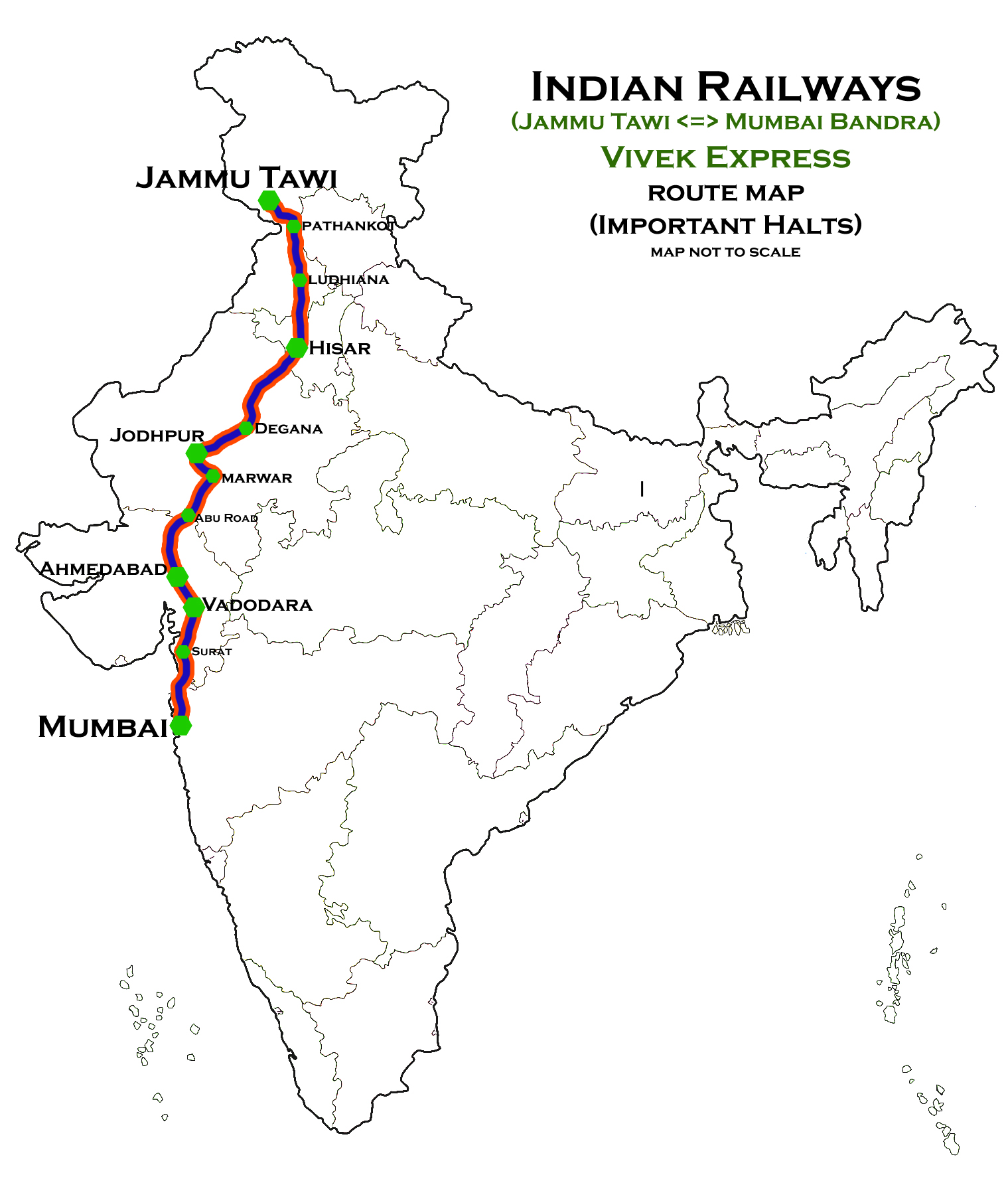

The 19027 / 19028 Bandra Terminus - Jammu Tawi Vivek Express is an express train of the Vivek Express series belonging to Indian Railways that runs between Bandra Terminus and Jammu Tawi in India.

It operates as train number 19027 from Bandra Terminus to Jammu Tawi and as train number 19028 in the reverse direction.

== Coaches ==
Earlier was used to have ICF coach. now The train has standard LHB rakes with a maximum speed of 130 km/h. The train consists of 22 coaches:

- 1 AC First cum AC II Tier
- 2 AC II Tier
- 5 AC III Tier
- 2 AC III Tier Economy
- 6 Sleeper Coaches
- 4 General Unreserved
- 2 End-on Generator

As with most train services in India, Coach Composition may be amended at the discretion of Indian Railways depending on demand.

== Service ==
The 19027 Bandra Terminus - Jammu Tawi Vivek Express covers the distance of 1881 kilometres in 37 hours 10 mins (51 km/h) and 1881 kilometres in 36 hours 55 mins (51 km/h) as 19028 Jammu Tawi - Bandra Terminus Vivek Express.

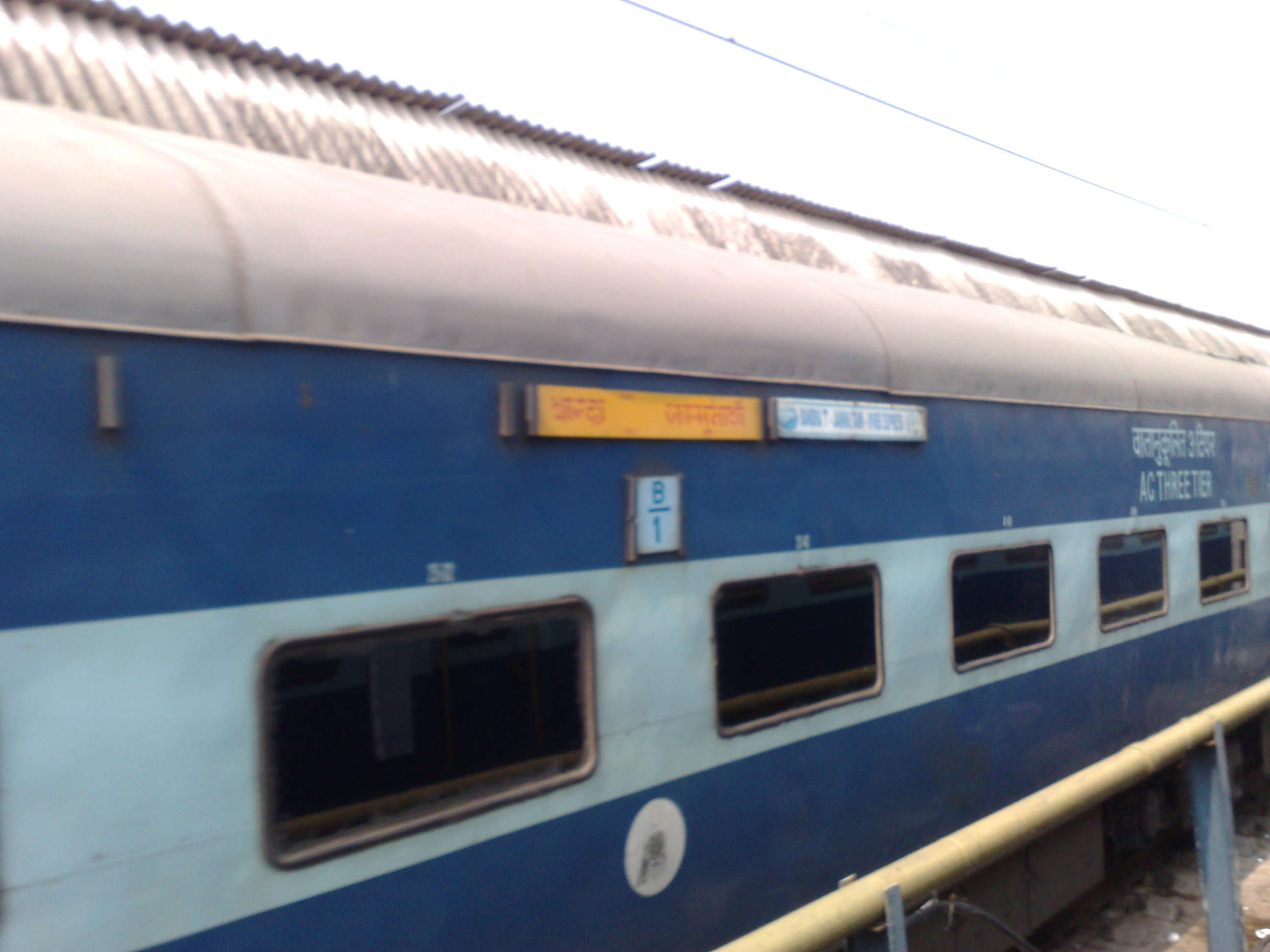
19027 Vivek Express - AC 3 tier coach

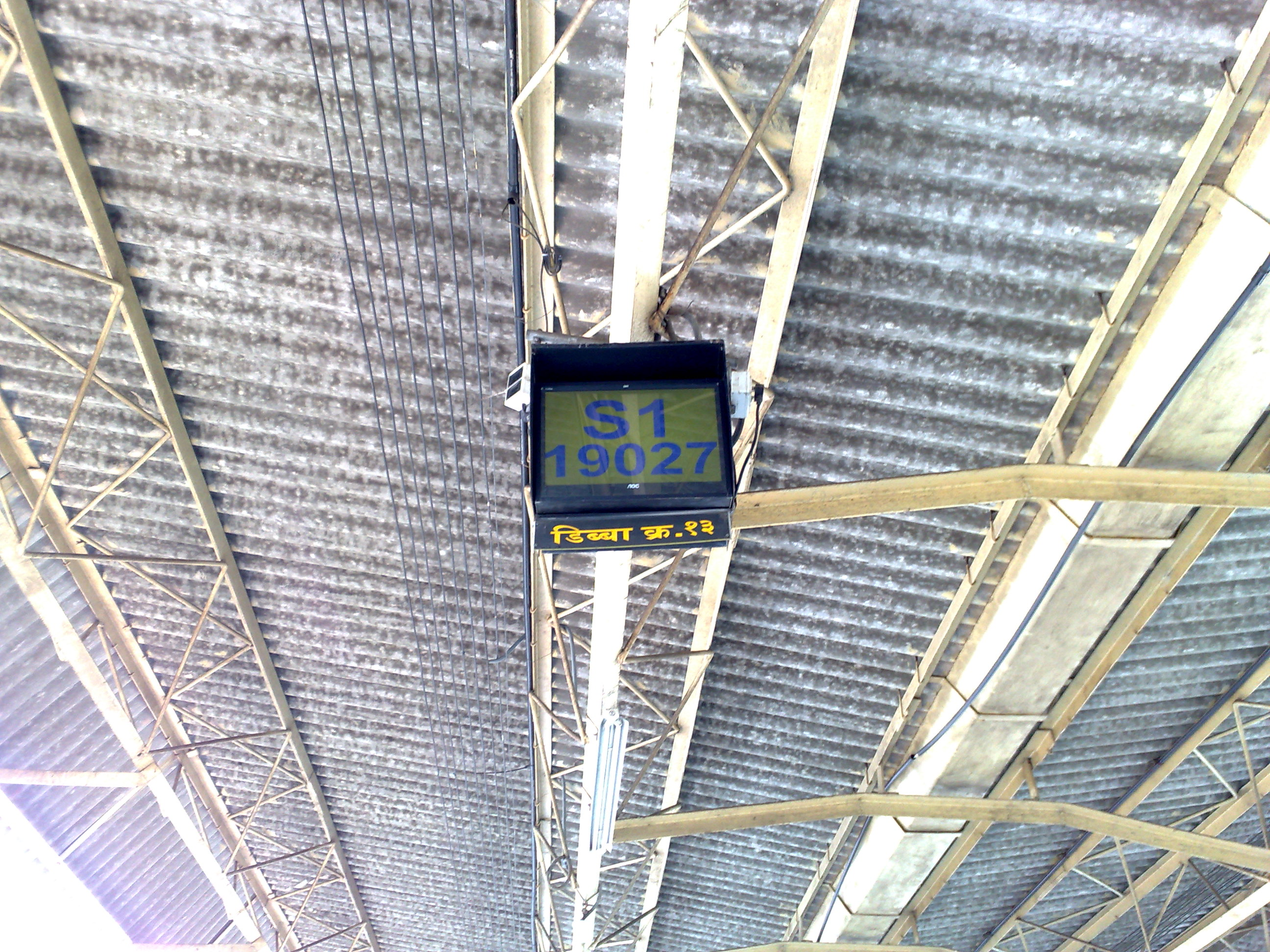
Electronic coach display board of 19027 Vivek Express

== Route & halts ==
- Bandra Terminus
- Borivali
- Vapi
- Surat
- Vadodara Junction
- Anand Junction
- Nadiad Junction
- Ahmedabad Junction
- Mahesana Junction
- Palanpur Junction
- Abu Road
- Falna
- Marwar Junction
- Pali Marwar
- Luni Junction
- Jodhpur Junction
- Gotan
- Merta Road Junction
- Degana Junction
- Chhoti Khatu
- Didwana
- Ladnun
- Sujangarh
- Ratangarh Junction
- Churu Junction
- Sadulpur Junction
- Hisar Junction
- Dhuri Junction
- Ludhiana Junction
- Jalandhar Cantonment Junction
- Pathankot Cantonment
- Kathua
- Jammu Tawi

== Schedule ==
Train Number	Station Code	Departure Station	Departure Time	Departure Day	Arrival Station	Arrival Time	Arrival Day
19027	BDTS	Bandra Terminus	12:15 PM	Sat	Jammu Tawi	01:25 AM	Mon
19028	JAT	Jammu Tawi	09:30 AM	Mon	Bandra Terminus	22:25 PM	Tue

== Rake sharing ==
The train shares its rake with 22949/22950 Bandra Terminus - Delhi Sarai Rohilla Superfast Express.

== Direction reversal ==
Train reverses direction one time at Hisar Junction.

== Traction ==
earlier they run by diesel locomotive WDP-4/4D. It is hauled by a Vadodara Loco Shed based WAP-5 / WAP-7 electric locomotive from Bandra Terminus to Jammu Tawi and vice-versa .
