= Salasar Superfast Express =

Train in India

Overview
- Service type: Superfast Express
- First service: 2 September 2009; 16 years ago
- Current operator: North Western Railway

Route
- Termini: Jodhpur (JU); Delhi Sarai Rohilla (DEE)
- Stops: 19
- Distance travelled: 623 km (387 mi)
- Average journey time: 11 hours 15 minutes
- Service frequency: Daily
- Train number: 22421 / 22422

On-board services
- Classes: AC 2 Tier, AC 3 Tier, Sleeper Class, General Unreserved
- Seating arrangements: Yes
- Sleeping arrangements: Yes
- Catering facilities: On-board catering, E-catering
- Observation facilities: Rake sharing with 12457/12458 Delhi Sarai Rohilla–Bikaner Superfast Express
- Baggage facilities: Available
- Other facilities: Below the seats

Technical
- Rolling stock: ICF coach
- Track gauge: 1,676 mm (5 ft 6 in)
- Operating speed: 57 km/h (35 mph) average including halts.

The 22421 / 22422 Salasar Superfast Express is a superfast express train belonging to Indian Railways – North Western Railway zone that runs between Delhi Sarai Rohilla and Bhagat Ki Kothi in India.

It operates as train number 22421 from Delhi Sarai Rohilla to Bhagat Ki Kothi and as train number 22422 in the reverse direction, serving the states of Rajasthan, Haryana and Delhi.

== Change of train number ==
1. 14705 > 22421
2. 14706 > 22422

== Coaches ==
The 22421 / 22 Salasar Superfast Express has 1 First Class AC Coach, 1 AC 2 tier, 3 AC 3 tier, 7 Sleeper Class, 6 General Unreserved & 2 SLR (Seating cum Luggage Rake) coaches. It does not carry a pantry car.

As is customary with most train services in India, coach composition may be amended at the discretion of Indian Railways depending on demand.

== Service ==
The 22421 Salasar Superfast Express covers the distance of 623 km (387 mi) in 11 hours 15 mins (55 km/h) and in 11 hours 15 mins as 22422 Salasar Superfast Express (55 km/h).

As the average speed of the train is above 55 km/h (34 mph), as per Indian Railways rules, its fare includes a Superfast surcharge.

== Routeing ==
The 22421 / 22422 Salasar Superfast Express runs from Delhi Sarai Rohilla via Gurgaon, Rewari, Loharu Junction, Sadulpur Junction, Churu Junction, Ratangarh Junction, Sujangarh, Didwana, Degana Junction, Merta Road Junction to Jodhpur.

== Traction ==
As the route is fully electrified, a Bhagat Ki Kothi Loco Shed-based WAP-7 electric locomotive powers the train for its entire journey.

== See also ==
- Delhi Sarai Rohilla railway station
- Bhagat Ki Kothi railway station
- Rajasthan Sampark Kranti Express
- Mandore Express
- Delhi Sarai Rohilla–Bikaner Superfast Express
