= Delhi Sarai Rohilla–Bikaner Superfast Express =

Delhi Sarai Rohilla Bikaner Superfast Express
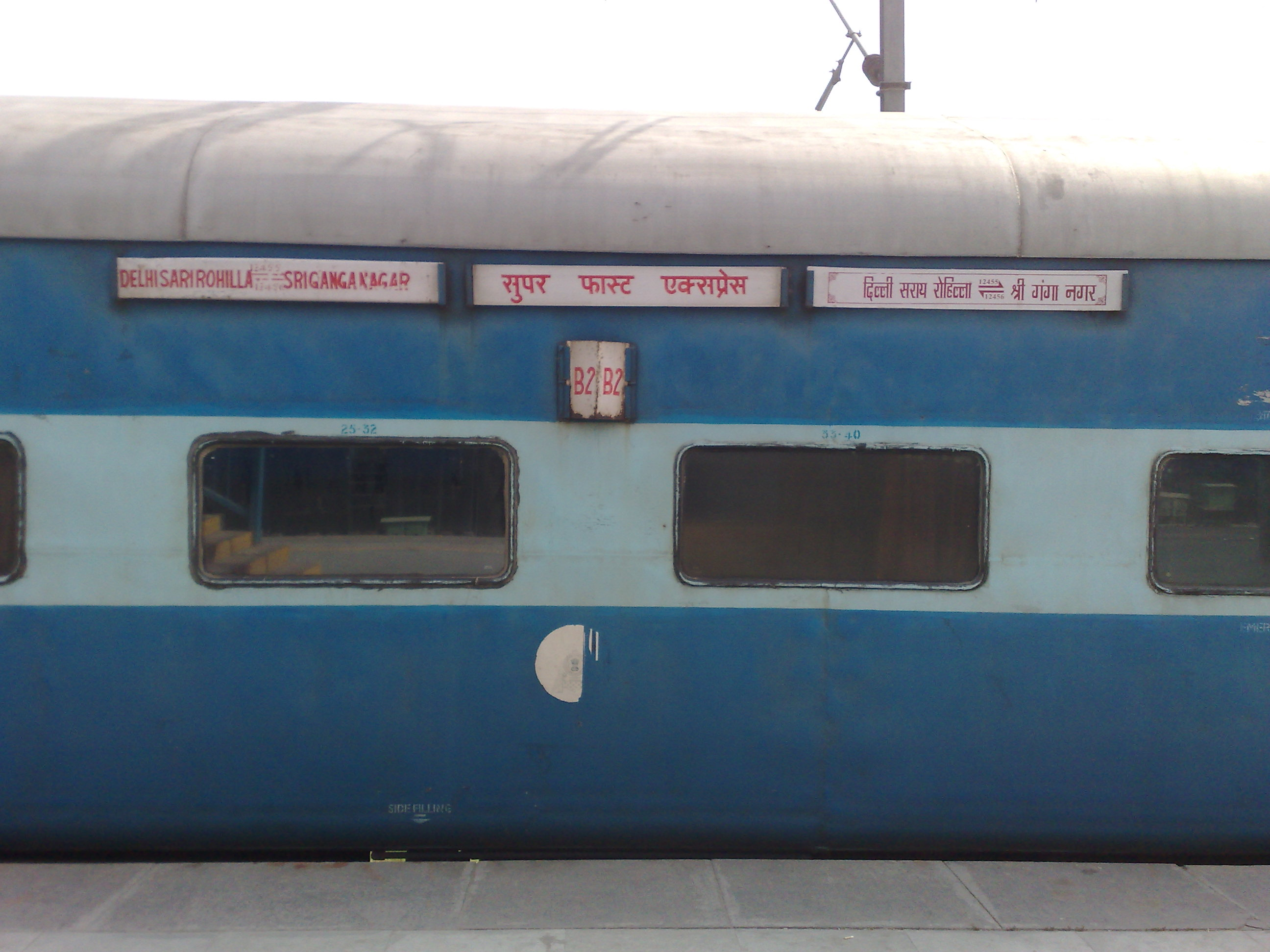

Overview
- Service type: Superfast
- First service: 4 January 2011
- Current operator: Northern Railways

Route
- Termini: Delhi Sarai Rohilla; Bikaner Junction
- Stops: 20
- Distance travelled: 805 km (500 mi)
- Average journey time: 14 hours 35 minutes in both directions
- Service frequency: Daily
- Train number: 12455 / 12456

On-board services
- Classes: AC 1st Class, AC 2 tier, AC 3 tier, Sleeper Class, Unreserved/General
- Seating arrangements: Yes
- Sleeping arrangements: Yes
- Catering facilities: No pantry car attached
- Observation facilities: Extended to Bikaner Junction w.e.f 01 September 2014

Technical
- Rolling stock: Standard Indian Railways LHB coach
- Track gauge: 1,676 mm (5 ft 6 in)
- Operating speed: 147 km/h (91 mph) maximum, 55.20 km/h (34 mph), including halts

The 12455 / 56 Delhi Sarai Rohilla–Bikaner Superfast Express is a Superfast Express train belonging to Indian Railways – Northern Railway zone that runs between Delhi Sarai Rohilla and Bikaner Junction in India.

It operates as train number 12455 from Delhi Sarai Rohilla to Bikaner Junction and as train number 12456 in the reverse direction serving the states of Delhi, Haryana, Punjab and Rajasthan.

== Coaches ==
The 12455 / 56 Delhi Sarai Rohilla–Bikaner Superfast Express has 1 AC 1st Class cum AC 2 tier, 2 AC 2 tier, 3 AC 3 tier, 5 Sleeper Class, 5 Unreserved/General and 2 end-on-generator coaches. It does not carry a pantry car

As is customary with most train services in India, coach composition may be amended at the discretion of Indian Railways depending on demand.

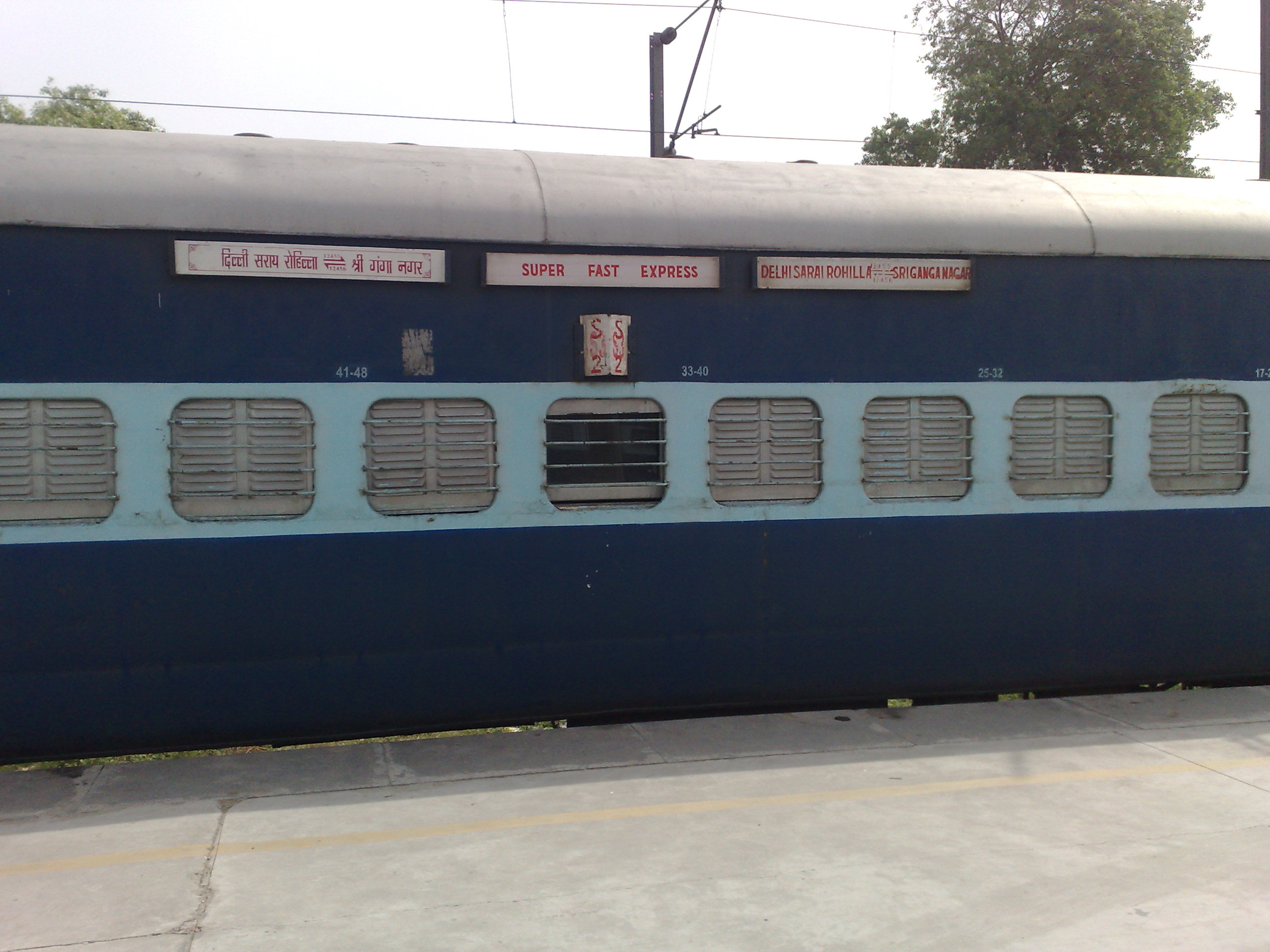
12455 Delhi Sarai Rohilla–Sri Ganganagar Superfast Express – Sleeper class coach

== Service ==
Despite its "superfast" nomenclature, the 12455 / 56 Delhi Sarai Rohilla–Bikaner Junction Superfast Express takes 14 hours 35 mins to cover a distance of 805 km (500 mi) in each direction, at an average speed of only 55.20 km/h (34 mph).

As the average speed of the train is above 55 km/h (34 mph), as per Indian Railways rules, its fare includes a Superfast surcharge.

== Routing ==
12455 / 56 Delhi Sarai Rohilla–Bikaner Junction Superfast Express runs from Delhi Sarai Rohilla via Jind Junction, Dhuri Junction, Bathinda Junction, Sri Ganganagar Junction, Suratgarh Junction, Lalgarh Junction to Bikaner Junction.

This train is different from the 12458/57 Bikaner–Delhi Sarai Rohilla Superfast Express which is operated by North Western Railways and runs via Churu Junction utilising ICF coach.

== Traction ==
As the entire route is fully electrified, a Ghaziabad -based WAP-7 locomotive powers the train for its entire journey.

== Timings ==
12455 Delhi Sarai Rohilla–Bikaner Superfast Express leaves Delhi Sarai Rohilla on a daily basis and reaches Bikaner Junction the next day.

12456 Bikaner–Delhi Sarai Rohilla Superfast Express leaves Bikaner Junction on a daily basis and reaches Delhi Sarai Rohilla the next day.
