= Delhi Sarai Rohilla railway station =

Railway station in Delhi, India

Delhi Sarai Rohilla

General information
- Location: Sarai Rohilla, Delhi; India
- Coordinates: 28°39′47″N 77°11′11″E
- Elevation: 220.950 metres (724.90 ft)
- System: Indian Railway and Delhi Suburban Railway station
- Owner: Ministry of Railways (India)
- Operator: Indian Railways
- Lines: Delhi–Fazilka line Delhi–Jaipur line Delhi Azadpur loop Delhi Sarai Rohilla-Delhi Shahdara line
- Platforms: 5
- Tracks: 12
- Connections: Magenta Line Sarai Rohilla (upcoming)

Construction
- Structure type: At grade
- Parking: Available

Other information
- Station code: DEE
- Zone(s): Northern Railway
- Division(s): Delhi

History
- Opened: 1873; 153 years ago
- Rebuilt: 2013; 13 years ago
Route map
Location
- Location within Delhi

Delhi Sarai Rohilla (station code: DEE) is a railway station on the Indian Railways network, located 4 kilometres east of the Delhi Junction railway station. Managed by the Delhi Division of the Northern Railway, it serves as a stop for trains connecting Delhi to Haryana, Jammu and Kashmir, Punjab, Rajasthan, Karnataka, Gujarat, and Maharashtra. Over 20 trains, including the Duronto Express and AC trains, originate from this station.

== Major trains ==
The train which originates from Delhi Sarai Rohilla are :

● Ajmer–Delhi Sarai Rohilla Jan Shatabdi Express (12065/12066)

● Yesvantpur–Delhi Sarai Rohilla AC Duronto Express (12213/12214)

● Delhi Sarai Rohilla–Bandra Terminus Garib Rath Express (12215/12216)

● Delhi Sarai Rohilla–Jammu Tawi Duronto Express (12265/12266)

● Delhi Sarai Rohilla–Bikaner Superfast Express (Via Shri Ganganagar) (12455/12456)

● Bikaner–Delhi Sarai Rohilla Superfast Express (Via Churu) (12457/12458)

● Rajasthan Sampark Kranti Express (12463/12464)

● Jaipur–Delhi Sarai Rohilla AC Double Decker Express (12985/12986)

● Dhauladhar Express (14035/14036)

● Delhi Sarai Rohilla–Sikar Express (14713/14714)

● Indore–Delhi Sarai Rohilla Weekly Express (19337/19338)

● Chetak Express (20473/20474)

● Malani SF Express (20487/20488)

● Rajkot–Delhi Sarai Rohilla Weekly Superfast Express (20913/20914)

● Porbandar–Delhi Sarai Rohilla Superfast Express (20937/20938)

● Salasar Superfast Express (22421/22422)

● Delhi Sarai Rohilla–Bikaner Rajasthan Sampark Kranti Express (22463/22464)

● Bikaner–Delhi Sarai Rohilla Intercity Express (22471/22472)

● Jodhpur–Delhi Sarai Rohilla Superfast Express (22481/22482)

● Udaipur City–Delhi Sarai Rohilla Rajasthan Humsafar Express (22985/22986)

== Etymology ==
The term sarai refers to an inn or resting place for travelers. The station is named after the medieval village it was situated in, which itself was named after a sarai built by Ruhullah Khan, a nobleman in the Mughal court. The sarai was located on the busy road connecting Delhi and the pilgrimage town of Ajmer. Ruhullah Khan was one of the three sons of Khalil Ullah Khan, the governor of the Delhi province during the reign of Mughal Emperor Shah Jahan, and a distant relative of Empress Mumtaz Mahal. Over time, the name "Ruhullah" evolved into "Rohilla," influenced by the Rohillas, who ruled the region of Rohilkhand, situated to the northeast of Delhi, during the Mughal era.

== History ==
=== Background ===
Delhi Sarai Rohilla railway station was established in 1872 when the construction of the metre-gauge line from Delhi to Jaipur and Ajmer was underway. Located just outside the walled city of Shahjahanabad, it served as a focal point for metre-gauge trains traveling to Rewari, Punjab, Rajasthan, and Gujarat. The line from Delhi Junction to Sarai Rohilla was double-tracked, whereas the section from Sarai Rohilla to Rewari remained single until it was later upgraded. From Rewari, single tracks diverged in five directions.

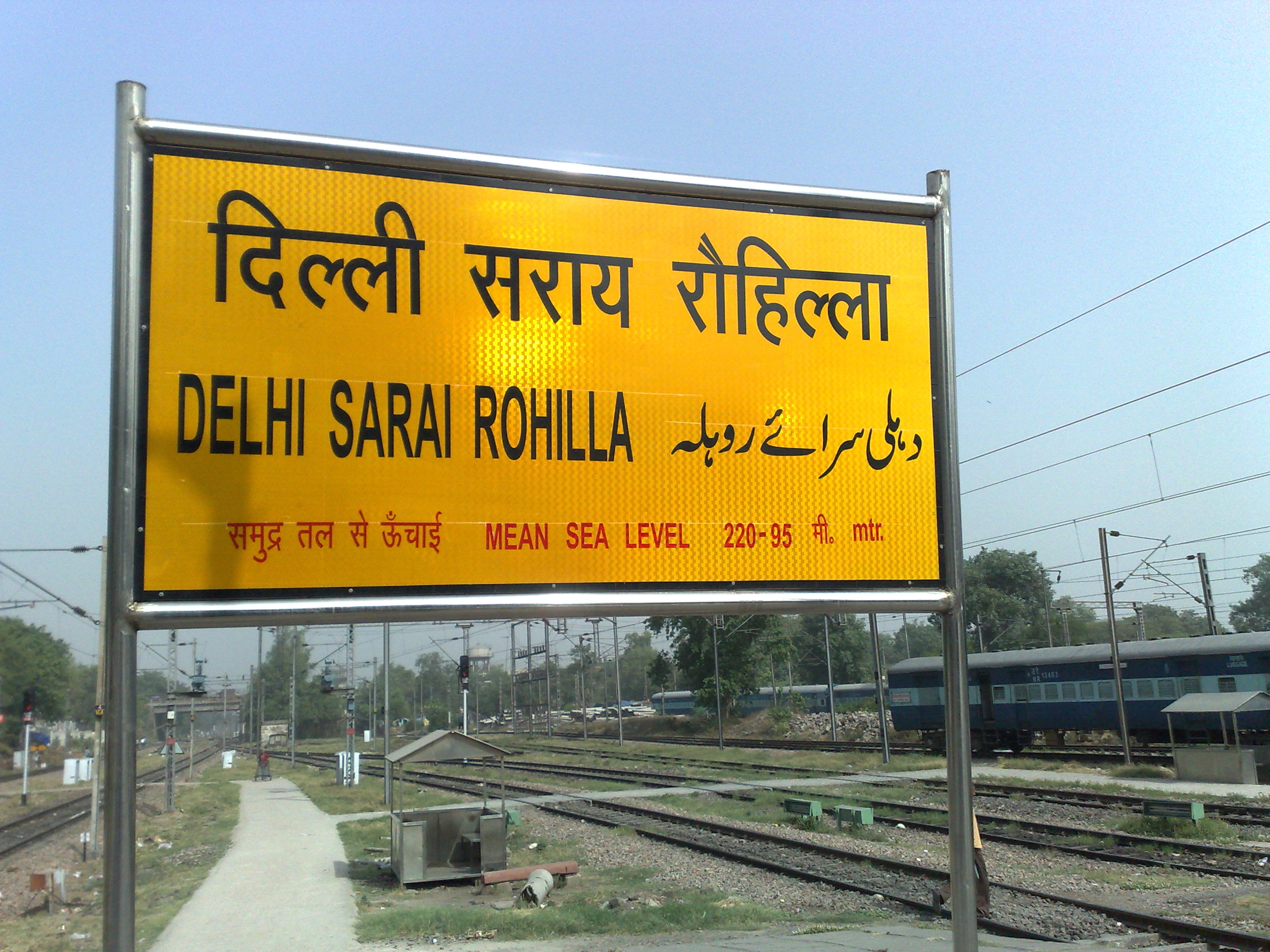
Platform signage

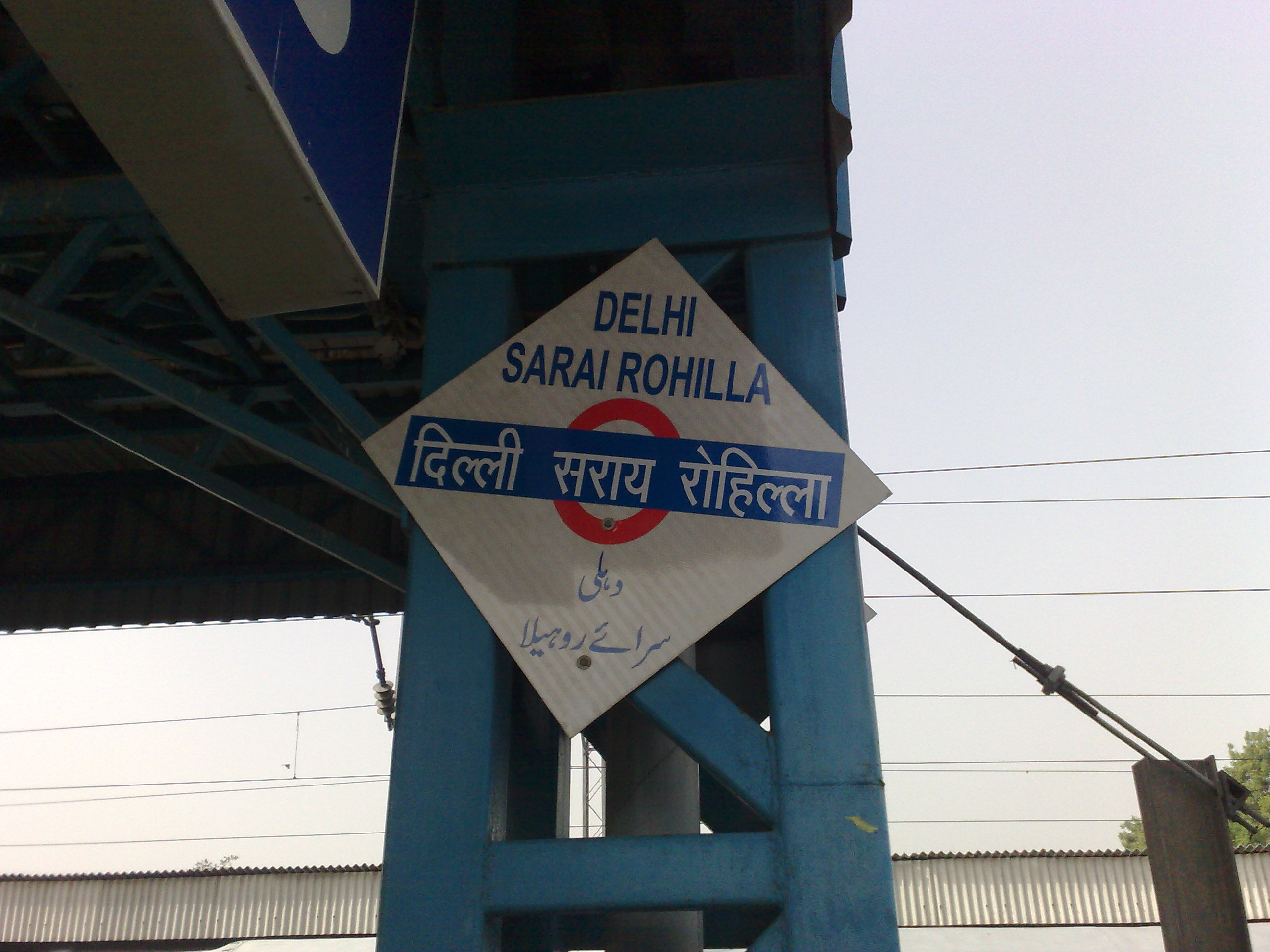
Platform board

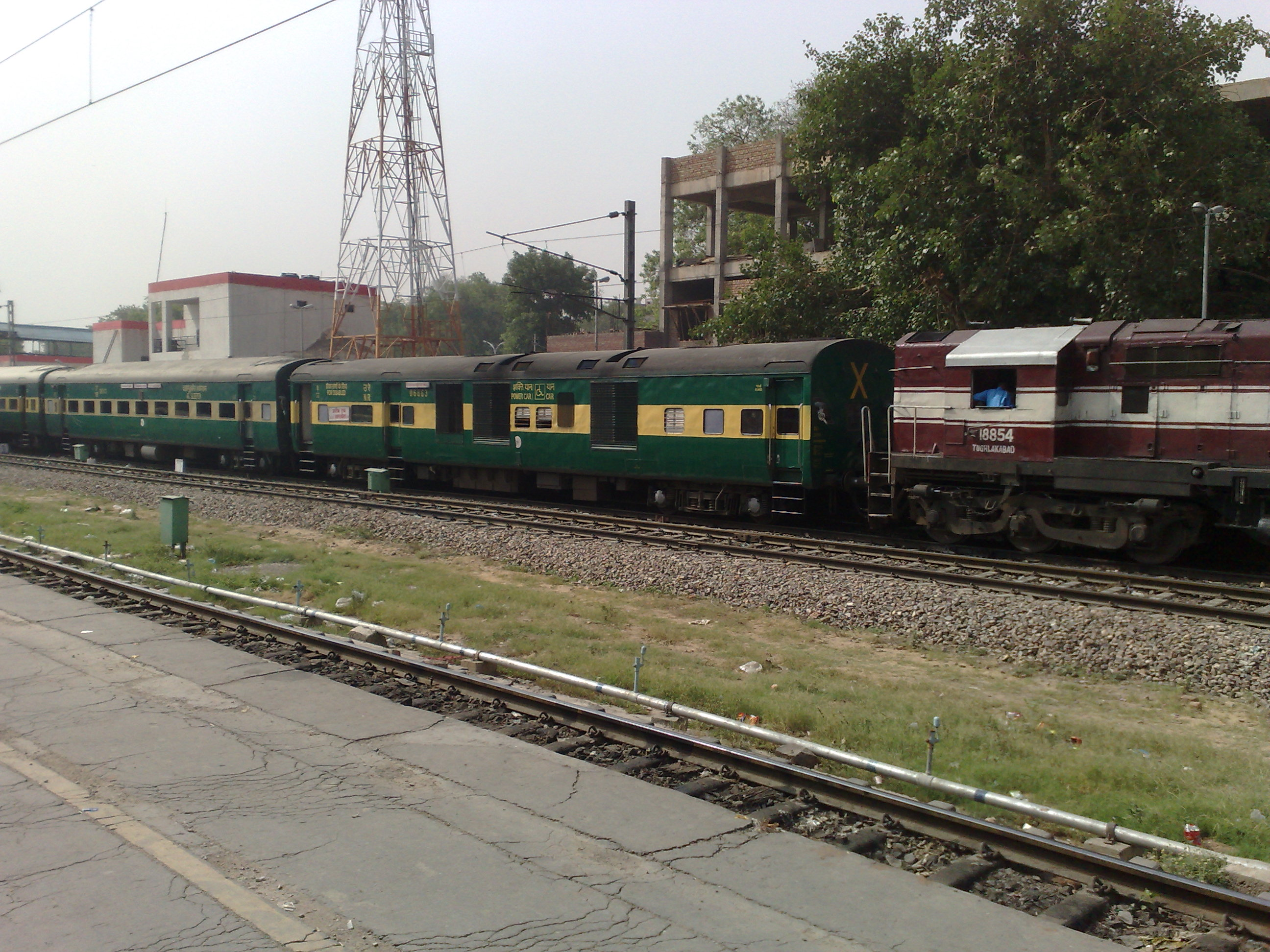
Delhi–Sarai Rohilla Bandra Terminus Garib Rath Express at platform 1

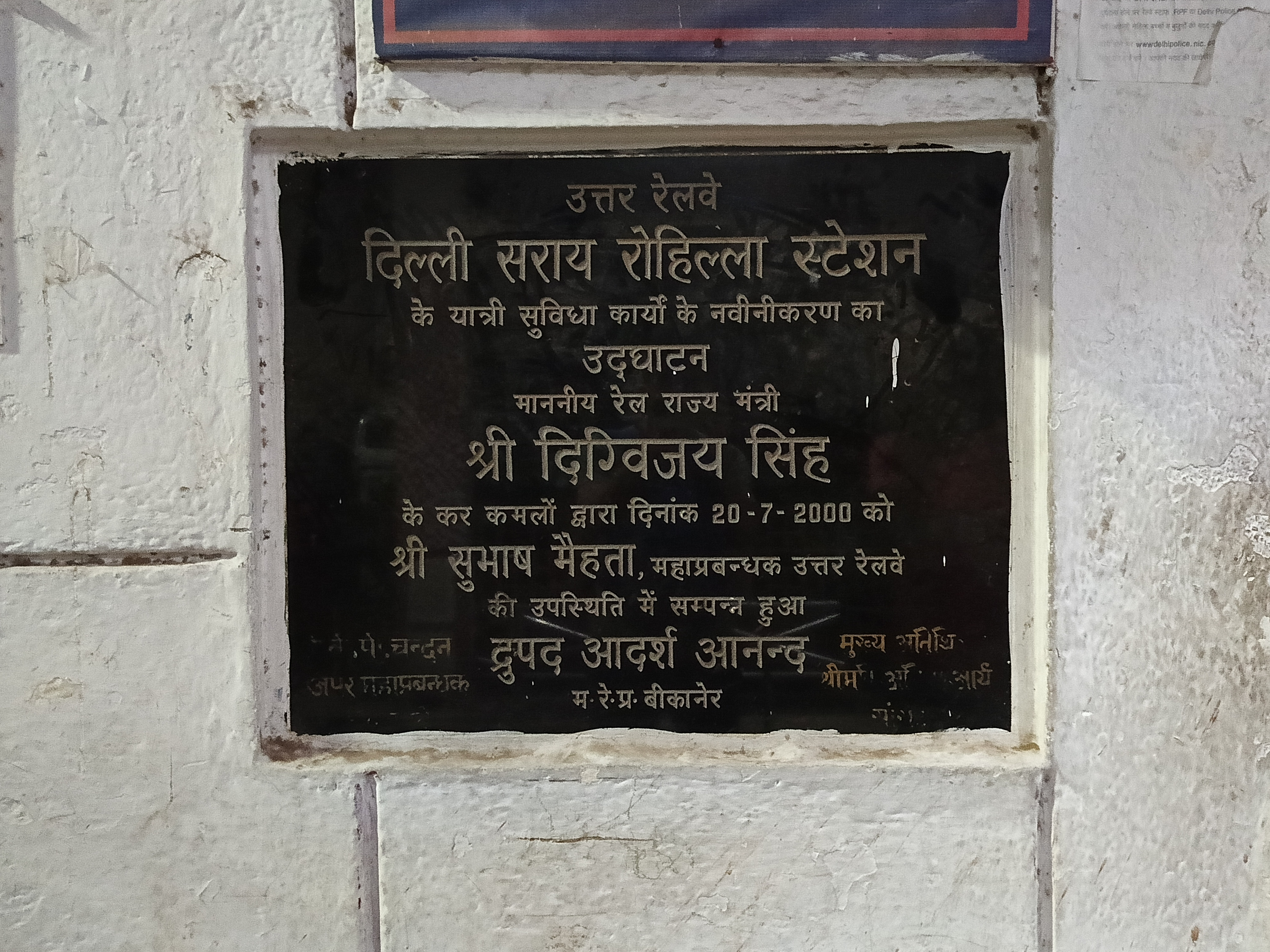
Inauguration plaque of the Sarai Rohilla station from 20th July 2000

=== Gauge conversion ===
The conversion of the metre-gauge to 5 ft 6 in (1,676 mm) broad gauge began in 1991. As part of the Ajmer–Delhi line conversion, one of the double metre-gauge tracks on the Delhi–Rewari line was converted to broad gauge in December 1994. Within a few years, both tracks from Sarai Rohilla to Delhi Junction were converted to broad gauge, eliminating metre-gauge train operations at Delhi station. Consequently, all metre-gauge trains were redirected to Sarai Rohilla, which was thereafter designated a terminus.

By September 2006, the second metre-gauge track from Sarai Rohilla to Rewari was converted to broad gauge, and metre-gauge train operations between Rewari and Sarai Rohilla ceased. However, the newly converted track was opened for public use only in October 2007.

== Infrastructure ==
Delhi Sarai Rohilla Terminal railway station has been developed as a terminus for trains originating from Delhi to destinations in Haryana, Punjab, Rajasthan, Gujarat, Madhya Pradesh,Mumbai and Bengaluru. The station features a ticket reservation center, three washing lines for train rakes, and five platforms. Additionally, two platforms from the adjacent Vivekanandpuri railway halt are connected to Sarai Rohilla by a common foot overbridge.

As part of the Smart Cities Mission, plans are in place to redevelop Delhi Sarai Rohilla Station. A memorandum of understanding was signed between the Ministry of Urban Development and Indian Railways in October 2016. The redevelopment will include the areas surrounding the station, with a focus on improving passenger amenities, enhancing accessibility, creating integrated public transport hubs, and optimizing land use.

Anand Vihar Terminal and Hazrat Nizamuddin are two additional major railway terminals in Delhi, serving as origin points for numerous regional and long-distance trains.

== See also ==
- Indian Railways
- New Delhi railway station
- Delhi Junction railway station
- Delhi Cantonment railway station
- Hazrat Nizamuddin railway station
- Anand Vihar Terminal railway station
- Shakurbasti railway station
- Delhi Suburban Railway
- Delhi Metro
- National Capital Region Transport Corporation
