= Degana Junction railway station =

Rail station in Rajasthan, India

DEGANA JUNCTION
- Indian Railways logo

General information
- Location: Degana, Nagaur district, Rajasthan; India
- Coordinates: 26.897316°N 74.317148°E
- Elevation: 340 metres (1,120 ft)
- System: Indian Railways station
- Owner: Indian Railways
- Operator: North Western Railway
- Lines: Fulera-Jaipur; Merta Road- Jodhpur line Ratangarh-Rewari line
- Platforms: 4
- Tracks: 5

Construction
- Structure type: Standard (on-ground station)
- Parking: Yes
- Cycle facilities: No

Other information
- Status: Functioning
- Station code: DNA
- Zone(s): North Western Railway
- Division(s): Jodhpur
Location
- Location within India Location within Rajasthan

Degana Junction railway station is a railway station in Nagaur district, Rajasthan. Its code is DNA. It serves Degana town. The station consists of four platforms. Passenger, Express, and Superfast trains halt here.

== Trains ==
The following trains halt at Degana Junction railway station in both directions:

- Kota–Shri Ganganagar Superfast Express
- Jhalawar City-Sri Ganganagar Superfast Express
- Delhi-Barmer Express
- Bikaner-Kolkata Pratap Express
- Howra-Barmer Express
- Bandra Terminus–Jammu Tawi Vivek Express
- Bhagat Ki Kothi–Bilaspur Express
- Bilaspur–Bikaner Express
- Barmer–Guwahati Express
- Bikaner–Guwahati Express
- Howrah–Jodhpur Express
- Jodhpur-Delhi Sarai Rohilla Rajasthan Sampark Kranti Express
- Bikaner-Delhi Sarai Rohilla Rajasthan Sampark Kranti Express
- Jodhpur–Delhi Sarai Rohilla Superfast Express
- Jodhpur-Delhi Mandore Express
- Jodhpur-Indore Ranthambore Express
- Jaipur–Jodhpur High Court Intercity Express
- Jodhpur- Varanasi City Marudhar Express
- Bhagat Ki Kothi–Mannargudi Weekly Express
- Puri–Jodhpur Express
- Jaisalmer-Jaipur Leelan Express
- Jodhpur-Delhi Sarai Rohilla Salasar Express
- Barmer- Jaipur Express
- Bikaner-Madurai Anuvrat AC Superfast Express
- Visakhapatnam–Bhagat Ki Kothi Express
- Bikaner–Puri Express
- Bhagat Ki Kothi–Kamakhya Express
- Barmer-Jammu Tawi Express
- Jaisalmer-Jammu Tawi Shalimar Express
- Jodhpur- Bhopal Express
- Jodhpur-Rewari Exp/Pass
- Jodhpur-Hisar Passenger
- Jaipur-Suratgarh Passenger
- Merta Road-Ratangarh Passenger
