= Ren railway station =

Railway station in Rajasthan, India

Ren

General information
- Location: Ren, Nagaur district, Rajasthan; India
- Coordinates: 26.788862°N 74.074901°E
- Elevation: 309 metres (1,014 ft)
- System: Indian Railways station
- Owner: Indian Railways
- Operator: North Western Railway
- Line: Merta Road–Degana line
- Platforms: 2
- Tracks: 2

Construction
- Structure type: Standard (on ground station)
- Parking: Yes

Other information
- Status: Functioning
- Station code: REN
- Zone(s): North Western Railway
- Division(s): Jodhpur
Location
- Location within India Location within Rajasthan

Ren railway station is a railway station in Nagaur district, Rajasthan. Its code is REN. It serves Ren village. The station consists of a single platform. Passenger, Express and Superfast trains halt here.
