= Nohar railway station =

Railway station in Rajasthan, India

Nohar

General information
- Location: Nohar, Hanumangarh district, Rajasthan; India
- Coordinates: 29.192233°N 74.774327°E
- Elevation: 196 metres (643 ft)
- System: Indian Railways station
- Owner: Indian Railways
- Operator: North Western Railway
- Line: Hanumangarh–Sadulpur line
- Platforms: 2
- Tracks: 2

Construction
- Structure type: Standard (on ground station)
- Parking: Yes

Other information
- Status: Active
- Station code: NHR
- Zone(s): North Western Railway
- Division(s): Bikaner
Location
- Location within India Location within Rajasthan

Nohar railway station is a railway station in Hanumangarh district, Rajasthan. Its code is NHR. It serves Nohar town. The station consists of 2 platforms. Passenger, Express, and Superfast trains halt here.

== Trains ==
The following trains halt at Nohar railway station in both directions:

- Amrapur Aravali Express
- Firozpur–Rameswaram Humsafar Express
- Sriganganagar tilak bridge express
- Sriganganagar jaipur special fare
- Jaipur bathinda passenger
- and many more passengers
