= Jodhpur–Delhi Sarai Rohilla Superfast Express =

Overview
- Service type: Superfast Express
- First service: 11 November 2011; 14 years ago
- Current operator: North Western Railway zone

Route
- Termini: Jodhpur Junction (JU); Delhi Sarai Rohilla (DEE)
- Stops: 17
- Distance travelled: 620 km (385 mi)
- Average journey time: 10h 20m
- Service frequency: Daily
- Train number: 22481/22482

On-board services
- Classes: AC 2 tier, AC 3 tier, Sleeper class, General Unreserved
- Seating arrangements: No
- Sleeping arrangements: Yes
- Catering facilities: On-board catering E-catering
- Observation facilities: LHB coach
- Entertainment facilities: No
- Baggage facilities: No
- Other facilities: Below the seats

Technical
- Rolling stock: 2
- Track gauge: 1,676 mm (5 ft 6 in)
- Operating speed: 60 km/h (37 mph), including halts

The Jodhpur–Delhi Sarai Rohilla Superfast Express is a Superfast Express train belonging to North Western Railway zone that runs between Delhi Sarai Rohilla and Jodhpur Junction in India. It is currently being operated with 22481/22482 train numbers on a daily basis.

== Service ==
The 22481/Jodhpur–Delhi Sarai Rohilla Superfast Express has an average speed of 60 km/h and covers 620 km in 10h 20m. The 22482/Delhi Sarai Rohilla–Jodhpur Superfast Express has an average speed of 58 km/h and covers 620 km in 10h 45m.

== Route and halts ==
The important halts of the train are:

- Jodhpur Junction
- Merta Road Junction
- Ren
- Degana Junction
- Sujangarh
- Ratangarh Junction
- Churu Junction
- Sadulpur Junction
- Loharu Junction
- Mahendragarh
- Rewari Junction
- Pataudi Road
- Gurgaon
- Delhi Cantonment
- Delhi Sarai Rohilla

== Coach composition ==
The train has standard lhb rakes with max speed of 110 kmph. The train consists of 18 coaches:

- 1 AC First Class
- 1 AC II Tier
- 4 AC III Tier
- 10 Sleeper coaches
- 6 General Unreserved
- 2 Seating cum Luggage Rake

== Traction ==
Both trains are hauled by a Bhagat Ki Kothi Loco Shed-based WDP-4 diesel locomotive from Jodhpur to Sarai Rohilla and vice versa.

== Rake sharing ==
No rake sharing. Two dedicated rakes

== See also ==
- Delhi Sarai Rohilla railway station
- Jodhpur Junction railway station
- Bhagat Ki Kothi–Ahmedabad Weekly Express
