= Rewari Junction railway station =

Railway station in Haryana, India

Rewari Junction
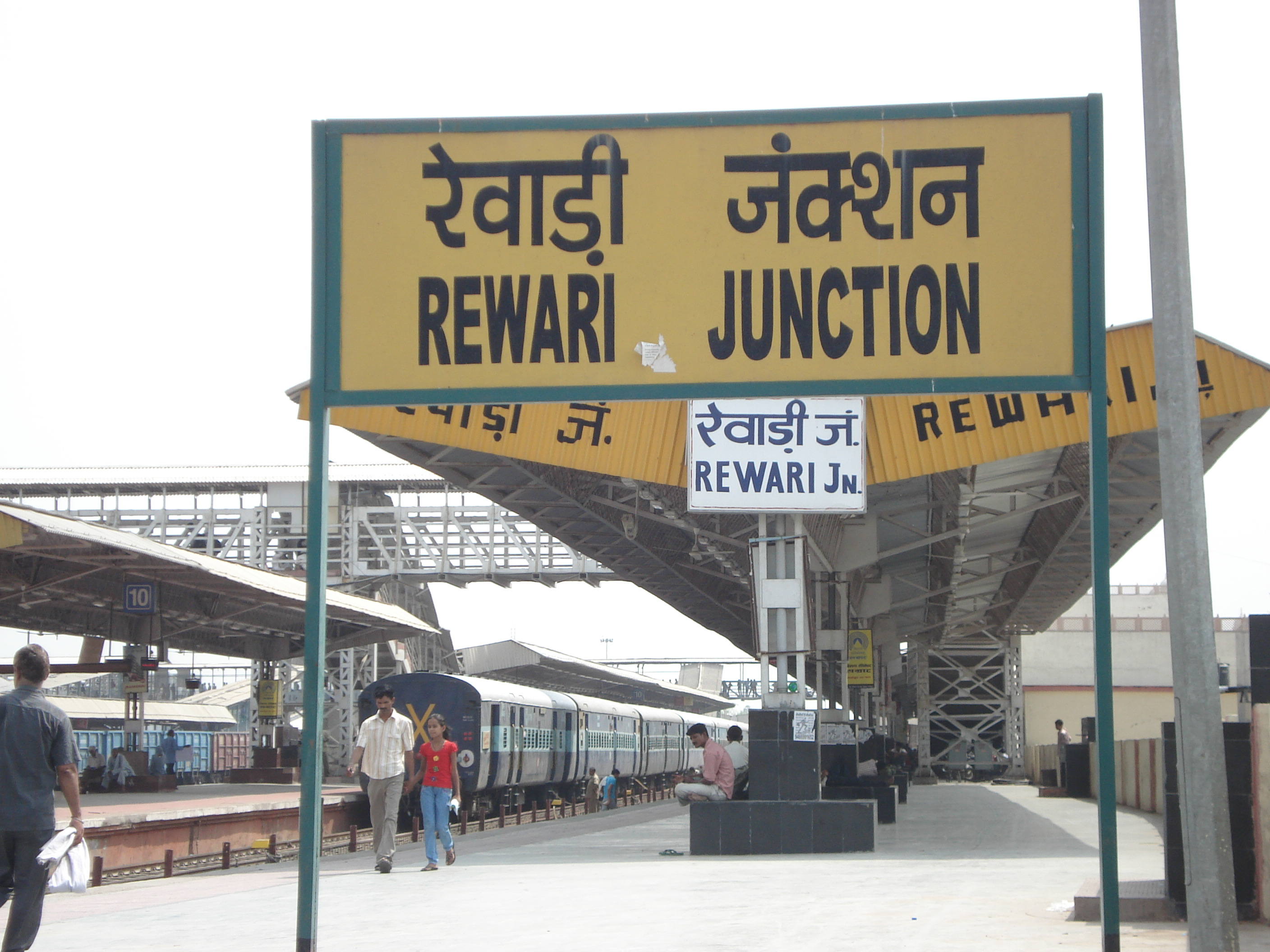
- The station in 2008

General information
- Location: Station Road, Rewari, Haryana; India
- Coordinates: 28°12′12″N 76°36′40″E
- Elevation: 246 metres (807 ft)
- System: Indian Railway and Delhi Suburban Railway station
- Owner: Indian Railways
- Operator: Indian Railways
- Lines: New Delhi–Ahmedabad main line, Jaipur–Rewari new railway line, Kota–Rewari railway line, Bathinda–Rewari line, Rewari–Rohtak line, Bikaner–Rewari line, Ringus–Rewari line
- Platforms: 8
- Tracks: 14
- Bus routes: 6

Construction
- Structure type: Intermediate Junction
- Parking: Available(paid)

Other information
- Status: Functional
- Station code: RE
- Zone(s): North Western Railway zone
- Division(s): Jaipur

History
- Opened: 1873
- Rebuilt: 2009–11

Passengers
- 35000 per day
Location
- Location within Haryana Location within India

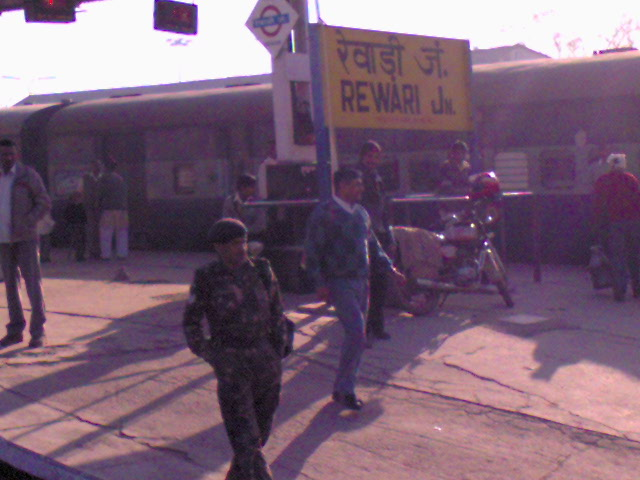
Rewari railway junction's earlier signboard

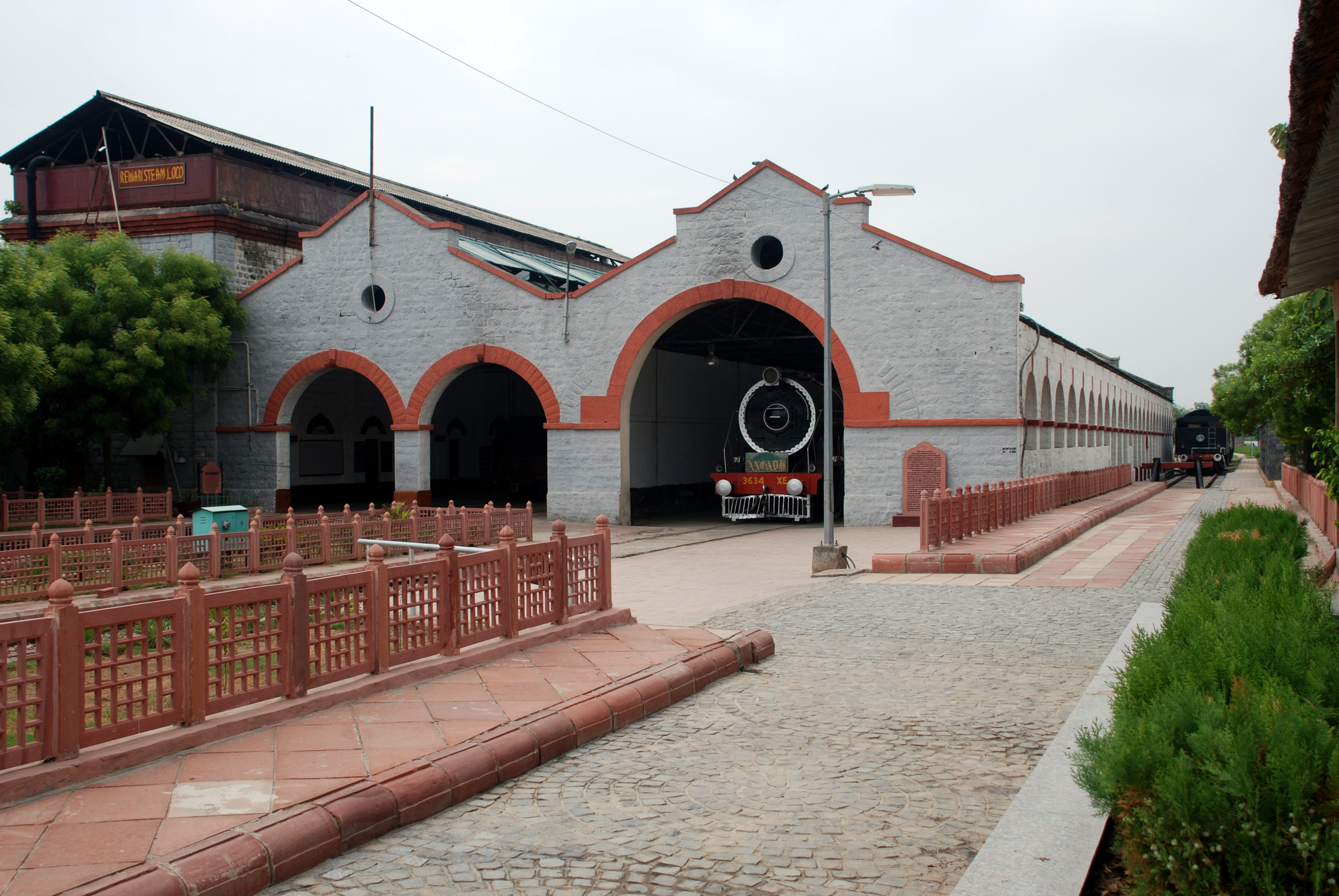
Rewari Heritage Steam Locomotive Museum

Rewari Junction railway station (station code: RE) is a major railway station of the Indian Railways serving the city of Rewari in the Indian state of Haryana. It is in the Jaipur Division of the North Western Railway zone and 7 railway lines branch out from this railway station. It will be integrated with the Rewari RRTS station of Delhi–Alwar RRTS.

Rewari Railway Heritage Museum, built in 1893 is the only surviving steam loco shed in India and houses some of India's last surviving steam locomotives including world's oldest working engine and one of national treasure (cultural artifacts) of India Fairy Queen, is known for heritage tourism and for shooting of several movies.

== History ==
In 1873, Rewari railway station was built on 82.3 kilometres (51.1 mi) long first commercial 1,000 mm (3 ft 3 3/8 in) metre-gauge track in India from Delhi to Rewari by Rajputana State Railway. A 41.4 kilometres (25.7 mi) long segment of the railway line had been laid a year earlier from Delhi to Garhi Harsaru that catered to existing flourishing salt production works (from underground brine) at Farrukhnagar, 13.8 kilometres (8.6 mi) to its west.

In 1874, 1875 and 1881, the railway line was extended 135.8 kilometres (84.4 mi) from Rewari to Alwar-Bandikui, further 225.2 kilometres (139.9 mi) to Jaipur-Ajmer, and eventually another 492 kilometres (306 mi) to Ahmedabad in Gujarat respectively by Rajputana–Malwa Railway.

In 1884, Rewari became a railway junction when, a 300.65 kilometres (186.82 mi)-long metre-gauge railway line to Bhatinda was completed by Rajputana–Malwa Railway

In 1986, 379 kilometres (235 mi) long line to Bikaner via Kanina, Loharu, Sadulpur, Churu & Ratangarh was laid.).

In 1905, 216 kilometres (134 mi) long line to Phulera via Narnaul, Neem-Ka-Thana and Ringas was laid. Eventually five metre-gauge tracks branched out from Rewari. All metre-gauge trains starting from (and terminating at) Delhi railway junction (station code DLI) to Punjab, Rajputana, Saurashtra, Kutch and north Gujarat regions passed through Rewari station. The management of Rajputana–Malwa Railways (and Rewari railway station) was transferred to Bombay, Baroda and Central India Railway (BBCI) in 1889. BBCI became Western Railway in 1951.

In 1952, Delhi–Rewari–Bikaner railway line were transferred to Bikaner Division of newly formed Northern Railway zone in 1952 while Rewari–Jaipur and Rewari–Ringas–Phulera sections remained in Western Railway.

In 1992, Delhi–Rewari railway line had double 1,000 mm (3 ft 3 3/8 in) metre gauge and one of the tracks was converted to 5 ft 6 in (1,676 mm) broad gauge as a part of conversion of Ajmer–Delhi line.

In 1993, Rewari–Bhatinda track was converted to broad gauge.

In 1994, Rewari–Jaipur–Ajmer track was converted to broad gauge. In May 1997, broad-gauge trains started running from Ahmedabad to Delhi via Rewari. Within a few years, both the tracks from Sarai Rohilla to Delhi railway junction were converted to broad gauge and all metre-gauge trains stopped operating from Delhi Junction. As a result of this, all metre-gauge trains to Rewari and beyond terminated at and started from Sarai Rohilla which became a railway terminus.

By September 2004, the second metre-gauge track from Sarai Rohilla to Rewari was also converted to broad gauge and all metre-gauge trains stopped operating between Rewari and Sarai Rohilla (though the converted track was "officially" dedicated to the nation by politicians only in October 2006).

By 2009, all metre-gauge railway tracks from Rewari were converted to broad gauge.

Until 2010, Rewari was the world's oldest and largest commercial metre-gauge railway junction.

In 2008, 361 kilometres (224 mi) long Rewari–Ajmer railway line via Bandikui and Jaipur was double tracked. In 2021, Rewari-Ajmer-Palanpur-Ahmedabad, Rewari-Hisar, and Rewari-Ludhiana lines were doubled.

In 2017, Alwar-Rewari–Hisar and Rewari–Narnaul–Ringas–Phulera railway tracks were electrified.

In 2020, Rewari–Ajmer railway track was electrified. Later, Rewari–Ringas–Ajmer–Palanpur 654 kilometres (406 mi) long track and Rewari–Ringas–Ajmer–Palanpur–Mehsana railway track were also electrified.

In 2004–06, facilities were upgraded via Rewari for running double-stack goods trains from Rewari to Bombay, Kandla and other ports in western India from Delhi and northern states/union territories of Haryana, Punjab, Himachal Pradesh and Jammu and Kashmir. Some private logistics operators have built container storage yards north of Rewari near Garhi Harsaru (south of Gurgaon) for this purpose.

In 2025-26, Rewari station underwent ₹12 crore upgrade with improved station building facade, new lifts and escalators, renovated waiting rooms and toilets, new coach guidance system, separate arrival and departure gates, enhanced parking, and an attractive boundary wall.

== Facilities ==
Rewari railway station has all major facilities like high-level platforms, waiting rooms, restaurants, computerised ticket reservation, bookshop and retiring rooms for sleeping. On conversion of metre-gauge tracks to broad gauge, the station yard was remodelled and the tracks and platforms were rearranged to provide 8 platforms in 2009–10; low-level metre-gauge platforms were raised higher. Some heritage buildings that were more than 100 years old were demolished to lay new railway lines and build high-level platforms. New buildings have been constructed.

== Train services ==
Rewari railway junction station is located 82.3 kilometres (51.1 mi) southwest of old Delhi and 75.6 kilometres (47.0 mi) southwest of the nearest large airport is located at New Delhi.

=== Rail lines ===
1,676 mm (5 ft 6 in) broad-gauge tracks branch out from Rewari towards

1. Delhi 82.3 kilometres (51.1 mi) .
2. Ajmer via Alwar, Bandikui and Jaipur 361 kilometres (224 mi)
3. Phulera via Narnaul, Neem-Ka-Thana and Ringas 216 kilometres (134 mi)
4. Bikaner via Loharu, Sadulpur, Churu & Ratangarh 379 kilometres (235 mi)
5. Bhatinda via Charkhi Dadri, Bhiwani and Hisar 300.65 kilometres (186.82 mi)
6. Rohtak via Jhajjar 72.9 kilometres (45.3 mi)(constructed in 2008–2012 and commissioned in January 2013)
7. Rewari-Asaoti as a part of the Western Dedicated Freight Corridor

=== Trains ===
The following is a list of a few trains stopping at Rewari railway station.

Train no.	Train name	Zone	From	To	Scheduled dep
12915	Ashram Express	WR	Ahmedabad/ADI	Delhi/DLI	08:35
12372	Jaisalmer–Howrah Express	ER	Jaisalmer/JSM	Howrah/HWH	11:50
22452	Mumbai–Bandra–Chandigarh Exp	NR	Bandra/BDTS	Chandigarh/CDG	10:30
19602	New Jalpaiguri–Ajmer Exp	NWR	New Jalpaiguri/NJP	Ajmer/AII	15:10
19565	Uttaranchal Exp	WR	Okha/OKHA	Dehradun/DDN	07:45
12413	Pooja Exp	NR	Ajmer/AII	Jammu/JAT	20:18

== See also ==
- Transport in Delhi
- Indian Railways stations
  - Delhi Sarai Rohilla
  - Delhi Junction
  - New Delhi
  - Hazrat Nizamuddin
