= Bikaner Junction railway station =

Railway station in Rajasthan, India

Bikaner Junction
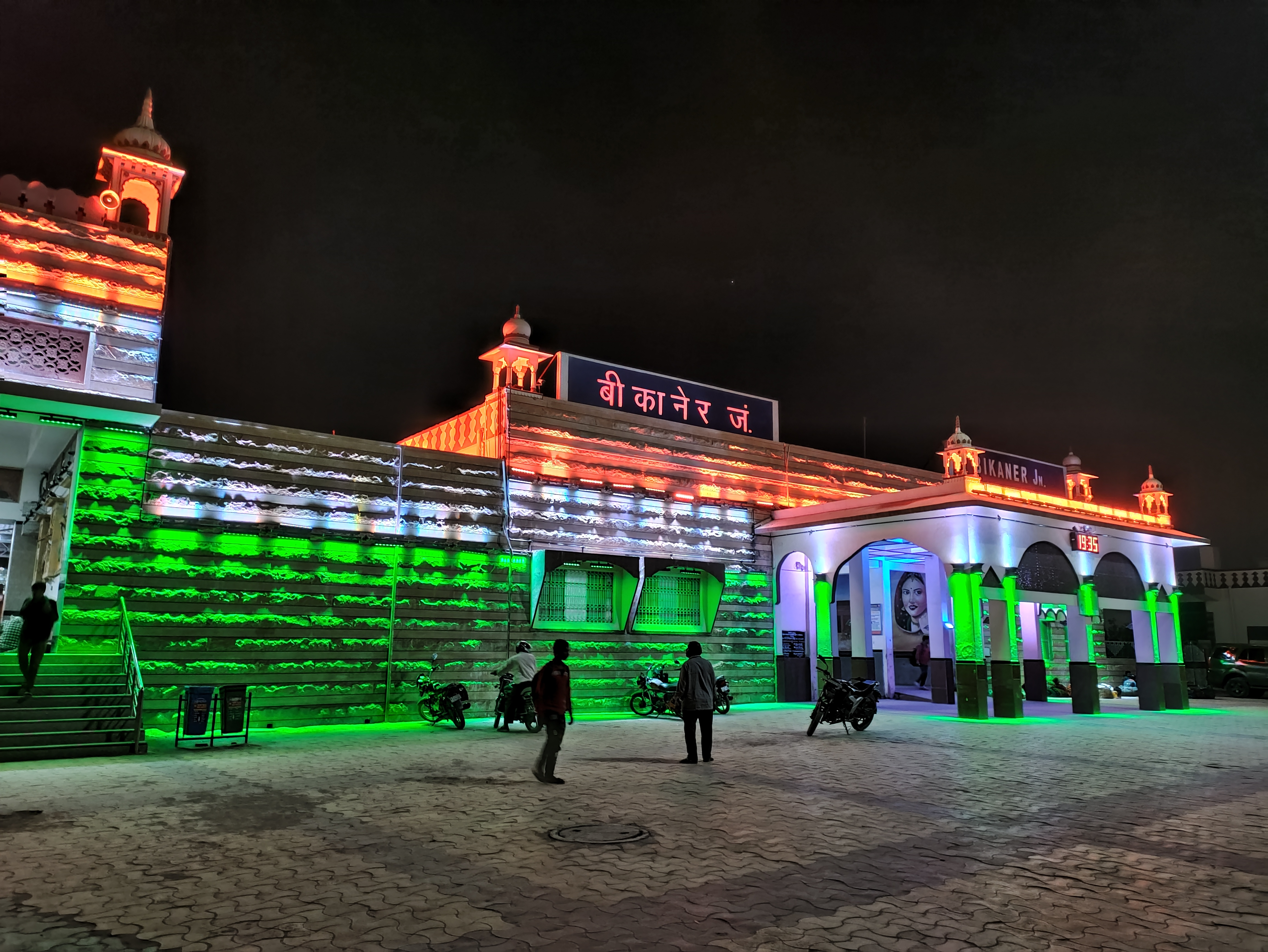
- Bikaner Junction

General information
- Location: Bikaner, Bikaner district Rajasthan; India
- Coordinates: 28°00′53″N 73°18′57″E
- Elevation: 234.696 metres (770.00 ft)
- System: Indian Railways junction station
- Owner: Indian Railways
- Operator: North Western Railways
- Lines: Jodhpur–Bathinda line, Bikaner–Rewari line
- Platforms: 6
- Tracks: 8 5 ft 6 in (1,676 mm) broad gauge

Construction
- Structure type: Standard on ground
- Parking: Yes
- Cycle facilities: No

Other information
- Status: Functioning
- Station code: BKN
- Zone(s): North Western Railway zone
- Division(s): Bikaner

History
- Opened: 1891
Location
- Location within Rajasthan Location within India

Bikaner railway station is located in Bikaner district in the Indian state of Rajasthan. It serves Bikaner. Bikaner is headquarters of Bikaner railway division.

== The railway station ==
Bikaner railway station is at an elevation of 226 metres (741 ft) and was assigned the code – BKN.

Bikaner is served by more than 21 pairs of trains each day with multiple daily connections to Delhi, Ahmedabad, Vadodara, Surat, Mumbai and Chandigarh. Within Rajasthan, there are also multiple daily trains available for Jodhpur, Jaipur, Nagaur, Ratangarh, Churu, Barmer, and Jaisalamer. There are also daily trains to Kota.

Daily connections to Pathankot, Amritsar, Jammu, Kalka, Haridwar, Agra, Kanpur, Lucknow, Allahabad, Varanasi, Patna, Durgapur, Kolkata, Guwahati and Dibrugarh are also available.

Most other major Indian cities such as Ujjain, Pune, Miraj, Nagpur, Bengaluru, Hyderabad, Vijayawada, Chennai, Madurai, Coimbatore, cochin, Trivandrum, Goa, Puri, Bhubaneswar, Sambalpur, Raipur, Bilaspur and Bhopal are connected via weekly, biweekly or tri-weekly trains.

== History ==
Bikaner railway station was constructed in 1891 with a Rs. 3,46,000 donation by Rai Bahadur Dewan Bahadur Sir Kasturchand Daga, a known trader from the city.

In 1889, the two states of Jodhpur and Bikaner formed the Jodhpur–Bikaner Railway to promote railway development jointly within the Rajputana Agency. In 1891 the 1,000 mm (3 ft 3 3/8 in)-wide metre-gauge Jodhpur–Bikaner line was opened. In 1901–02, the metre-gauge line was extended to Bathinda.

== Gauge conversions ==
The Jodhpur–Bikaner track, along with the link to Phulera, had been taken in/before 1991 for conversion to 5 ft 6 in (1,676 mm) broad gauge. According to a Press Information Bureau release issued in 2008, the Jodhpur–Merta City–Bikaner–Bathinda line was broad gauge.

The Bikaner–Rewari line was converted to broad gauge during the period 2008–2011.

== Workshop ==
The Bikaner (Lalgarh) workshop was set up in 1926. It carries out periodic overhauling of metre gauge coaches and wagons.

== Museum ==
Bikaner Heritage Rail Museum at Bikaner displays items related to the Jodhpur and Bikaner Railway era. It was opened in 2012. Turban Museum in platform one open on 2021. Displays longest turban and smallest turban in world made by a Bikaner artist Pawan vyas.

Preceding station	Indian Railways	Following station
Uramsar towards ?	North Western Railway zone Jodhpur–Bathinda line	Lalgarh towards ?
Terminus	North Western Railway zone Bikaner–Rewari line	Bikaner East towards ?
