= Bikaner railway division =

Railway division of India

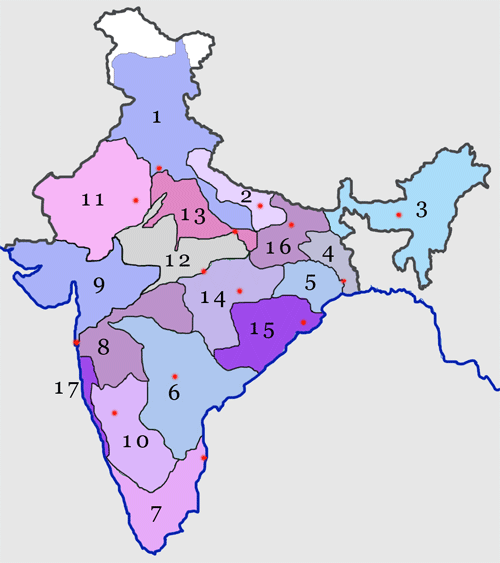
- 11-North Western Railway

Overview
- Headquarters: Bikaner Junction railway station
- Locale: Rajasthan
- Dates of operation: 1924; 102 years ago–
- Predecessor: Northern Railway zone

Technical
- Track gauge: Mixed

Other
- Website: NWR official website

Bikaner railway division is one of the four railway divisions under the jurisdiction of North Western Railway zone of the Indian Railways. This railway division was formed on 5 November 1951 and its headquarter is located at Bikaner in the state of Rajasthan of India.

Jaipur railway division, Ajmer railway division and Jodhpur railway division are the other three railway divisions under NWR Zone headquartered at Jaipur. This division is one of the key enabler of the Delhi Mumbai Industrial Corridor Project by virtue of running parts of the railways 1,500 km long network of Western Dedicated Freight Corridor.

== History ==
The Bikaner railway division was formed in 1924, though its origin dates back to early 1880.

In 1882, a 1,000 mm (3 ft 3 3/8 in) wide metre gauge line from Marwar Junction to Pali was built by the Rajputana Railway. It was extended to Luni in 1884 and Jodhpur on 9 March 1885. New Jodhpur Railway was later combined with Bikaner Railway to form Jodhpur-Bikaner Railway in 1889. Later in 1900, Jodhpur–Bikaner line combined with Jodhpur-Hyderabad Railway (some part of this railway is in Pakistan) leading to connection with Hyderabad of Sindh Province. Later in 1924 Jodhpur and Bikaner Railways worked as independent Railways. After Independence, a part of Jodhpur Railway went to West Pakistan. In 1889, the Bikaner Princely State and Jodhpur Princely State started constructing the Jodhpur–Bikaner Railway within the Rajputana Agency. In 1891, the 1,000 mm (3 ft 3 3/8 in) wide metre gauge Jodhpur–Bikaner line was commissioned under the Rajputana-Malwa Railway, Jodhpur-Merta Road section was commissioned on 8 April, the Merta Road-Nagaur section on 16 October, and the Nagaur-Bikaner section on 9 December. The Jodhpur–Bikaner line was extended to Bathinda in 1901–02 to connect it with the metre gauge section of the Bombay, Baroda and Central India Railway and the meter gauge of North Western Railway Delhi–Fazilka line via Hanumangarh. In 1926, the workshop at Bikaner (Lalgarh) was set up to carry out periodic overhauling of metre gauge coaches and wagons. Sometime around or prior to 1991, the construction work for the conversion from meter gauge to 5 ft 6 in (1,676 mm) broad gauge of the Jodhpur–Bikaner line, along with the link to Phulera, were started, and it was already functioning as broad gauge Jodhpur–Merta City–Bikaner–Bathinda line by 2008. In 2012, the Bikaner Heritage Rail Museum was opened at Bikaner to displays items related to the Jodhpur and Bikaner Railway.

In 2009, the metre gauge Hisar–Sadulpur line was converted to broad gauge.

Between 2008 and 2011, the Bikaner–Rewari line was converted to broad gauge.

In 1884, The Rajputana-Malwa Railway extended the 1,000 mm (3 ft 3 3/8 in) wide metre gauge Delhi-Rewari section of Delhi–Fazilka line to Bathinda, which was The Southern Punjab Railway Co. opened the Delhi-Bathinda-Samasatta line in 1897. The line passed through Muktasar and Fazilka tehsils and provided direct connection through Samma Satta (now in Pakistan) to Karachi.

In 2013, the new broad gauge electrified Rewari-Rohtak line was constructed.

== Rail transport infrastructure ==
The division has the following types of locomotive engines: (Legends: W - broad gauge, D - diesel, G - goods, M - mixed, P - passenger)

- Hisar Junction railway station: washing shed

== Medical Facilities ==
For the employees and their families, the division also has the following healthcare facilities:

- Zonal Hospitals
  - Jaipur Zonal Railway Hospital near Jaipur Junction railway station
- Divisional Hospitals
  - Bikaner Divisional Railway Hospital near Bikaner Junction railway station
- Sub-Divisional Hospitals
  - Rewari Sub-Divisional Railway Hospital near Rewari railway station (Bikaner division)
- Health Units, several (total 29 across the whole division, including 3 other zones)
- First Aid Posts, unknown (no more than a total of two across the whole zone)

== Training ==
The division has following training institutes:

1. Divisional Training Centre(Engineering), Bandikui, Bikaner
2. Area Training Centre, Bandikui, Bikaner
3. Divisional Training Centre(Traffic, C&W, Civil), Lalgarh, Bikaner
4. Basic Training Centre, Bikaner
5. Railway Police Force (RPF) Training Centre, Bandikui, Bikaner

== Route and Track Length ==
- North Western Railway zone
  - Route km: broad gauge 2,575.03 kilometres (1,600.05 mi), metre gauge 2,874.23 kilometres (1,785.96 mi), total 5,449.29 kilometres (3,386.03 mi)
  - Track km: broad gauge 6,696.36 kilometres (4,160.93 mi), metre gauge 733.44 kilometres (455.74 mi), total 7,329.80 kilometres (4,554.53 mi)
  - Bikaner railway division: covers Rajasthan and parts of Railway in Haryana
    - Route km: broad gauge 1,730.96 kilometres (1,075.57 mi), metre gauge 48.76 kilometres (30.30 mi), total 1,779.72 kilometres (1,105.87 mi)
    - Track km: broad gauge 2,182.31 kilometres (1,356.02 mi), metre gauge 51.17 kilometres (31.80 mi), total 2,233.58 kilometres (1,387.88 mi)

== Network ==
The division has ≈14,000 employees handling 142 trains across 198 stations (14 with Computerized Passenger Reservation System). The quantum of traffic is equally split between goods and passenger segment, with food grains, china clay and gypsum being the main outbound goods traffic.

The network of this division covers the following states:

- Rajasthan: Dhundhar region, Bikaner region and north Rajasthan
- Haryana: western and southern triangular half of Haryana, up to and below the Sirsa-Hisar-Rewari diagonal.
- Punjab: A very small upward pointing triangular spur of the network in the south west corner of Punjab.

The network consists of the following lines:

1. Jodhpur–Bathinda line via Hanumangarh,
2. Jakhal-Hisar line (to Ludhiana via Sangrur) and Hisar-sadalpur line (to Bikaner)
3. Rewri-Sadulpur-Hanumangarh line
4. Suratgarh-Sarupsar-Shri Ganganagar loop line
5. Salemgrah-Anupgarh line
6. Ratangarh-Sardarshahr line
7. Delhi–Fazilka line, from Rewari to Dabwali section only
8. Rewari-Rohtak line
9. Rohtak-Bhiwani line
10. Shri Ganganagar–Sadulpur line via Sidhmukh railway station, Tehsil bhadra

The Western Dedicated Freight Corridor passes through Rewari.

== List of railway stations and towns ==
The list includes the stations under the Bikaner railway division and their station category.

Category of station	No. of stations	Names of stations
A-1 Category	0	-
A Category	7	Bikaner Junction, Bhiwani, Hanumangarh Junction, Hisar Junction, Lalgarh Junction, Sri Ganganagar Junction, Suratgarh Junction, Sadulpur Junction
B Category	5	Mandi Dabwali, Shri karanpur, Kesrisingh pur, Gajsinghpur, Raisingh Nagar.
C Category (Suburban station)	-	-
D Category	1	Prithviraj pura
E Category	-	-
F Category; Halt Station	-	-
Total	-	-

Stations closed for Passengers -
