= Bhagat Ki Kothi–Kamakhya Express =

Train in India

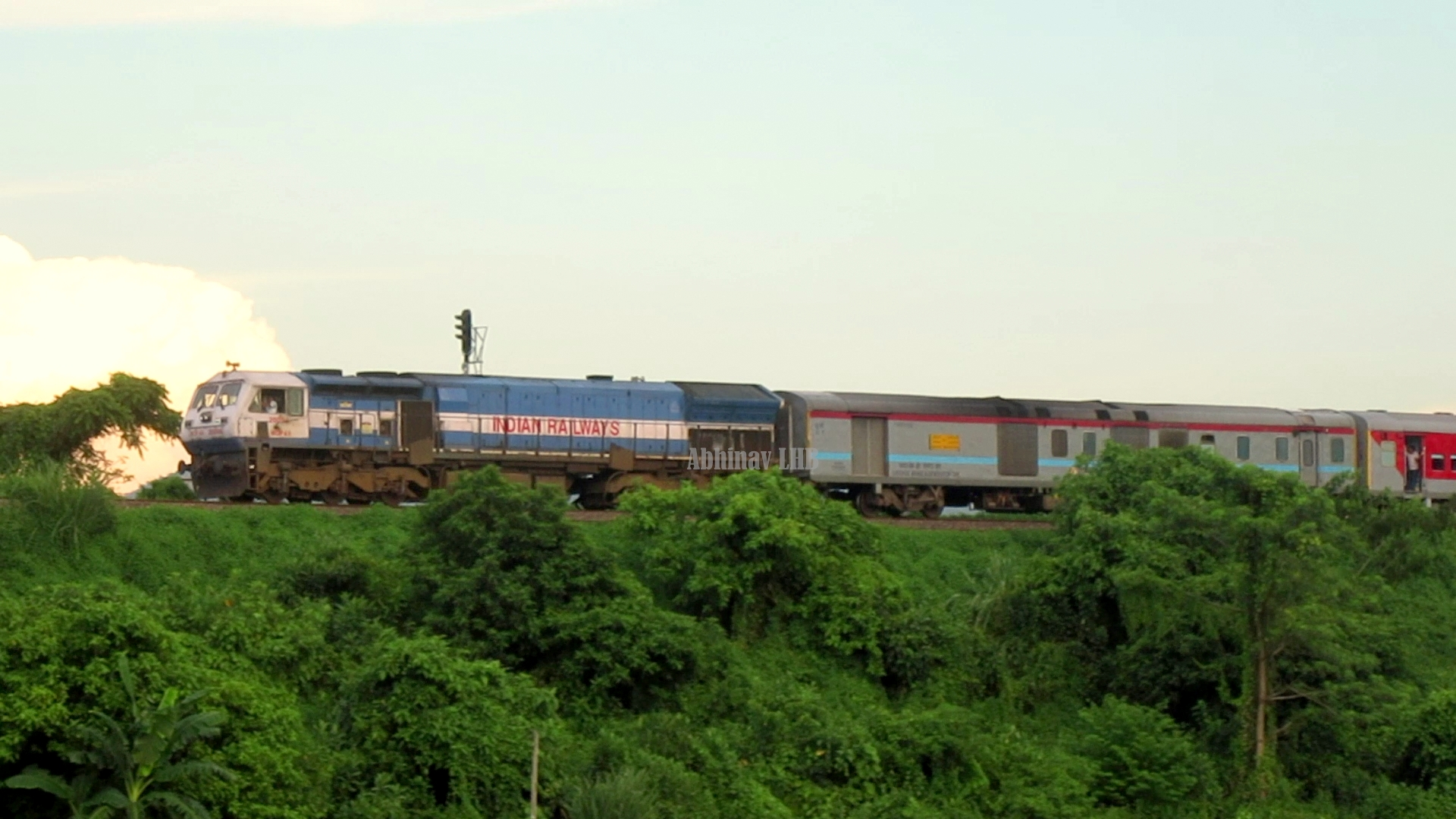
- Kamakhya–Bhagat Ki Kothi Express with a BGKT-based WDP-4 diesel locomotive.

Overview
- Service type: Express
- First service: 8 March 2016; 10 years ago
- Current operator: Northeast Frontier Railway

Route
- Termini: Bhagat Ki Kothi (BGKT); Kamakhya (KYQ)
- Stops: 43
- Distance travelled: 2,543 km (1,580 mi)
- Average journey time: 55 hours 35 minutes
- Service frequency: Weekly
- Train number: 15623 / 15624

On-board services
- Classes: AC 2 Tier, AC 3 Tier, Sleeper Class, General Unreserved
- Seating arrangements: No
- Sleeping arrangements: Yes
- Catering facilities: On-board catering, E-catering
- Observation facilities: Large windows
- Baggage facilities: Available
- Other facilities: Below the seats

Technical
- Rolling stock: LHB coach
- Track gauge: 1,676 mm (5 ft 6 in)
- Operating speed: 46 km/h (29 mph) average including halts.

The 15623 / 15624 Bhagat Ki Kothi–Kamakhya Express is an express train of the Indian Railways connecting Bhagat Ki Kothi, Jodhpur, Rajasthan and Kamakhya Junction, Guwahati, Assam. All the coaches are LHB coach. It is currently being operated with 15623/15624 train numbers on once a week basis.

== Service ==
The 15623/Bhagat Ki Kothi–Kamakhya Express has an average speed of 46 km/h and covers 2543 km in 55 hrs 35 mins. 15624/Kamakhya–Bhagat Ki Kothi Weekly Express has an average speed of 48 km/h and covers 2543 km in 52 hrs 45 mins.

== Route and halts ==
The important halts of the train are :

RAJASTHAN

- Bhagat Ki Kothi
- Jodhpur Junction
- Merta Road Junction
- Ratangarh Junction
- Churu Junction
- Sadulpur Junction

HARYANA

- Loharu Junction
- Rewari Junction
- Gurgaon

DELHI

- Delhi Junction

UTTAR PRADESH

- Ghaziabad Junction
- Moradabad Junction
- Bareilly Junction
- Lucknow Charbagh
- Ayodhya Junction
- Varanasi Junction
- Pt. Deen Dayal Upadhyaya Junction

BIHAR

- Patna Junction
- Barauni Junction
- Begusarai
- Khagaria Junction
- Katihar Junction
- Kishanganj

WEST BENGAL

- New Jalpaiguri (Siliguri)
- New Cooch Behar
- New Alipurduar

ASSAM

- Kokrajhar
- New Bongaigaon Junction
- Barpeta Road
- Rangiya Junction
- Kamakhya Junction

== Traction ==
As the route is fully electrified, it is hauled by a Bhagat Ki Kothi Diesel Loco Shed-based WAP-7 electric locomotive from Bhagat Ki Kothi to Kamakhya and vice versa.

== Coach composition ==
The train consists of 18 coaches:

- 2 AC II Tier
- 6 AC III Tier
- 1 AC 1st Class
- 7 Sleeper coaches
- 4 General
- 2 Second-class Luggage/parcel van

== Timing ==
- 15623 – Leaves Bhagat Ki Kothi (Rajasthan) every Tuesday and reaches Kamakhya Junction (Assam) Thursday at 23:05 hrs IST
- 15624 – leaves Kamakhya Junction (Assam) every Friday at 15:15 hrs and reaches Bhagat Ki Kothi (Rajasthan) Sunday at 22:0 hrs IST

== See also ==
- Barmer–Guwahati Express
