= Churu Junction railway station =

Railway Station in Rajasthan, India

Churu Junction
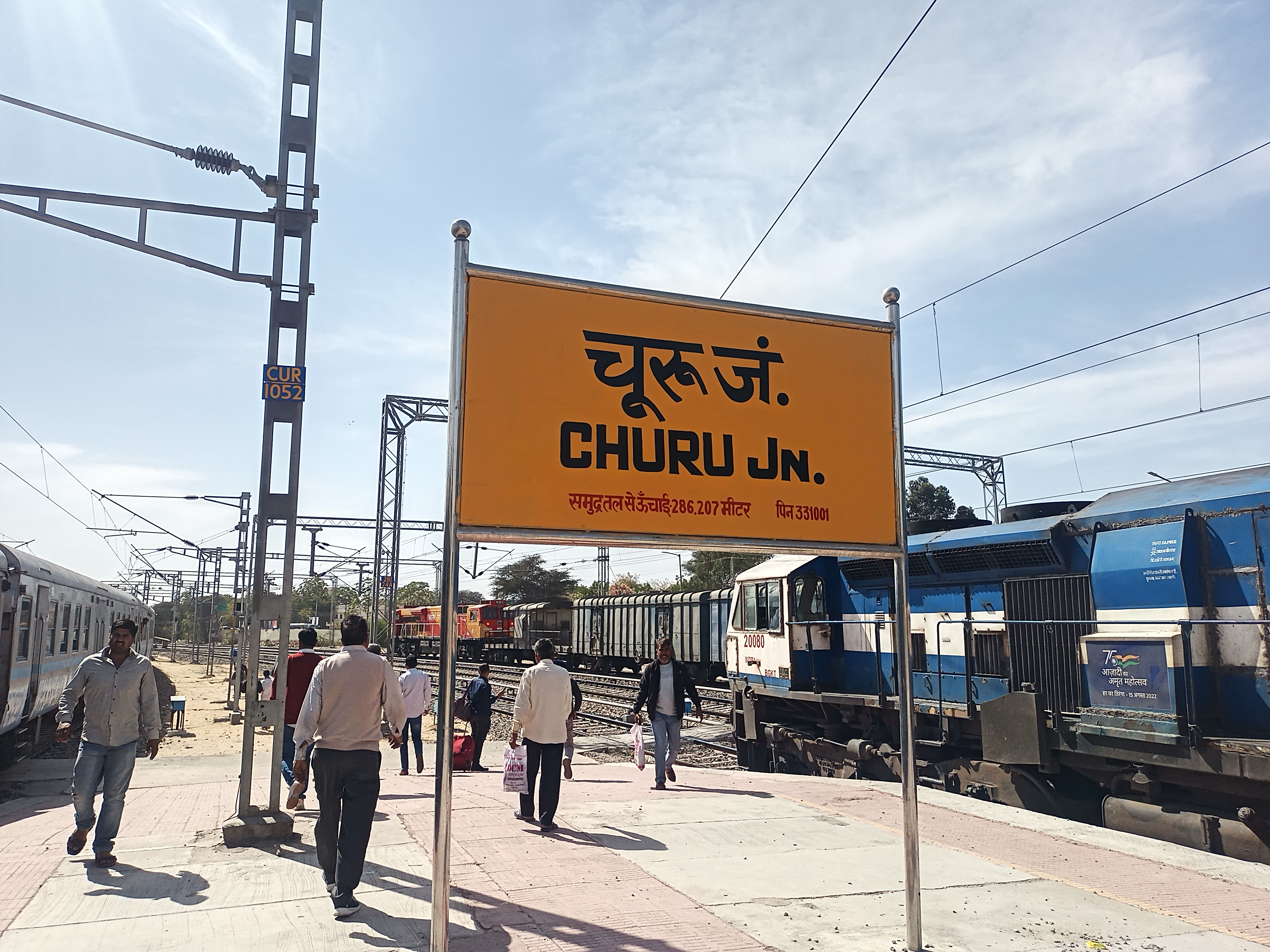
- Churu junction

General information
- Location: National Highway 52, Churu, Rajasthan; India
- Coordinates: 28.2887°N 74.9665°E
- Elevation: 108 metres (354 ft)
- Owner: Indian Railways
- Operator: Bikaner railway division
- Lines: Bikaner–Rewari line Jaipur–Churu line
- Platforms: 4
- Tracks: 5
- Connections: Auto stand

Construction
- Structure type: Standard (on-ground station)
- Parking: yes
- Cycle facilities: yes

Other information
- Status: Functioning
- Station code: CUR
- Fare zone: North Western Railway
Location

Churu Junction railway station is a major railway station in Churu district, Rajasthan. Its code is CUR. It serves Churu city.

== Infrastructure ==
The station consists of four platforms.

== Line ==
Churu lies on the Delhi–Rewari–Bikaner broad gauge railway line and is also connected to Jaipur via Sikar and Reengus. Electrification of the Rewari–Churu–Bikaner and Churu-Jaipur track is completed. Electrification of Ratangarh–Rewari and Sikar-Jaipur section of these route has been completed, simultaneously.
