= Jodhpur–Bathinda line =

Historic subway line in India

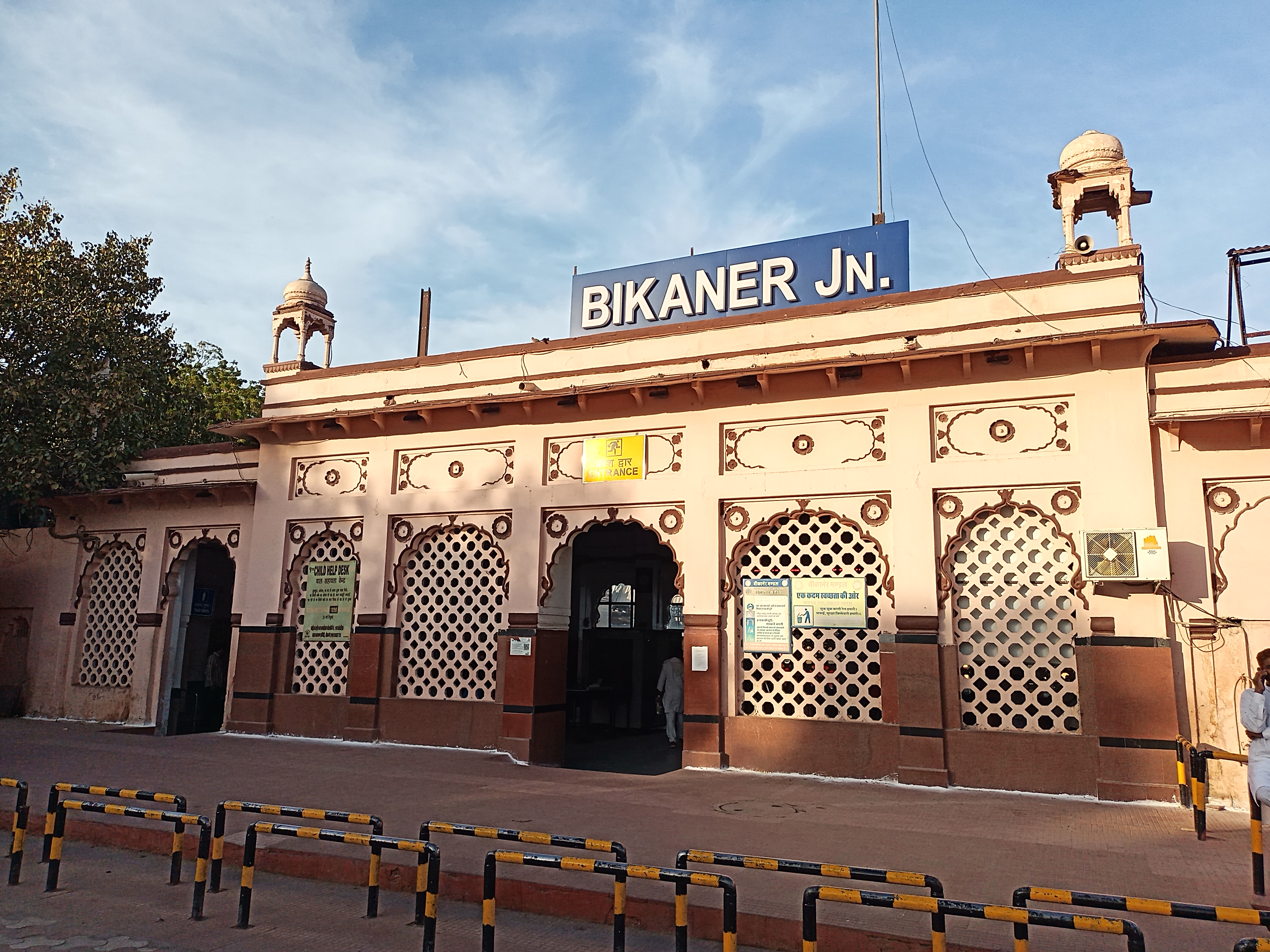
- Bikaner junction is an important railway station on Jodhpur–Bathinda line

Overview
- Status: Operational
- Owner: Indian Railways
- Locale: Fringe areas of Thar Desert, Rajasthan and small sections of Haryana and Punjab
- Termini: Jodhpur; Bathinda

Service
- Operator(s): North Western Railway

History
- Opened: 1901–02

Technical
- Track length: 600 km (373 mi)
- Track gauge: 1,676 mm (5 ft 6 in) broad gauge
- Electrification: Yes
- Operating speed: 110 km/h (68 mph)
- Highest elevation: Jodhpur 241 m (791 ft), Bathinda 208 m (682 ft)

The Jodhpur–Bathinda line connects Jodhpur, in the Indian state of Rajasthan to Bathinda in the Punjab, via Dabwali Railway in Haryana. During the British Raj, Bathinda was on the Delhi–Karachi line and after independence and partition of India in 1947, it is on the Delhi–Fazilka line. This line operates under the jurisdiction of North Western Railway.

== History ==
A 1,000 mm (3 ft 3 3/8 in)-wide metre-gauge line from Marwar Junction to Pali was built by the Rajputana Railway in 1882. It was extended to Luni in 1884 and Jodhpur in 1885. It formed the first Jodhpur Railway. It later became part of Jodhpur–Bikaner Railway.

In 1889, the Bikaner Princely State and Jodhpur Princely State started constructing the Jodhpur–Bikaner Railway within the Rajputana Agency. In 1891 the metre gauge Jodhpur – Merta Road sector was opened on 8 April, the Merta Road–Nagaur sector on 16 October, and the Nagaur–Bikaner sector on 9 December. In 1901–02, the metre-gauge line was extended to Bathinda. The Jodhpur–Bikaner line was extended to Bathinda in 1901–02 to connect it with the metre-gauge section of the Bombay, Baroda and Central India Railway and the metre gauge of North Western Railway Delhi–Fazilka line via Hanumangarh.

Sometime around or prior to 1991, the construction work for the conversion from meter gauge to 1,676 mm (5 ft 6 in)-wide 5 ft 6 in (1,676 mm) broad gauge of the Jodhpur–Bikaner line, along with the link to Phulera, were started, and it was already functioning as broad gauge Jodhpur–Merta City–Bikaner–Bathinda line by 2008.

== Passenger movement ==
Jodhpur is the only railway station on this line which is amongst the top hundred booking stations of Indian Railways.

== Workshops ==
The former metre-gauge workshop at Jodhpur now performs periodic overhauling of broad-gauge passenger coaches. The former metre-gauge workshop at Bikaner (Lalgarh) workshop carries out periodic overhauling of broad-gauge coaches and wagons.
