= Hazrat Nizamuddin–Pune Duronto Express =

Train in India

Hazrat Nizamuddin – Pune Junction AC Duronto Express
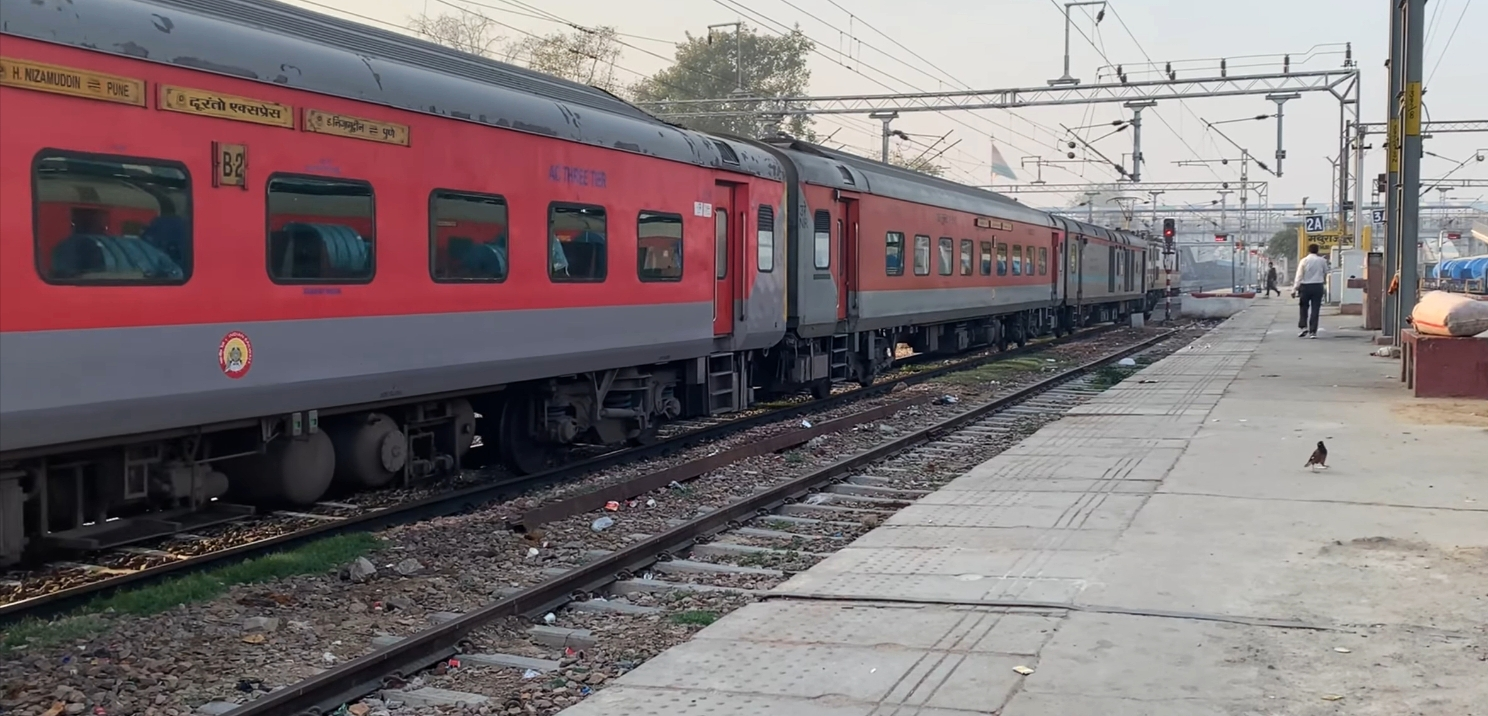
- Hazrat Nizamuddin – Pune Junction Duronto Express Arriving At Mathura Junction railway station

Overview
- Service type: Duronto Express
- First service: 28 September 2009; 17 years ago
- Current operator: Northern Railways

Route
- Termini: Hazrat Nizamuddin (NZM); Pune Junction (PUNE)
- Stops: 8
- Distance travelled: 1,515 km (941 mi)
- Average journey time: 19 hours 45 minutes
- Service frequency: Bi-weekly
- Train number: 12263 / 12264

On-board services
- Classes: 1 AC, 2 AC & 3 AC
- Seating arrangements: No
- Sleeping arrangements: Yes
- Catering facilities: Yes
- Observation facilities: Large windows
- Baggage facilities: Overhead racks

Technical
- Rolling stock: LHB coach
- Track gauge: 1,676 mm (5 ft 6 in)
- Operating speed: 75 km/h (47 mph) average including halts

The 12263 / 12264 Hazrat Nizamuddin–Pune Duronto Express is a Superfast Express train of Indian Railways Duronto Express type connecting Hazrat Nizamuddin (NZM) to Pune (PUNE). It is currently being operated with train numbers 12263 / 12264.

== Coach composition ==
The rake has 10 AC 3 tier coaches, 3 AC 2 tier coaches, 1 AC First Class, 1 Pantry car and 2 EOG cars making a total of 17 coaches. The train is similar to Pune–Ahmedabad Duronto. Earlier train was of 16 coaches with ICF Rajdani rakes. It had speed of 130 kmph.

== Background ==
This train had its inaugural run on 28 September 2009. It currently runs with new LHB Rajdhani rakes, which were allotted to it recently. It is one of 3 Duronto Express trains running out of Pune Junction, the other trains being the 12221/22 Pune–Howrah Duronto Express & 12297/98 Pune–Ahmedabad Duronto Express. It travels at a peak speed of 130 km/h with an average speed of 76 km/h as 12263 and 75 km/h as 12264.

== Service ==
It is the fastest train on the Delhi–Pune sector. It averages 76.96 km/h as 12263 Duronto Express covering 1520 km in 19 hrs 45 mins & in 20 hrs 45 mins averaging 73.25 km/h as 12264 Duronto Express.

Some of the other trains that cover the Delhi–Pune sectors are 12629/30 Karnataka Sampark Kranti Express, 11077/78 Jhelum Express, 12779/80 Goa Express, 12781/82 Swarna Jayanti Express.

== Route ==
The train halts at Kota Junction, Ratlam Junction, Vadodara Junction, Surat, Vasai Road in both directions.

== Traction ==
At its introduction, it was hauled by a WCAM-2/2P or WCAM-3 locomotives of the Kalyan Shed from Pune to Vadodara Junction after which a Tughlakabad or Vadodara-based WAP-7 or Ghaziabad-based WAP-5 used to haul the train for the remainder of its journey. This was due to DC traction on the Central Line in Mumbai region. Now it is hauled end to end by Vadodara or Tuglakabad WAP 7, as an offlink Ajni WAP 7 hauls it.

With a complete changeover from DC to AC in 2014, it is currently hauled end to end by a Tughlakabad-based WAP-7 locomotive.

== See also ==
- Goa Express
- Jhelum Express
