= Visakhapatnam–Secunderabad Duronto Express =

Train in India

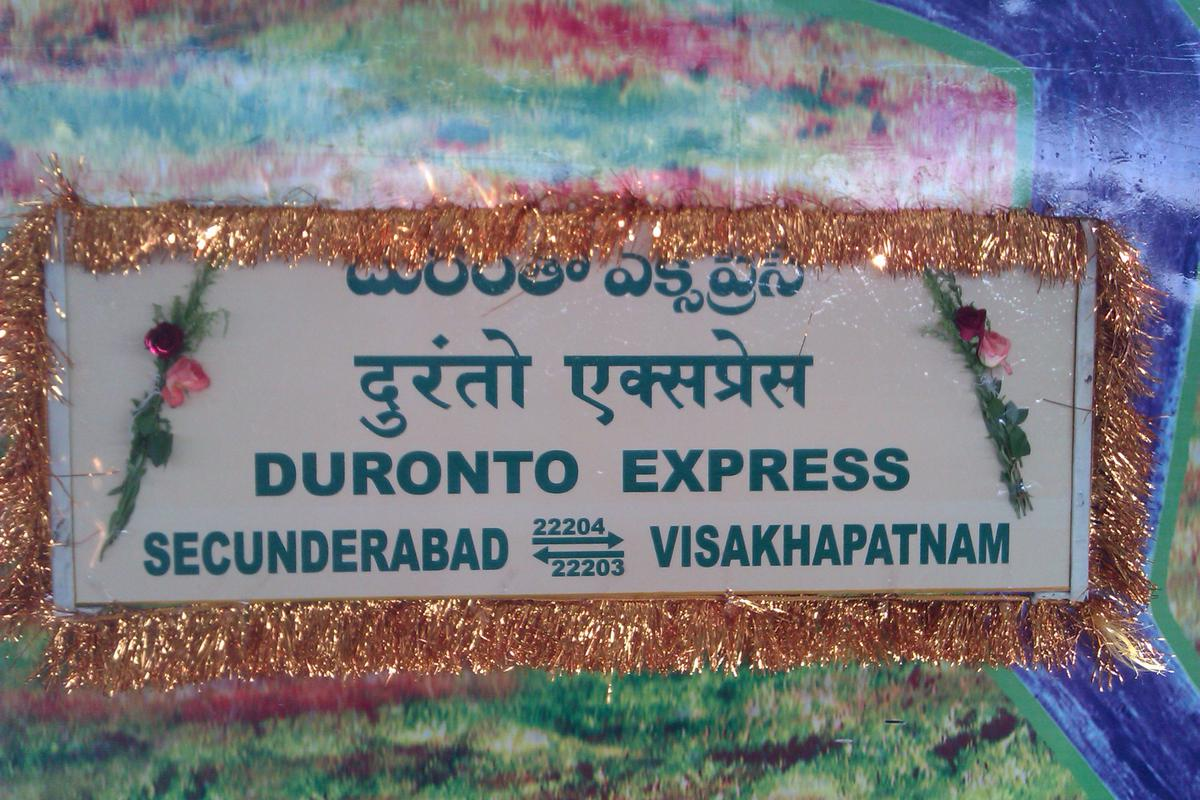

Overview
- Service type: Duronto Express
- Locale: Andhra Pradesh, Telangana
- First service: 12 July 2012
- Current operator: South Central Railway

Route
- Termini: Secunderabad Junction; Visakhapatnam Junction
- Stops: 2
- Distance travelled: 701 km (436 mi)
- Average journey time: 10 hours 30 minutes
- Service frequency: tri-weekly
- Train number: 22203/22204

On-board services
- Class: AC 1, 2, 3
- Seating arrangements: Yes
- Sleeping arrangements: Yes
- Catering facilities: No
- Observation facilities: Large windows
- Baggage facilities: Below the seats

Technical
- Rolling stock: LHB Rake
- Track gauge: Broad – 1,676 mm (5 ft 6 in)
- Operating speed: 73 km/h
Route map
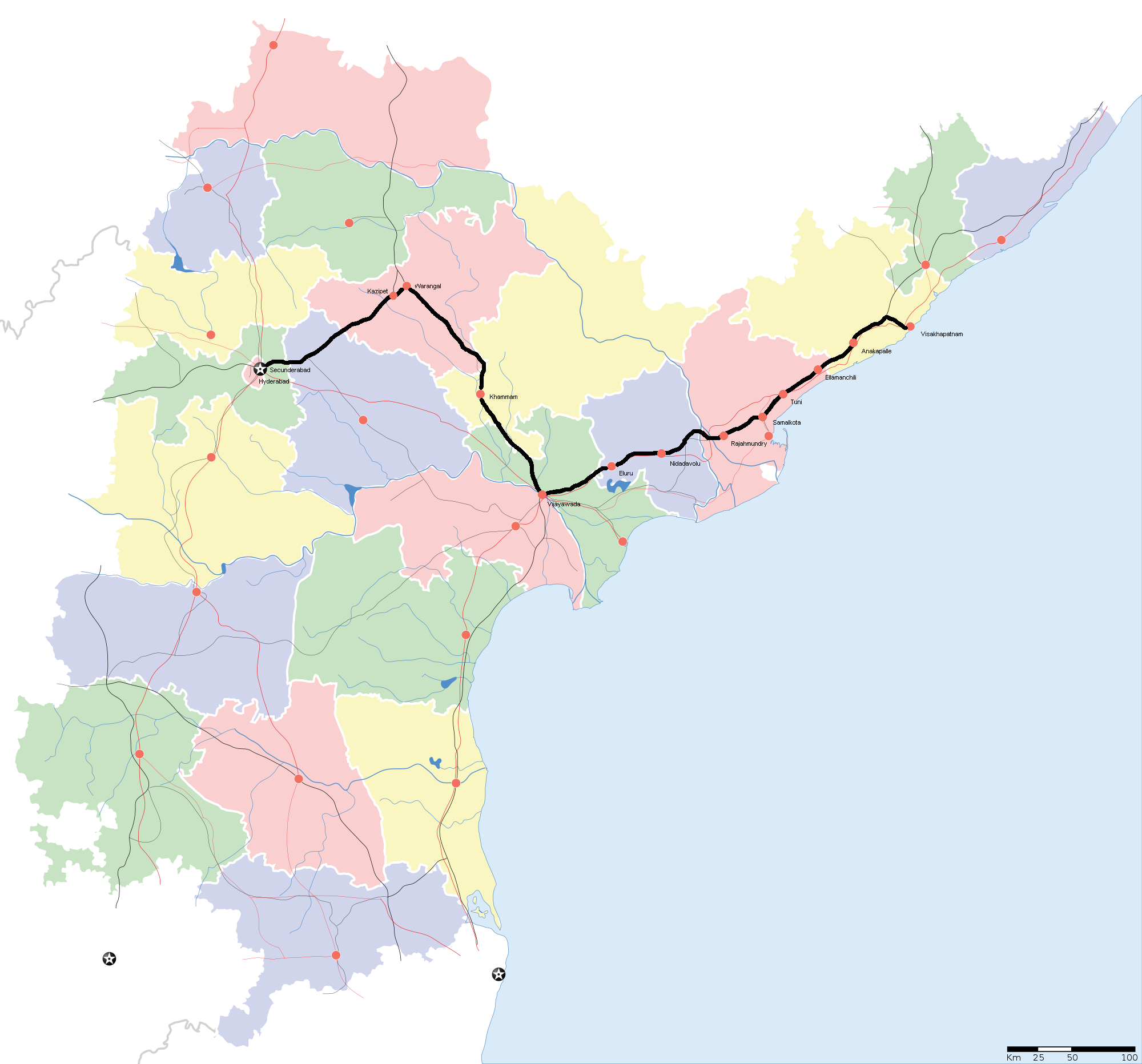

The Visakhapatnam–Secunderabad Duronto Express is a superfast AC express train of the Indian Railways, announced in 2011-12 Railway Budget by Mamata Banerjee, the then Minister of Indian Railways, connecting Secunderabad (SC) to Visakhapatnam (VSKP). It is the fastest way between the two cities and will consist of 18 coaches. On 30 June 2012, the Indian Railways announced that the train will be flagged of on 6 July. It was however flagged off from Visakhapatnam on 12 July 2012.

== Overview ==
The Visakhapatnam–Secunderabad Duronto Express has Two stops between the two cities to cover the distance of 701 km (436 mi) in 10 hours, 15 minutes. It is the 2nd fastest train between the two cities. The train has a commercial stops at Vijayawada Junction and Guntur Junction. From Oct 1st 2021 it is diverted via Guntur Junction to increase the connectivity between Guntur and Vishakapatnam.

== Time Table ==
VISAKHAPATNAM–SECUNDERABAD DURONTO EXPRESS
22204		Stations	22203	
Arrival	Departure	Stations	Arrival	Departure
----	20:15	Secunderabad Junction	06:05	----
23:53	23:55	Guntur Junction	01:25	01:27
01:00	01:10	Vijayawada Junction	00:30	00:40
06:25	----	Visakhapatnam Junction	----	19:50

== Coach and Rake ==
CC;- 1AC—1, 2AC—3, 3AC—11, EOG—2 total 18 LHB Coaches. This train is Pulled by Lallaguda WAP-7 This train has No RSA. Single Dedicated Rake. PM @ SC/SCR

== See also ==
- Duronto Express
- Hyderabad–Visakhapatnam Godavari Express
- Secunderabad Vishakhapatnam Garib Rath Express
- Visakha Express
- Secunderabad Mumbai Duronto Express
- Secunderabad New Delhi Duronto Express
- Secunderabad Railway Station
