= Lokmanya Tilak Terminus–Secunderabad AC Duronto Express =

Secunderabad - Lokmanya Tilak Terminus AC Duronto Express
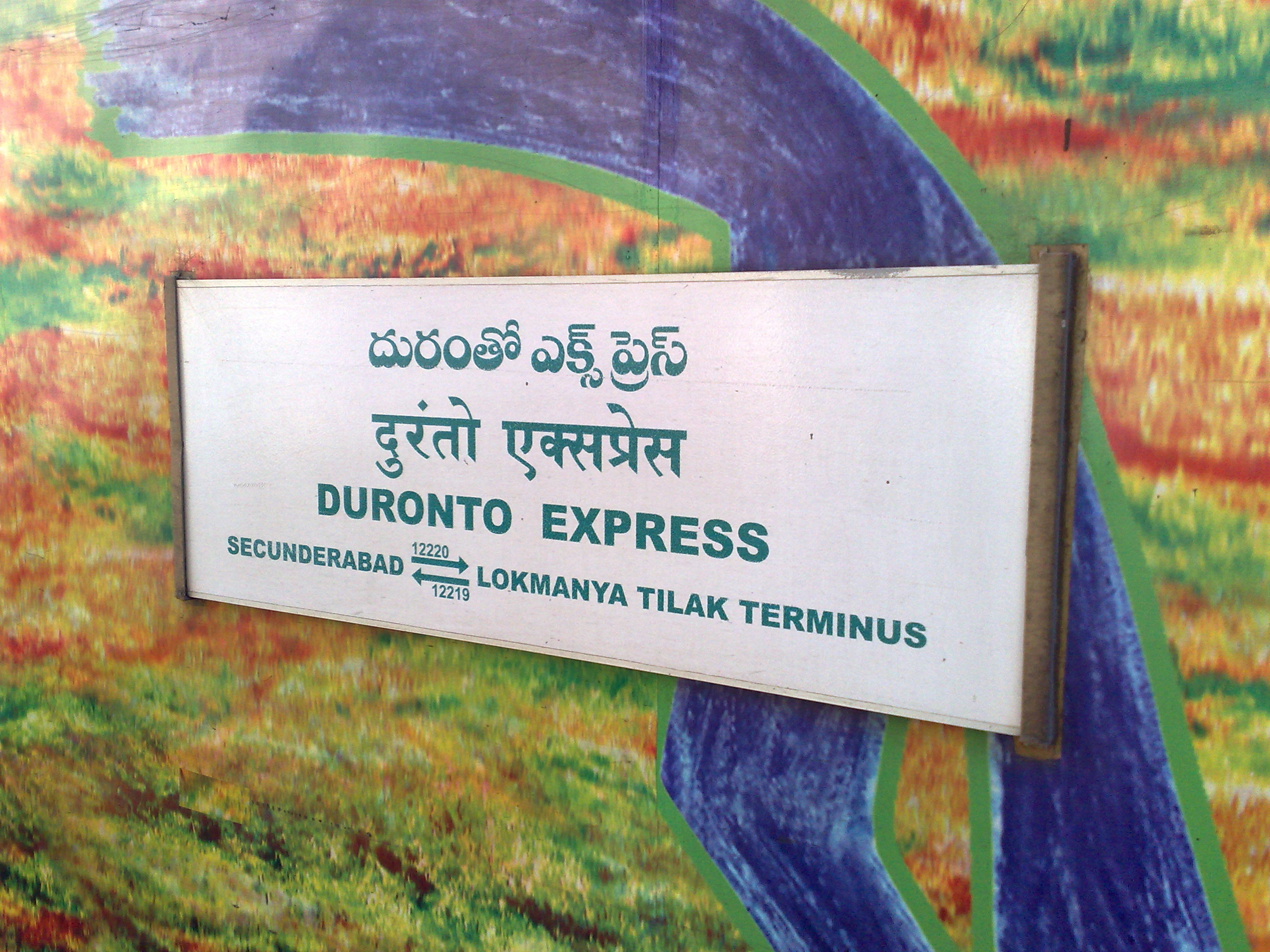

Overview
- Service type: Superfast Express, Duronto Express
- First service: 23 February 2011
- Current operator: South Central Railways

Route
- Termini: Secunderabad Junction; Lokmanya Tilak Terminus
- Stops: 7 (2 passenger stops, 5 technical stops)
- Distance travelled: 772 km (480 mi)
- Average journey time: 12 hours
- Service frequency: 2 days a week. 12220 Secunderabad–Lokmanya Tilak Terminus Duronto Express – Tuesday & Friday. 12219 Lokmanya Tilak Terminus–Secunderabad Duronto Express – Wednesday & Saturday.
- Train numbers: 12220 Up, 12219 Down

On-board services
- Classes: AC 1st Class, AC 2 tier, AC 3 tier
- Seating arrangements: No
- Sleeping arrangements: Yes
- Catering facilities: Pantry car attached
- Observation facilities: LHB coach

Technical
- Rolling stock: Standard Indian Railways Duronto coaches
- Track gauge: 1,676 mm (5 ft 6 in)
- Operating speed: 110 km/h (68 mph) (Maximum Speed), 64.37376 km/h (40 mph) (Average speed), including halts

The Secunderabad–Lokmanya Tilak Terminus Duronto Express is a Superfast Express train under Duronto category that operates between Secunderabad Junction and Lokmanya Tilak Terminus.

The service is operated by South Central Railway zone of Indian Railways and connects the Indian states of Telangana and Maharashtra using train numbers 12220 (Secunderabad–Mumbai (LTT)) and 12219 (Mumbai (LTT)–Secunderabad) respectively

== Service ==
The 12220 / 19 Secunderabad–Mumbai (LTT) Duronto Express covers the distance of 773 kilometres in 12 hours (64.42 km/h) in both directions and its fare thus includes an additional Superfast surcharge for the service as it is quite above the average speed of an express train which is 55 km/h (34 mph) as per Indian Railways rules.

The train offers only air-conditioned coaches. Its length generally comprises 1 AC 1st-class coach, 3 AC 2-tier coaches and 9 AC 3-tier coaches for passengers, generator coaches on either ends for powering the AC and a pantry car for catering services

As is customary with most train services in India, coach composition may be amended at the discretion of Indian Railways depending on demand.

== Operation ==
- The 12220 Secunderabad–Mumbai (LTT) Duronto Express starts from Secunderabad Junction every Tuesday and Friday night reaching Lokmanya Tilak Terminus the next day.
- The 12219 Lokmanya Tilak Terminus–Secunderabad Duronto starts from Lokmanya Tilak Terminus every Wednesday and Saturday night reaching Secunderabad Junction the next day.

== Routing and halts ==
Being a Duronto Express train, it has commercial halts at Pune Junction and Solapur between its terminal stops.

However the 12220/12219 Lokmanya Tilak Terminus-Secunderabad AC Duronto Express runs from Secunderabad Junction to Lokmanya Tilak Terminus with technical halts at Wadi Junction,Lonavala,Karjat and Khandala.

Mumbai LTT - Secunderabad AC Duronto Express
12220		Stations	12219	
Arrival	Departure	Stations	Arrival	Departure
----	23:05	Secunderabad Junction	11:05	----
01:42	01:42	Wadi Junction (Technical Halt)	08:05	08:10
03:50	03:55	Solapur	05:57	06:00
07:50	07:55	Pune Junction	02:00	02:05
08:57	08:57	Lonavala (Technical Halt For Bankers)	00:56	00:58
----	----	Karjat Junction (Technical Halt for Bankers)	00:17	00:20
11:00	----	Lokmanya Tilak Terminus	----	23:05

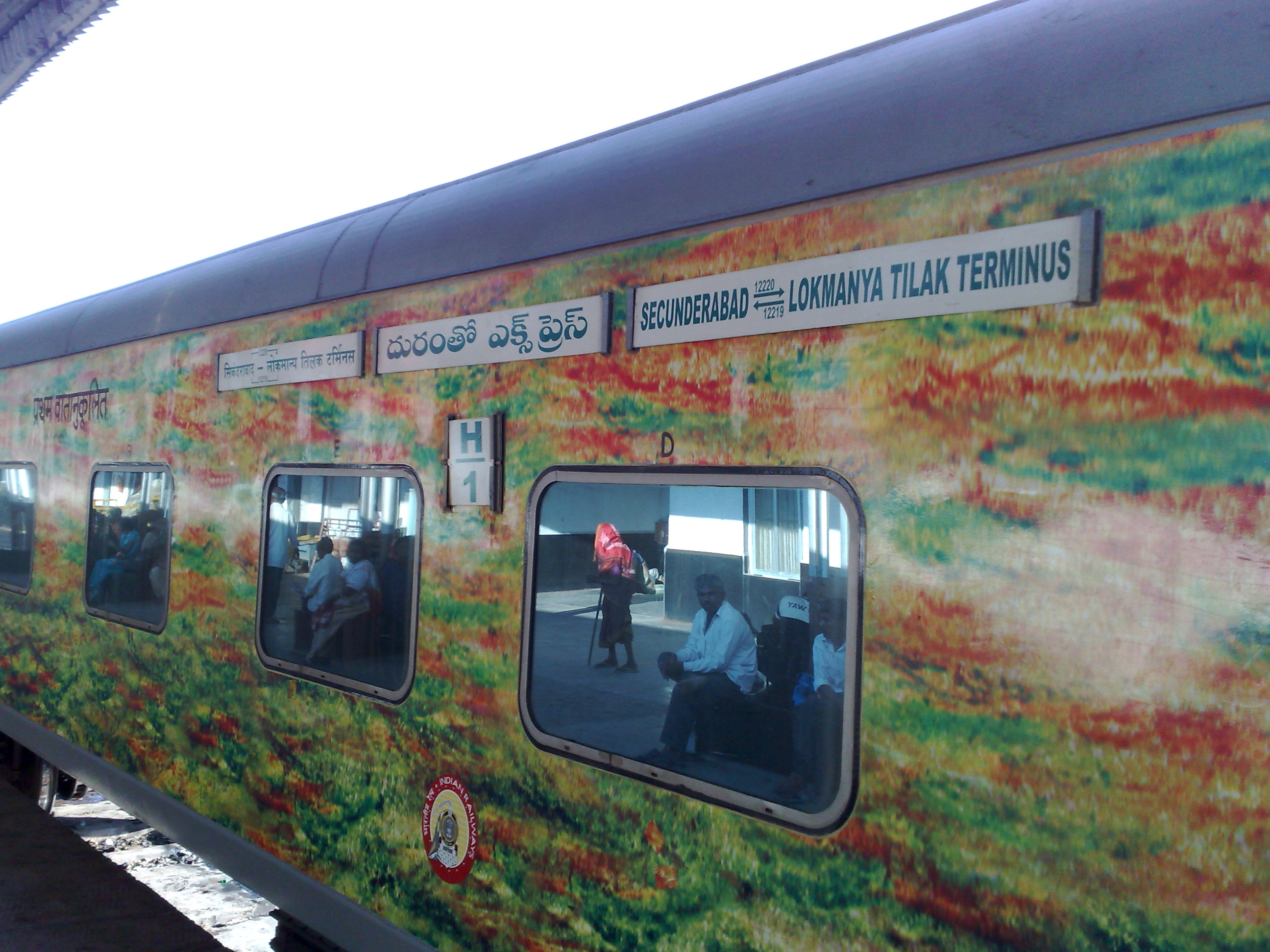
12219 Secundrabad Duronto Express

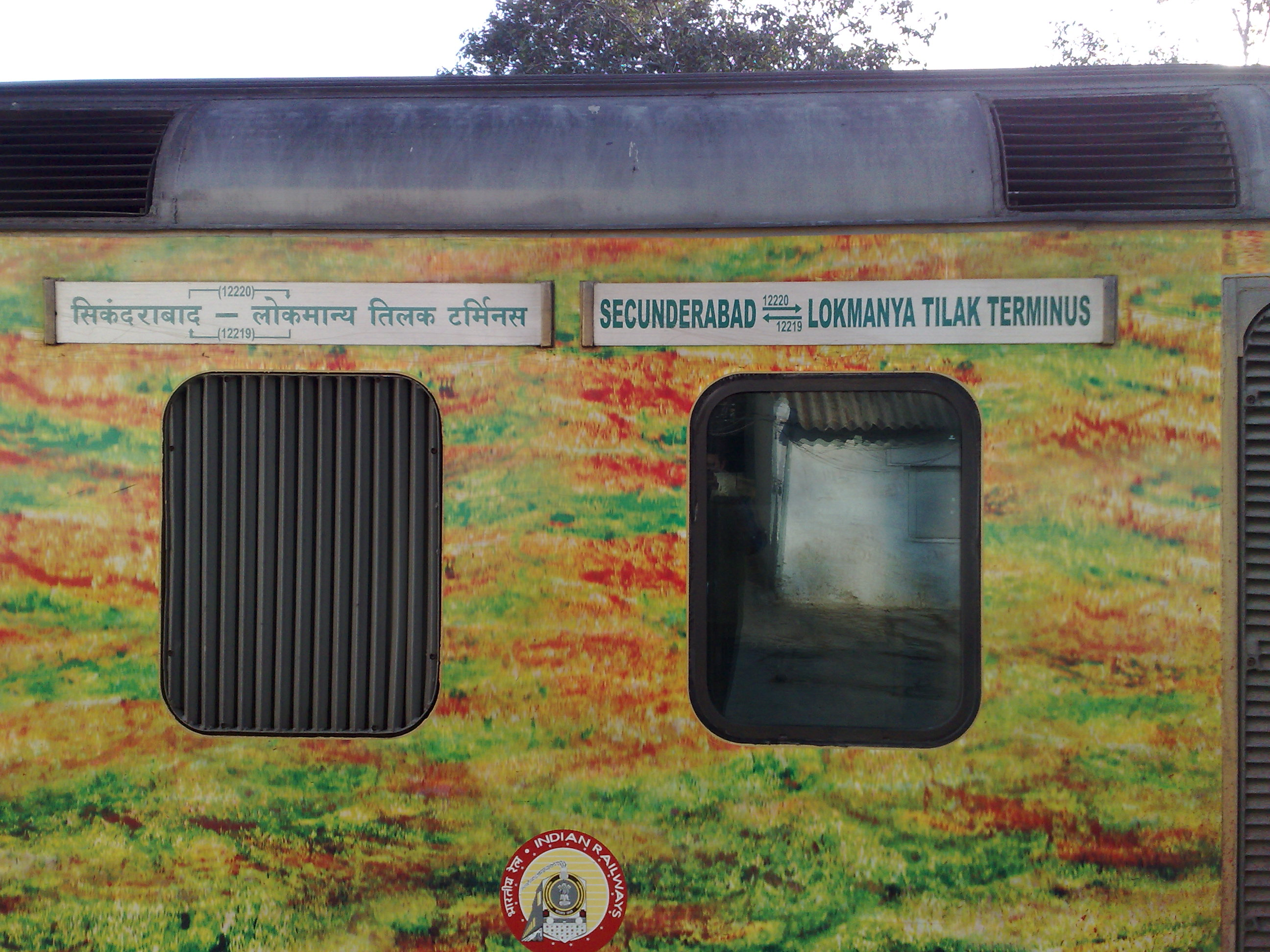
12219 Secundrabad Duronto Express – EOG car

== Traction ==
As the total route is electrified it will be hauled end-to-end by a Lallaguda-based WAP-7 for its entire journey.

The 12219 Lokmanya Tilak Terminus–Secunderabad Duronto Express gets 2 bankers which are attached to the train at Karjat in order to haul the train up to Lonavala (normally WAG-5 or WAG-7).

== Speed ==
The maximum permissible speed of the train is up to 110 km/h except some parts. Its all coaches are of air conditioned LHB coach type which is capable of reaching 160 kmph but it does not touch. Sometimes people become confused because according to Indian Railways Permanent Way Manual (IRPWM) on Indian Railways website or Indian Railway Institute of Civil Engineering website, the BG (Broad Gauge) lines have been classified into six groups ‘A’ to ‘E’ on the basis of the future maximum permissible speeds but it may not be same as present speed.

105 kmph between Lokmanya Tilak T and Karjat as it is about whole part of Mumbai Karjat route having speed of 105 km/h, 80 km/h in Karjat Palasdari only 3 km-long route, 60 km/h in Palasdari Lonavala 25 km-long ghat (hill) route, 110 km/h in Lonavala Wadi route, Wadi Vikarabad Secunderabad is unknown.

== Accidents ==
- On 4 May 2014, the 12220 Secunderabad–Lokmanya Tilak Terminus Duronto Express collided with a tractor trailer near Pune Junction killing 3 persons and seriously wounding 8.
- On 12 September 2015, 12220 Secunderabad–Mumbai Duronto Express Express derailed at Martur station between Shahbad and Gulbarga on Solapur Division in Karnataka at around 2:15 am. Two passengers were killed and more than 30 injured when eight of its coaches were derailed.

== See also ==
- Lokmanya Tilak Terminus
- Visakhapatnam–Secunderabad Duronto Express
- Secunderabad–Hazrat Nizamuddin Duronto Express
- Secunderabad railway station
