= Duronto Express =

Series of Express train in India

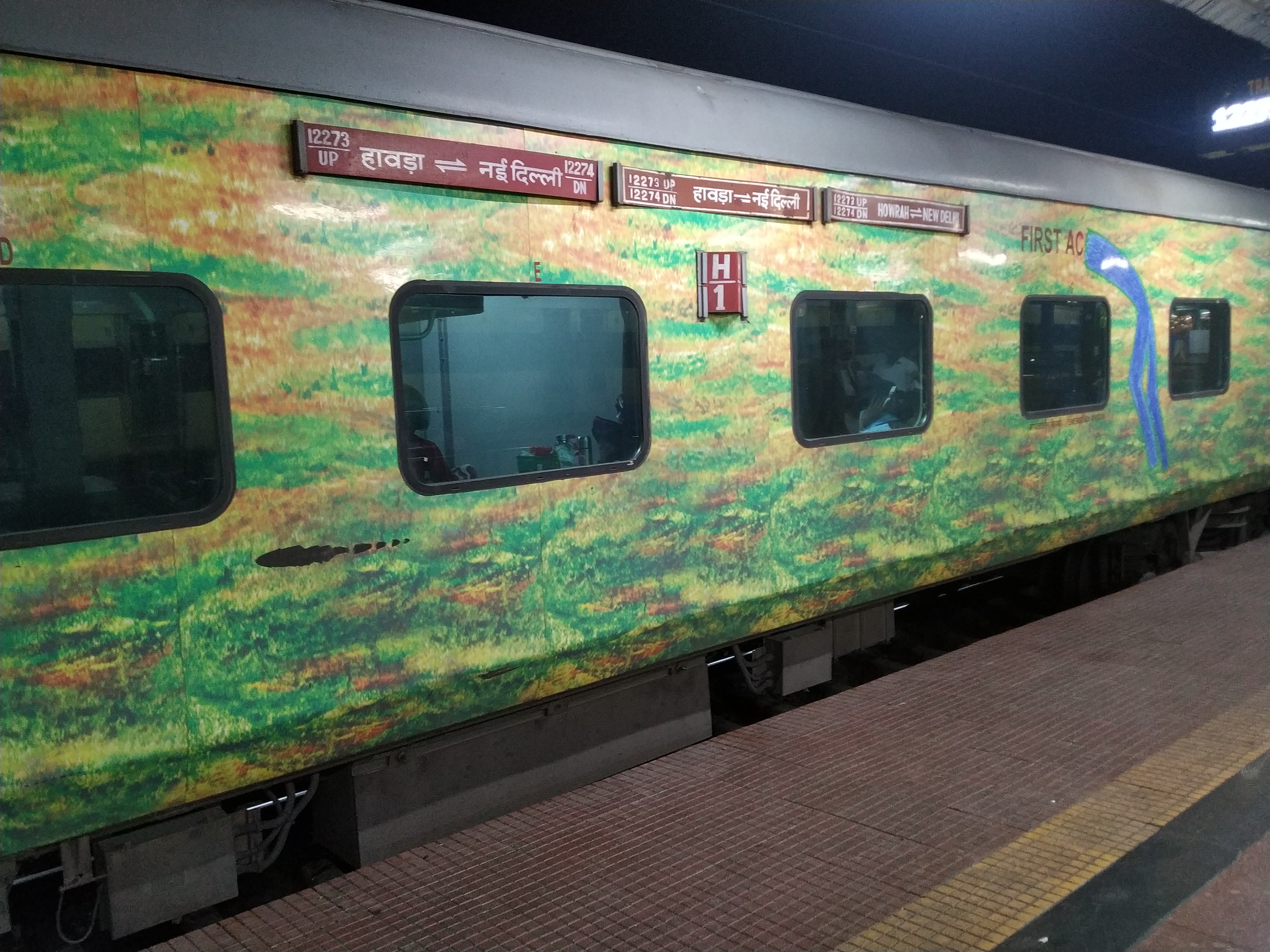
- Howrah-New Delhi Duronto Express at the Prayagraj Junction

Overview
- Status: Active
- First service: 18 September 2009; 17 years ago
- Successor: Vande Bharat (sleeper trainset)
- Current operator: Indian Railways

Route
- Line used: 24

On-board services
- Classes: AC First Class, AC Two Tier, AC Three Tier, AC Three Tier Economy, Sleeper Class, 2nd Class Sitting
- Seating arrangements: Yes
- Sleeping arrangements: Yes
- Catering facilities: On-board catering
- Observation facilities: Large windows, reading lights, announcement speakers in all classes
- Baggage facilities: Underseat

Technical
- Rolling stock: LHB coach
- Track gauge: 5 ft 6 in (1,676 mm) broad gauge
- Electrification: In 20 trains
- Operating speed: Avg: 60 – 83 km/h (37 – 51 mph); Max: 140 km/h (87 mph)
- Track owner: Indian Railways

Duronto Express, translating to "restless" in Bengali, is a class of long-distance rapid trains operated by Indian Railways. Initially conceived to operate non-stop between origin and destination stations, since January 2016, these trains have been permitted to make additional commercial stops and accept ticket bookings from technical halts. Before the introduction of trains like the Gatimaan Express and Vande Bharat Express, Duronto trains held the distinction of being the fastest trains in India. Unlike its counterpart, the Rajdhani Express, which links India's capital, Delhi, to state capitals, the Duronto Express connects major metropolitan areas, state capitals, and the national capital, just like Shatabdi Trains.

== History ==
The Government of India's Ministry of Railways has pursued the introduction of high-speed rail services in India. In 2007, the ministry initiated a pre-feasibility study for a 500-kilometre corridor between Delhi and Amritsar. Railway Minister Mamata Banerjee announced plans in January 2009 to engage global consultants for the implementation of high-speed trains on select routes. The Indian Railway Budget for the fiscal year 2010 saw the establishment of the National High Speed Rail Authority (NHSRA) under Banerjee's leadership, aimed at developing high-speed rail corridors across the country. The Duronto Express project was part of the government's initiatives to introduce semi-high speed rail travel ahead of the full implementation of high-speed railways.

In line with these efforts, Mamata Banerjee flagged off the inaugural Duronto Express service from Sealdah Railway Station to New Delhi on 18 September 2009. The objective of this train service was to provide high-speed rail connectivity comparable to the Rajdhani Express between various metropolitan and non-metropolitan cities, catering to diverse segments of the population. Unlike the Rajdhani Express, which primarily offered air-conditioned coaches, the Duronto Express was designed to accommodate a range of reserved coaches, LHB coach earlier was ICF coach including AC First Class, AC Two Tier, AC Three Tier, AC Three Tier Economy, and Sleeper Class. Notably, the initial journey of the Duronto Express from Sealdah to New Delhi featured AC First Class, AC Two Tier, AC Three Tier, and AC Three Tier Economy coaches.

== About ==
The Duronto Express holds the second highest priority among trains on the Indian railway network. Passengers aboard this service are provided with optional meals, with the cost of food included in the train fare. Depending on the duration and timing of the journey, passengers can expect to be served morning tea, breakfast, lunch, high tea, and dinner.

Duronto Express trains offer three classes of accommodation:

- AC First Class (1A): Featuring two-berth and four-berth coupes with locking facilities for privacy.
- AC 2-tier (2A): Providing open bays with four berths per bay, along with curtains for privacy.
- AC 3-tier (3A): Similar to AC two-tier but with six berths per bay.
- AC 3 Tier Economy (3E): Also similar to AC three-tier but with more seats and smaller berths.
- Sleeper Class (SL): Featuring open bays with six berths per bay.

Currently, the Indian Railways operates a total of 24 Duronto Express trains across various routes in the country.

== Traction ==
Some Duronto Express trains run with both diesel and electric locomotives, diesels like WDP-4, WDP-4D, WDM-3A and WDM-3D. Electric locomotives like WAP-4, WAP-5 and popular of all WAP-7

== List of Duronto Express trains ==
#	Train no.	Origin station	Terminal station	Zone	Frequency	Distance	Travel time	Avg speed	Halts	Inauguration
1	12213/12214	Yesvantpur Jn	Delhi Sarai Rohilla	SWR	Weekly	2,362 km (1,468 mi)	31h 55m	69 km/h (43 mph)	6	19 February 2011
2	12219/12220	Mumbai LTT	Secunderabad Jn	SCR	Bi-weekly	770 km (478 mi)	12h 05m	62 km/h (39 mph)	3	23 February 2011
3	12221/12222	Pune Jn	Howrah	SER	Bi-weekly	2,015 km (1,252 mi)	29h 00m	69 km/h (43 mph)	7	11 October 2010
4	12223/12224	Mumbai LTT	Ernakulam Jn	CR	Bi-weekly	1,599 km (994 mi)	22h 00m	59 km/h (37 mph)	5	18 January 2011
5	12227/12228	Mumbai Central	Indore Jn	WR	Bi-weekly	829 km (515 mi)	11h 10m	75 km/h (47 mph)	3	26 January 2011
6	12239/12240	Mumbai Central	Hisar Jn	WR	Bi-weekly	1,511 km (939 mi)	21h 25m	68 km/h (42 mph)	10	3 April 2011
7	12245/12246	Howrah	SMVT Bengaluru	SER	5 days/wk	1,937 km (1,204 mi)	29h 00m	65 km/h (40 mph)	4	30 December 2009
8	12259/12260	Sealdah	Bikaner Jn	ER	4 days/wk	1,920 km (1,193 mi)	25h 00m	75 km/h (47 mph)	10	18 September 2009
9	12261/12262	CSMT Mumbai	Howrah	SER	4 days/wk	1,965 km (1,221 mi)	27h 00m	72 km/h (45 mph)	6	29 September 2009
10	12263/12264	Pune Jn	Hazrat Nizamuddin	NR	Bi-weekly	1,511 km (939 mi)	19h 54m	75 km/h (47 mph)	5	29 September 2009
11	12265/12266	Delhi Sarai Rohilla	Jammu Tawi	NR	Tri-weekly	576 km (358 mi)	08h 40m	65 km/h (40 mph)	1	1 April 2010
12	12267/12268	Mumbai Central	Hapa	WR	Daily	815 km (506 mi)	11h 40m	68 km/h (42 mph)	3	22 December 2009
13	12269/12270	MGR Chennai Central	Hazrat Nizamuddin	SR	Bi-weekly	2,175 km (1,351 mi)	28h 05m	75 km/h (47 mph)	6	21 September 2009
14	12273/12274	Howrah	New Delhi	ER	Bi-weekly	1,531 km (951 mi)	22h 05m	69 km/h (43 mph)	5	2 April 2010
15	12281/12282	Bhubaneswar	New Delhi	ECoR	Weekly	1,730 km (1,075 mi)	23h 05m	76 km/h (47 mph)	5	4 April 2010
16	12283/12284	Ernakulam Jn	Hazrat Nizamuddin	NR	Weekly	2,638 km (1,639 mi)	41h 55m	63 km/h (39 mph)	10	7 March 2010
17	12285/12286	Secunderabad Jn	Hazrat Nizamuddin	SCR	Bi-weekly	1,661 km (1,032 mi)	21h 50m	73 km/h (45 mph)	4	14 March 2010
18	12289/12290	CSMT Mumbai	Nagpur Jn	CR	Daily	835 km (519 mi)	11h 05m	70 km/h (43 mph)	2	21 November 2009
19	12293/12294	Mumbai LTT	Prayagraj Jn	CR	Bi-weekly	1,342 km (834 mi)	19h 20m	65 km/h (40 mph)	4	16 March 2012
20	12297/12298	Ahmedabad Jn	Pune Jn	CR	Tri-weekly	625 km (388 mi)	08h 45m	65 km/h (40 mph)	3	11 March 2012
21	22201/22202	Sealdah	Puri	ER	Tri-weekly	518 km (322 mi)	07h 55m	62 km/h (39 mph)	2	12 February 2012
22	22203/22204	Visakhapatnam Jn	Secunderabad Jn	SCR	Tri-weekly	663 km (412 mi)	10h 35m	60 km/h (37 mph)	2	8 July 2012
23	22209/22210	Mumbai Central	New Delhi	WR	Bi-weekly	1,386 km (861 mi)	16h 45m	78 km/h (48 mph)	3	23 March 2012
24	22213/22214	Kolkata - Shalimar	Patna Jn	SER	Tri-weekly	537 km (334 mi)	08h 20m	60 km/h (37 mph)	2	19 February 2012

== List of defunct Duronto Express trains ==
#	Previous service	Now running as
1	Ajmer–Hazrat Nizamuddin Duronto Express	Ajmer–Delhi Sarai Rohilla Jan Shatabdi Express
2	Howrah–Puri Duronto Express	Howrah–Puri Shatabdi Express
3	Chennai–Coimbatore AC Duronto Express	Chennai Central–Coimbatore Shatabdi Express
4	Chennai–Thiruvananthapuram AC Duronto Express	Chennai–Thiruvananthapuram Super AC Express
5	Amritsar–Chandigarh Duronto Express	Amritsar–Chandigarh Superfast Express
6	Lucknow–New Delhi AC Duronto Express	Lucknow–New Delhi AC Superfast Express
7	Howrah–Digha Duronto Express	Howrah–Digha Super AC Superfast Express
8	Prayagraj–New Delhi Duronto Express	Prayagraj–New Delhi Humsafar Express
9	Chennai–Madurai AC Duronto Express	Chennai – Bodinayakanur AC Superfast Express

== Gallery ==
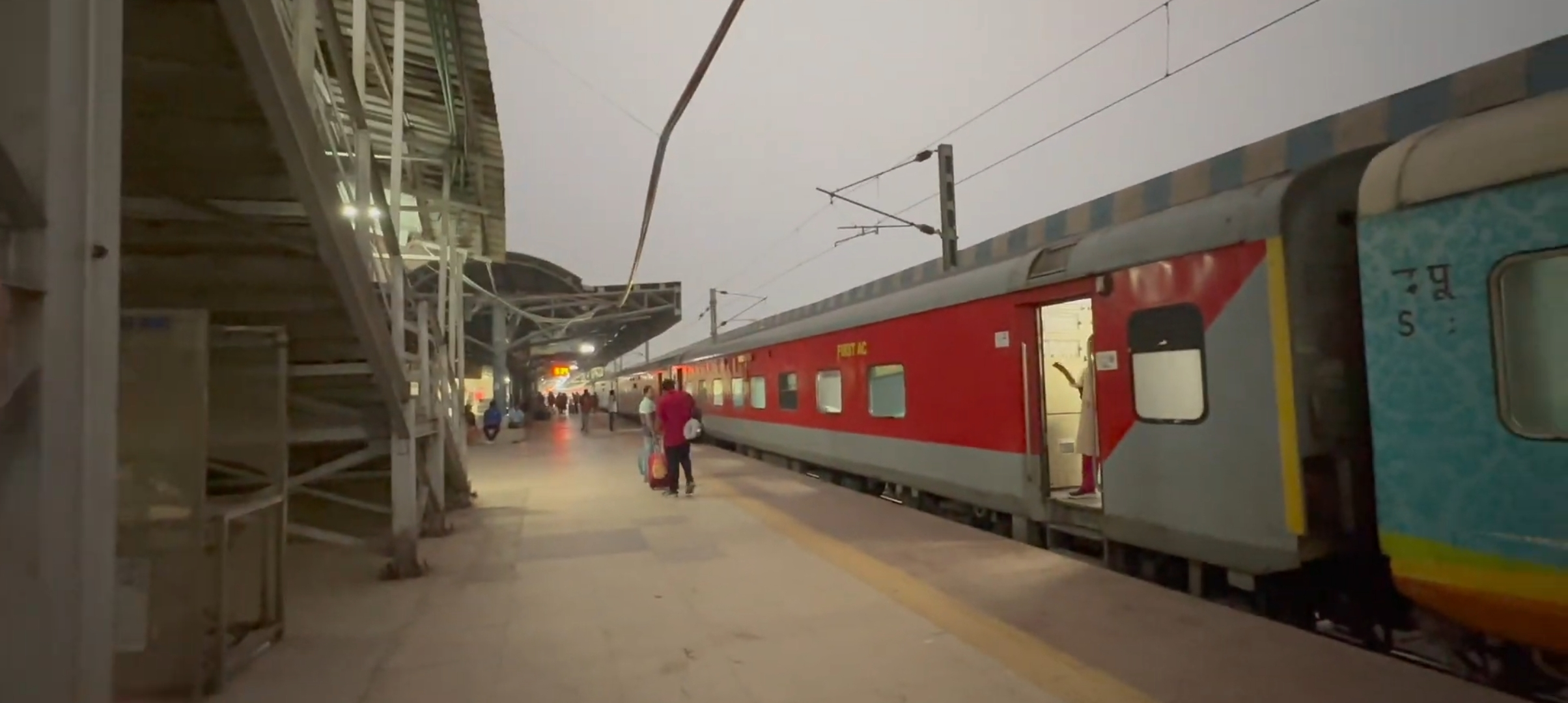
22214 Patna-Kolkata Shalimar AC Duronto Express on Platform 1 of Shalimar Railway Station

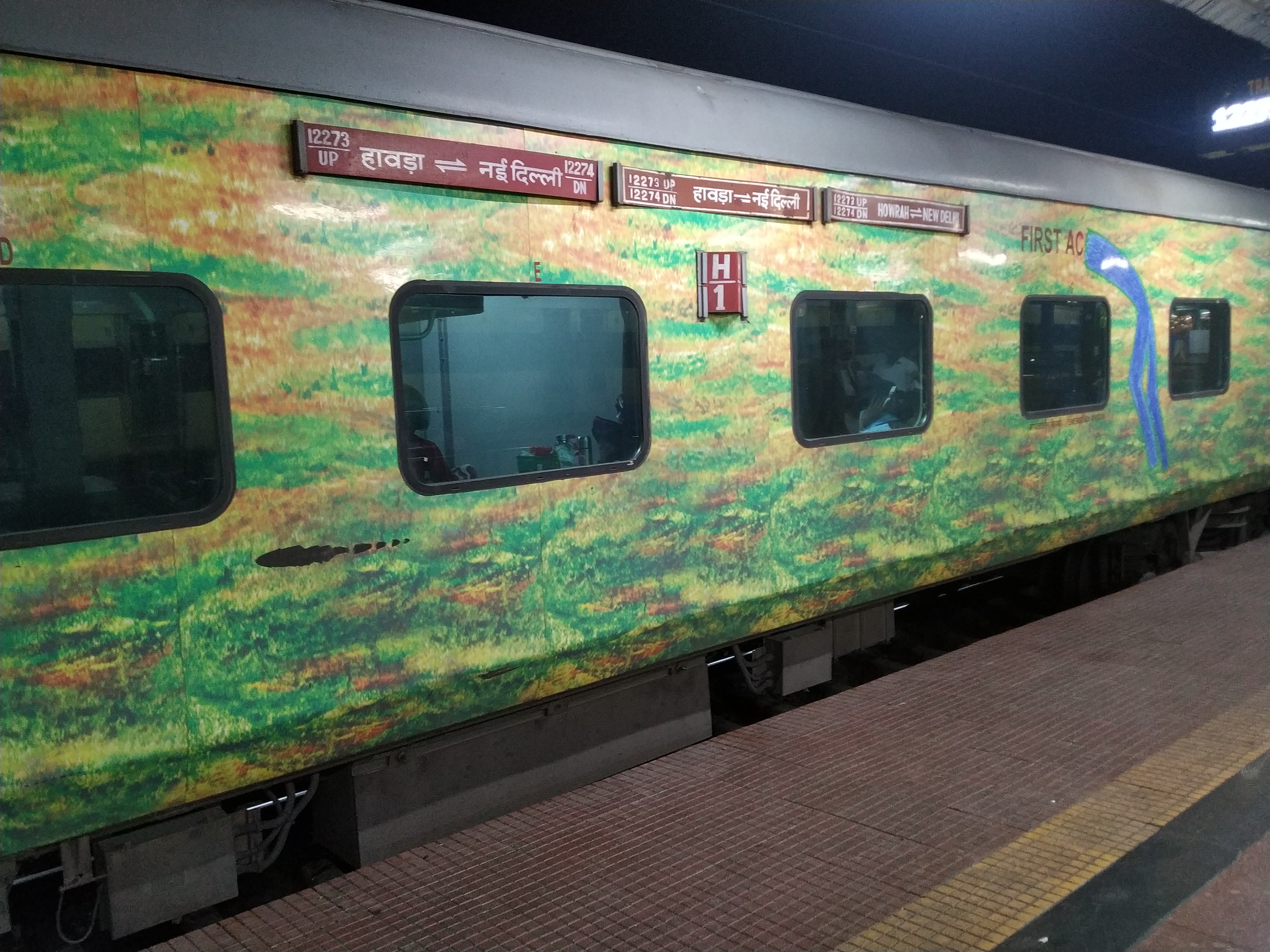
12273 Howrah-New Delhi Duronto Express on Platform 6 of Pandit Deen Dayal Upadhyaya Junction

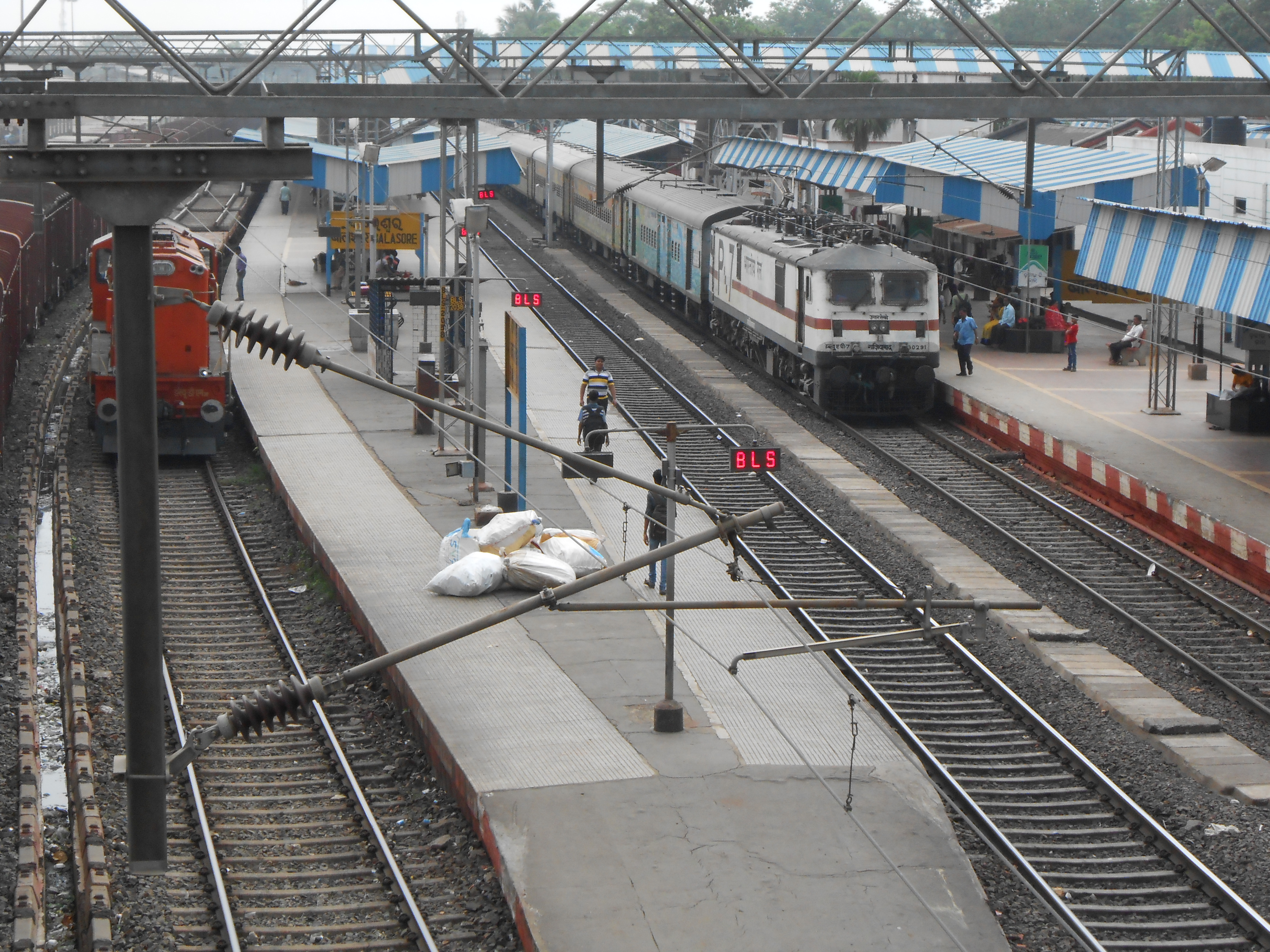
New Delhi–Bhubaneswar Duronto Express

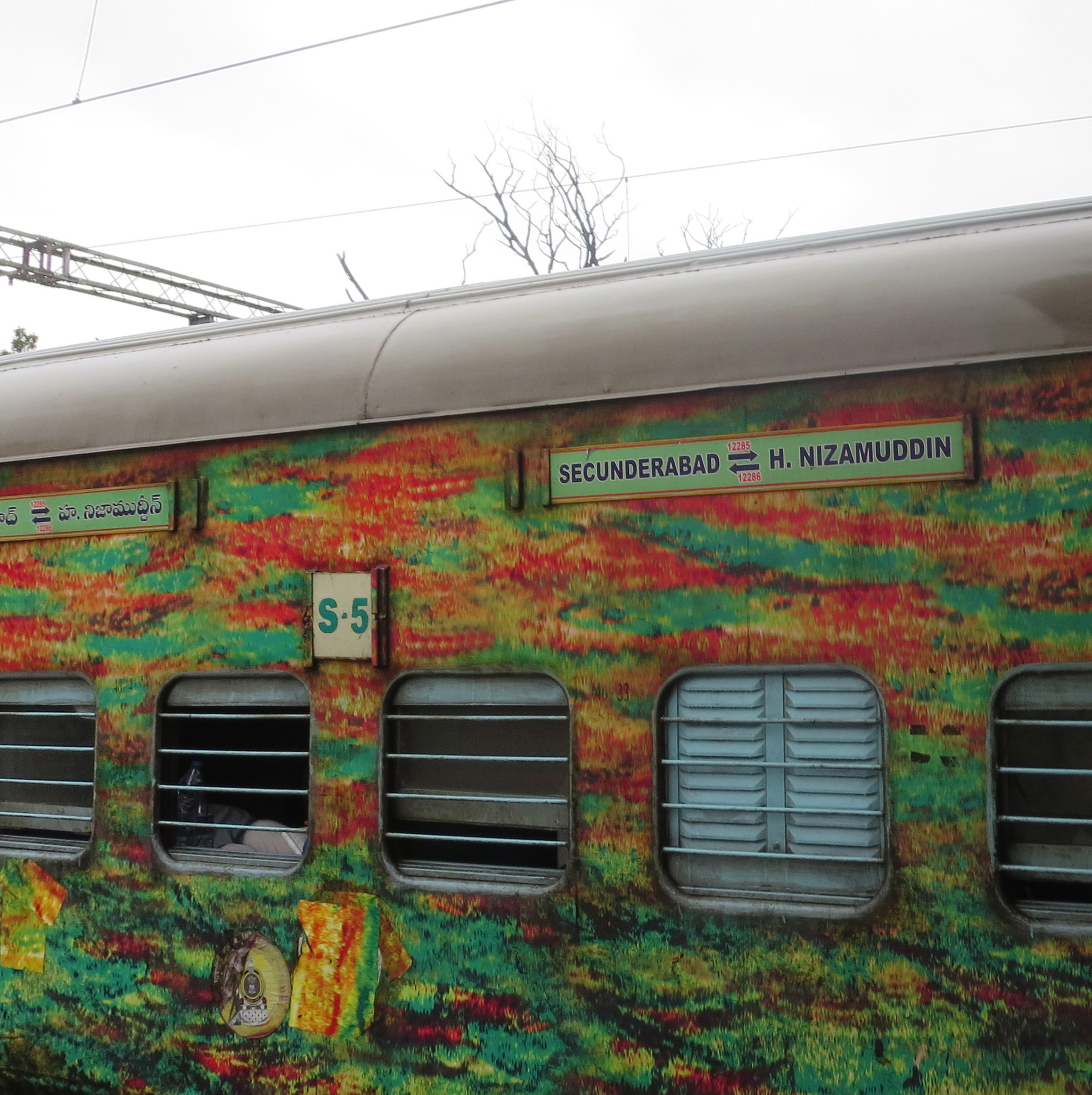
Secunderabad to Hazrat Nizamuddin Duronto Express

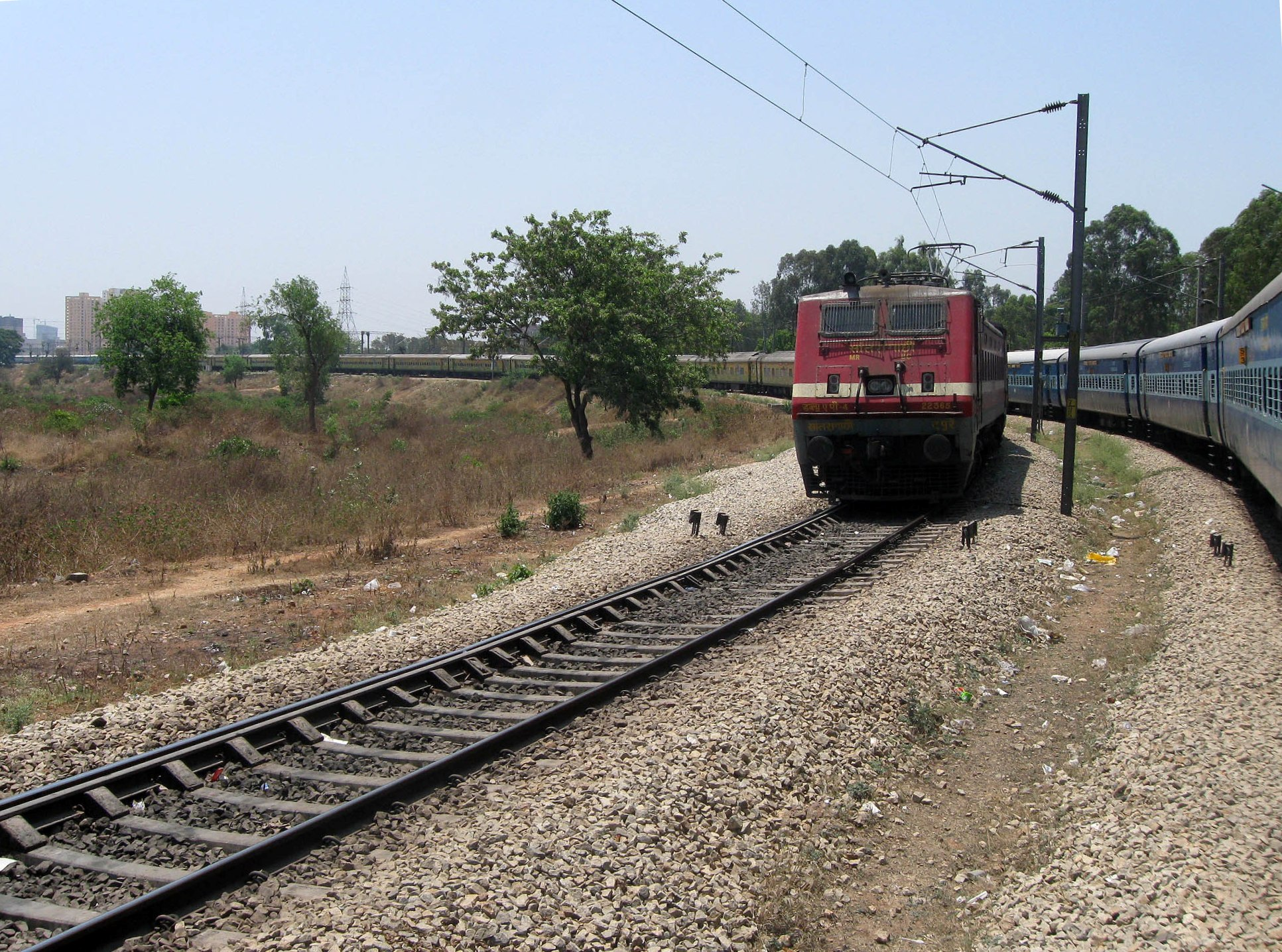
Yeswanthapur–Howrah Duronto Express leaving Yeswanthapur railway station

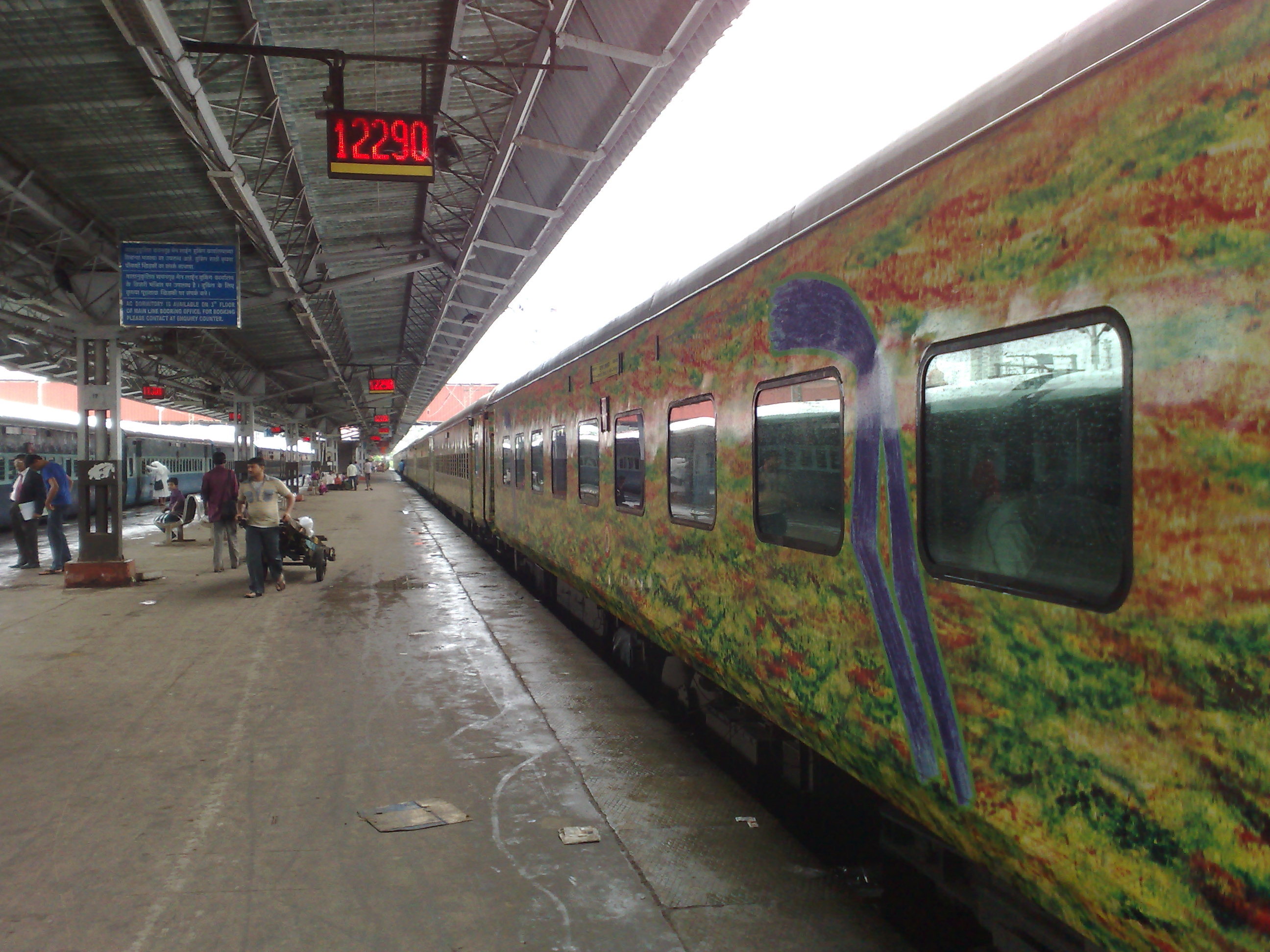
12290 Nagpur Duronto Express at Mumbai CST station

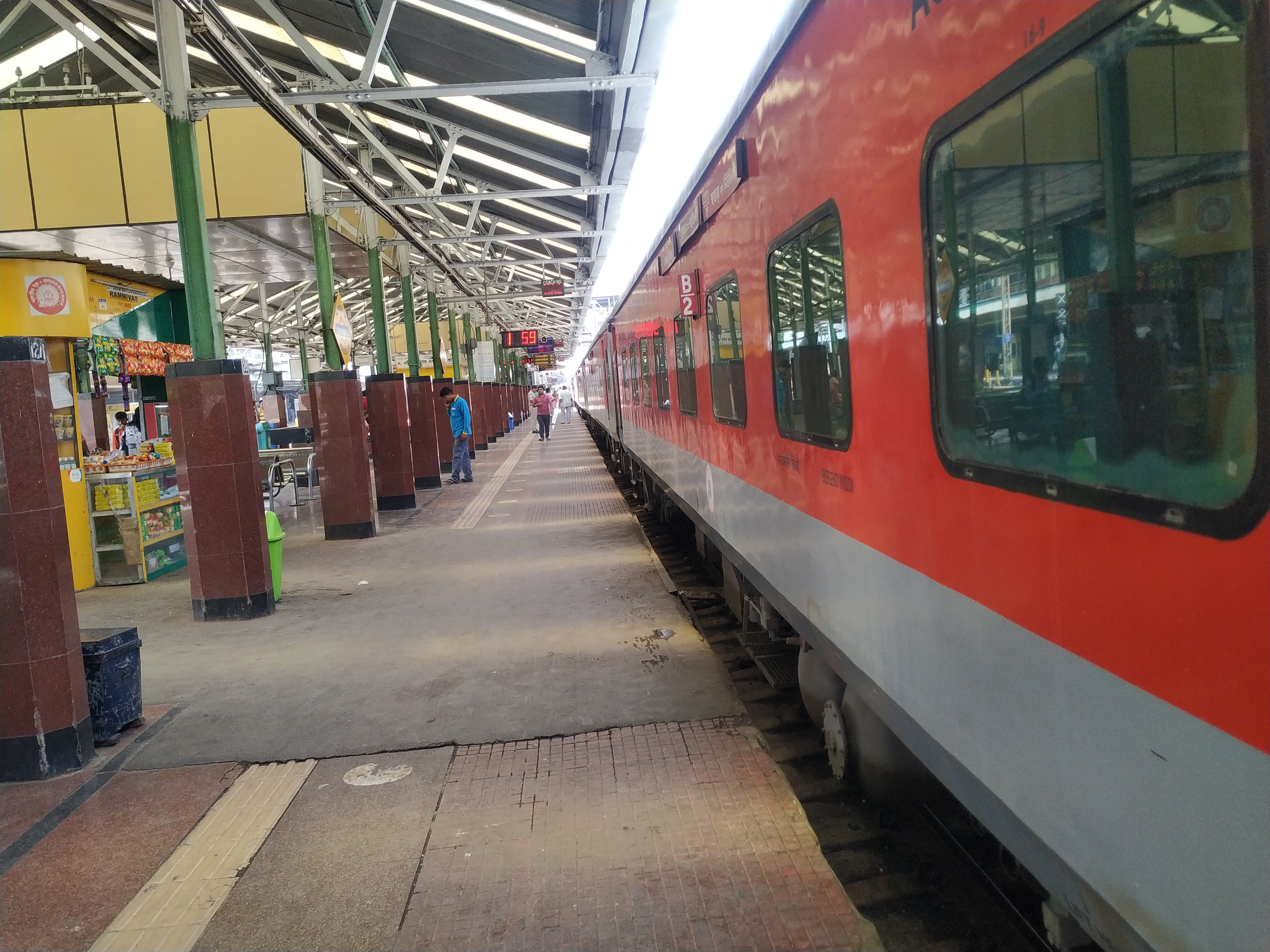
12273 Howrah-New Delhi Duronto Express standing on platform 4 of Asansol Junction

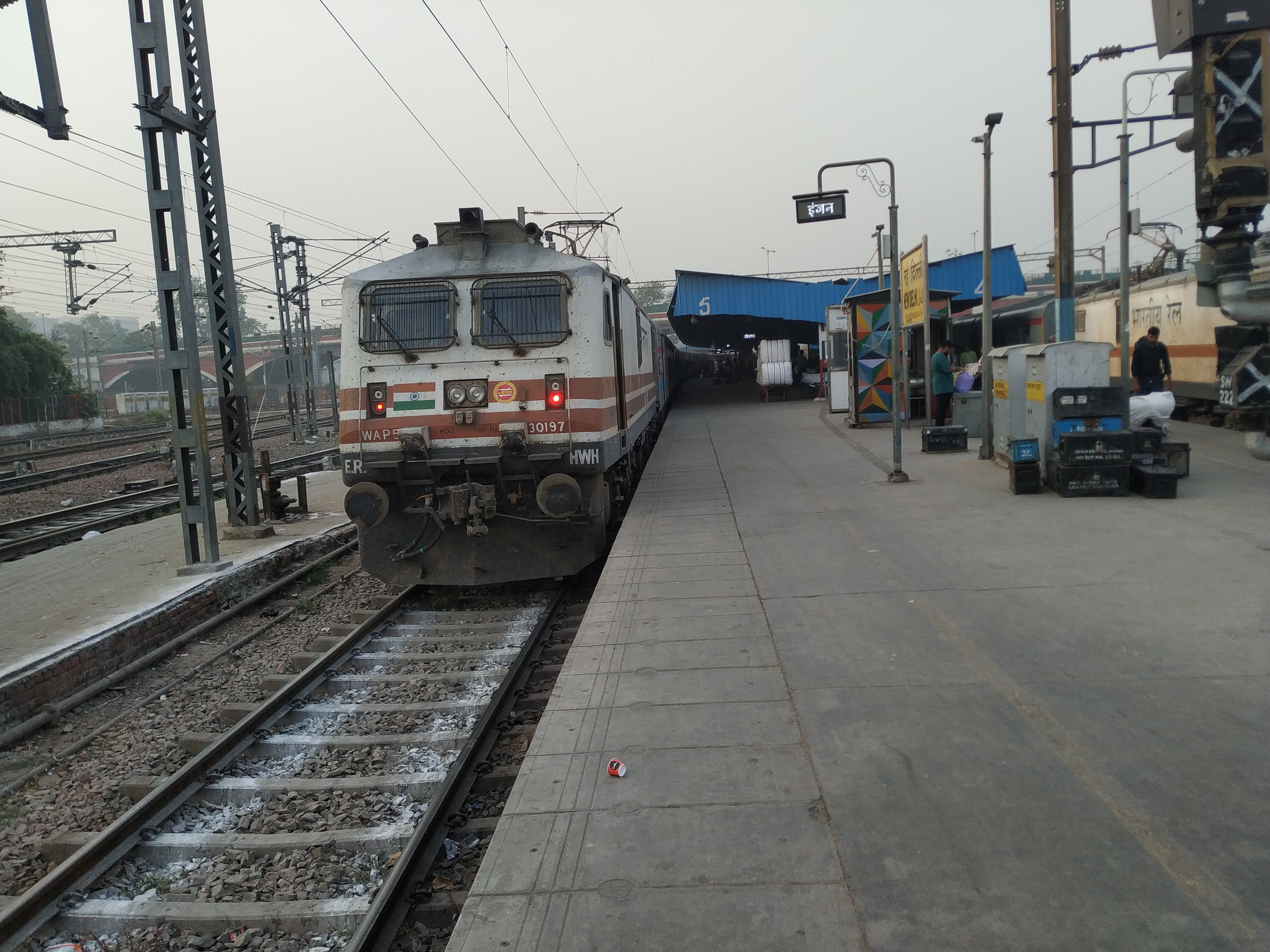
12273 Howrah-New Delhi Duronto Express led by WAP 5 standing on Platform 5 at New Delhi Railway Station

== Trivia ==
- Sealdah–Bikaner Duronto Express was not only the first Duronto service to Bikaner but also the first connecting New Delhi and Bikaner.
- Howrah–New Delhi Duronto Express which is equal to the Rajdhani Express gets top-most priority on the route, making it the fastest train in the Howrah–Delhi route.
- This train was used Hybrid LHB coaches, but the train equipped LHB coaches rakes.
- The name "Duronto" means "restless" in Bengali, reflecting its initial concept of running non-stop between its origin and destination.
- Duronto coaches are easily identifiable by their bright yellow-green color scheme, which was chosen to symbolize a "field full of flowers."
- The Ernakulam–Hazrat Nizamuddin Duronto Express is one of the longest-running Duronto trains in terms of distance, connecting Kochi to New Delhi, covering over 2900 km.

== Efficiency and speed ==
The Duronto Express is one of the fastest trains in India. Some of these trains run faster than Rajdhani Express trains, which hold the record of the fastest long-distance trains in India. For example, the Chennai–Hazrat Nizamuddin Duronto Express takes 28 hours to cover the journey while the Chennai Rajdhani Express takes 28 hours 35 minutes to do so. The trains will adhere to the speed limit of 130 km/h. New Delhi–Sealdah Duronto Express has a top speed of 130 km/h. The Mumbai, Sealdah, Yeshwantpur and Secundrabad Duronto runs at a speed of 130 km/h. The Howrah/Bhubaneshwar New Delhi, Secunderabad Hazrat Nizamuddin are now equipped with LHB rakes and now they also run at a speed of 130 km/h. In March 2011, the cost of travel in the Duronto Express went up as the Minister of Railways announced a hike in railway fare. The decision to hike railway fares resulted in trouble across the Government and were rolled back, only to be raised again on 1 April.

== Incidents and accidents ==
- In January 2010, the passengers of the Duronto Express between Nagpur and Mumbai complained about passengers without confirmed tickets travelling inside the reserved coaches.
- In May 2010, at least 19 passengers on board the Ernakulam Duronto Express were admitted to the Government General Hospital after complaining of food poisoning.
- In June 2010, the Mumbai CST–Howrah Duronto Express faced interruption as its engine and generator car were detached from the rest of the train's coaches due to technical problems. The problem was fixed within less than an hour.
- In June 2013, the 12264 Hazrat Nizamuddin–Pune Duronto derailed near Monkey Hill due to a landslide. No injuries were reported & the train reached 5 hours late at Pune Junction.
- In September 2015, 12220 Lokmanya Tilak Terminus–Secunderabad AC Duronto Express derailed at Martur station between Shahbad and Gulbarga on Solapur Division in Karnataka at around 02:15. Two passengers were killed and more than 30 injured when eight of its coaches were derailed.
- On 29 August 2017 12290 Nagpur Duronto Express heading towards Mumbai derailed between Vasind and Asangaon stations at 06.30 as heavy rains had caused mud slides onto the tracks which caused the derailment. No casualties were reported in an official statement by the Railway department.
- On 17 January 2019 unidentified persons entered into Jammu-Delhi Duronto near Badli, Delhi and looted the passengers.
- On 10 May 2019 engine failure caused late departure of the train from Mumbai central by an hour.
- On 11 August 2019 Yeshvantapur–Delhi Sarai Rohilla AC Duronto Express was cancelled due to "unavoidable circumstances".
- On 24 April 2019 12274 Howrah–New Delhi Duronto Express led by Howrah WAP-7 30370 ran over cattle while at MPS near Jamtara, Jharkhand. The locomotive failed and was backed by ABB made GZB WAP-5 30009, but due to throttle issues it too needed help. A banker Locomotive, GMO WAG-9 31932 was attached. No passenger casualties/injuries were reported. This was a rare incident where all three types of locomotives equipped with 3-phase technology were seen hauling one train.
- On 16 October 2022 More than 20 armed robbers reportedly climbed onto a Delhi-Kolkata Duronto Express train early on Sunday. Several passengers were allegedly looted at gunpoint by the robbers who climbed onto at least six-seven bogies of the train.

== See also ==
- Vande Bharat Express
- Amrit Bharat Express
- Mahamana Express
- Rajdhani Express
- Shatabdi Express
- Humsafar Express
- Sampark Kranti Express
- Jan Shatabdi Express
- Jan Sadharan Express
- Garib Rath Express
- Rajya Rani Express
- Kavi Guru Express
- Vivek Express
- Yuva Express
