= Sealdah–Bikaner Duronto Express =

Train in India

Sealdah - Bikaner Junction Duronto Express
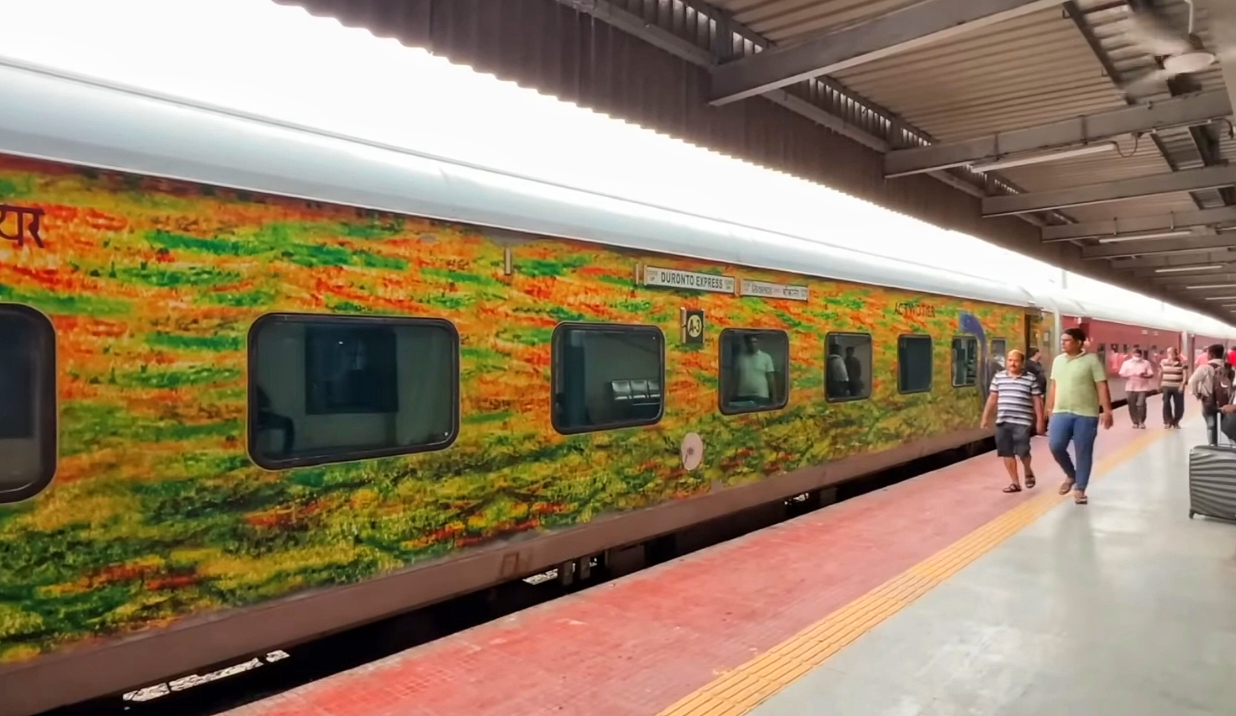
- Sealdah Duronto Express At Rewari Junction

Overview
- Service type: Duronto Express
- First service: 18 September 2009; 17 years ago 24 February 2020; 6 years ago Extended to Bikaner
- Current operator: Eastern Railways

Route
- Termini: Sealdah (SDAH); Bikaner (BKN)
- Stops: 12
- Distance travelled: 1,921 km (1,194 mi)
- Average journey time: 25 hours
- Service frequency: 4 Days a week.
- Train number: 12259 / 12260

On-board services
- Classes: AC First Class, AC 2 Tier, AC 3 Tier
- Seating arrangements: No
- Sleeping arrangements: Yes
- Catering facilities: Available
- Observation facilities: Large windows
- Baggage facilities: Available
- Other facilities: Below the seats

Technical
- Rolling stock: LHB coach
- Track gauge: 1,676 mm (5 ft 6 in)
- Operating speed: 77 km/h (48 mph) Average including halts.

The 12259 / 12260 Sealdah-Bikaner Duronto Express is a premium train of the Duronto Express category belonging to Indian Railways - Eastern Railway zone that runs between Sealdah and Bikaner in India.It operates as train number 12259 from Sealdah to Bikaner and as train number 12260 in the reverse direction serving the states of West Bengal, Jharkhand, Bihar, Uttar Pradesh, Delhi, Haryana and Rajasthan. It used to run as New Delhi - Sealdah Duronto Express and was the first Duronto Express to be launched as announced in the Railway budget of 2008/09. On 24 February 2020, it was extended beyond New Delhi to Bikaner, thereby becoming not only the first Duronto service to Bikaner but also one connecting New Delhi and Bikaner. It was the fastest Duronto Express in India when it operated from Sealdah to New Delhi. It is the second fastest train to connect New Delhi to Kolkata by rail.

== Coaches ==
The 12259 / 60 Sealdah Bikaner Duronto Express presently has one AC First Class, four AC 2 tier, twelve AC 3 tier, two End on Generator Car & one Pantry car coach.

As is customary with most train services in India, Coach Composition may be amended at the discretion of Indian Railways depending on demand.

== Service ==
The 12259 Sealdah Bikaner Duronto Express covers the distance of 1,921 km (1,194 mi) in 25 hours 20 minutes, at an average speed of 76 km/h (47 mph), and in 25 hours 0 minutes as 12260 Bikaner Sealdah Duronto Express, an average speed of 77 km/h (48 mph). As the average speed of the train is above 55 km/h (34 mph), as per Indian Railways rules, its fare includes a superfast surcharge.

== Routing and technical halts ==
The 12259/12260 Sealdah - Bikaner Duronto Express runs from Sealdah to Bikaner Junction through the Dhanbad Junction, Koderma Junction, Gaya Junction, PT. Deen Dayal Upadhyay Junction, Kanpur Central, New Delhi, Loharu, Sadulpur, Churu & Ratangarh.

== Traction ==
As the route is fully electrified, it is hauled by a Howrah Loco Shed or Sealdah Loco Shed based WAP-7 electric locomotive from Sealdah to Bikaner Junction and vice versa.

== Termination ==
The train was terminated by Indian Railways after its final run from Bikaner to Sealdah on 24 May 2021, due to low occupancy and safety compromises amidst the COVID-19 pandemic. The train again started its run from 9 June 2021 .

== Gallery ==
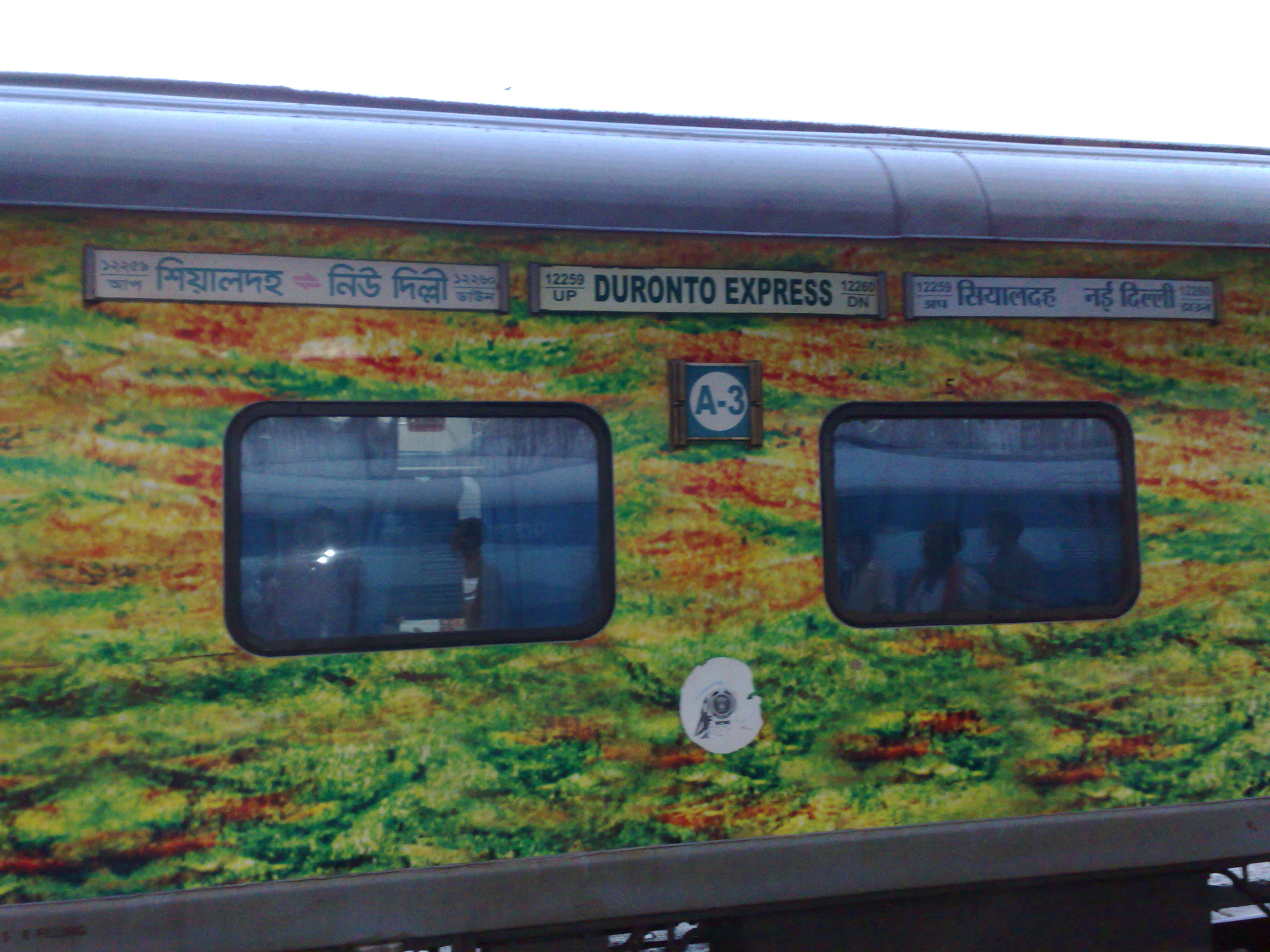
12259 Sealdah Duronto Express - AC 2 tier

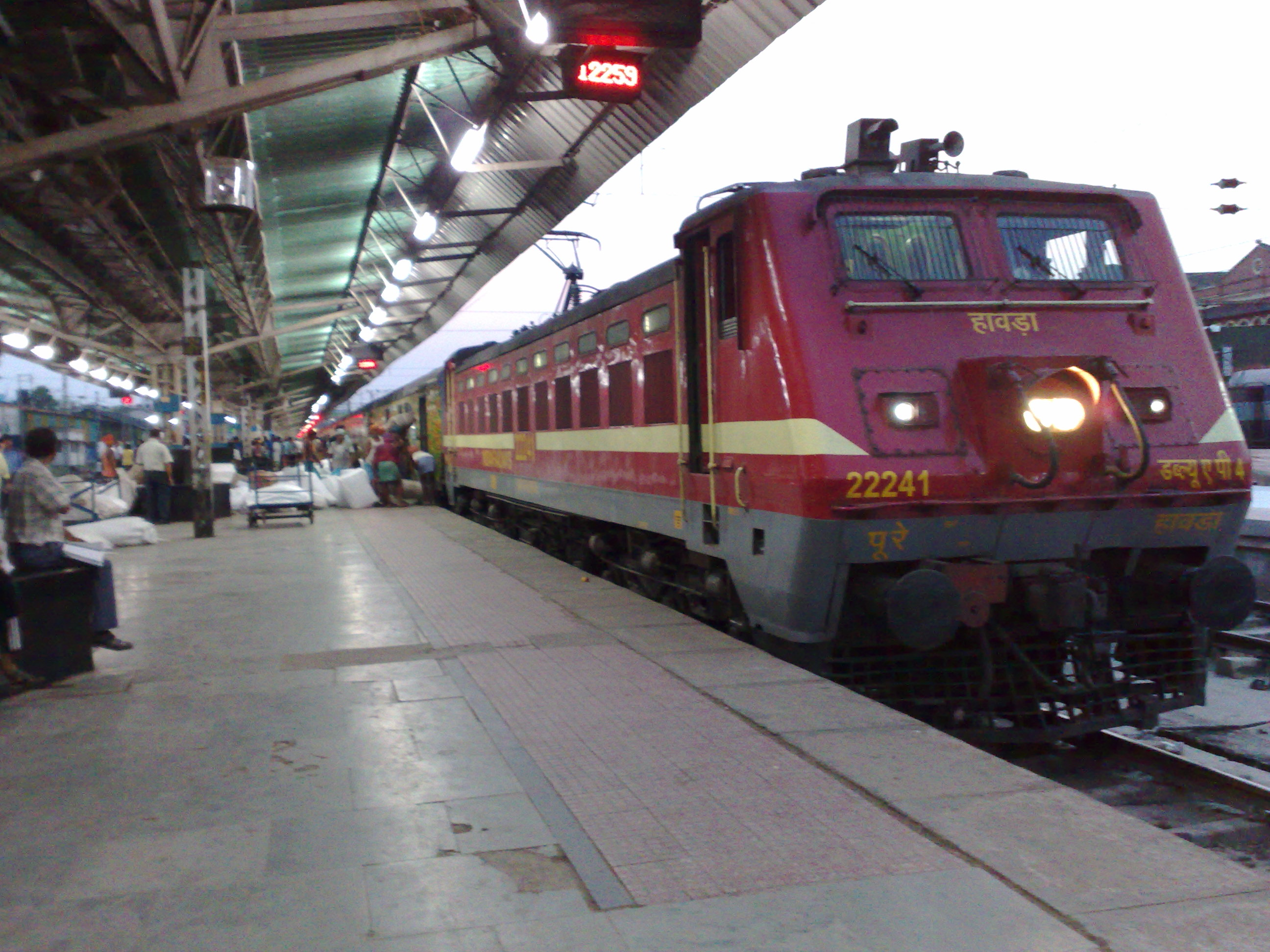
12259 Sealdah Duronto Express with its WAP 4 engine

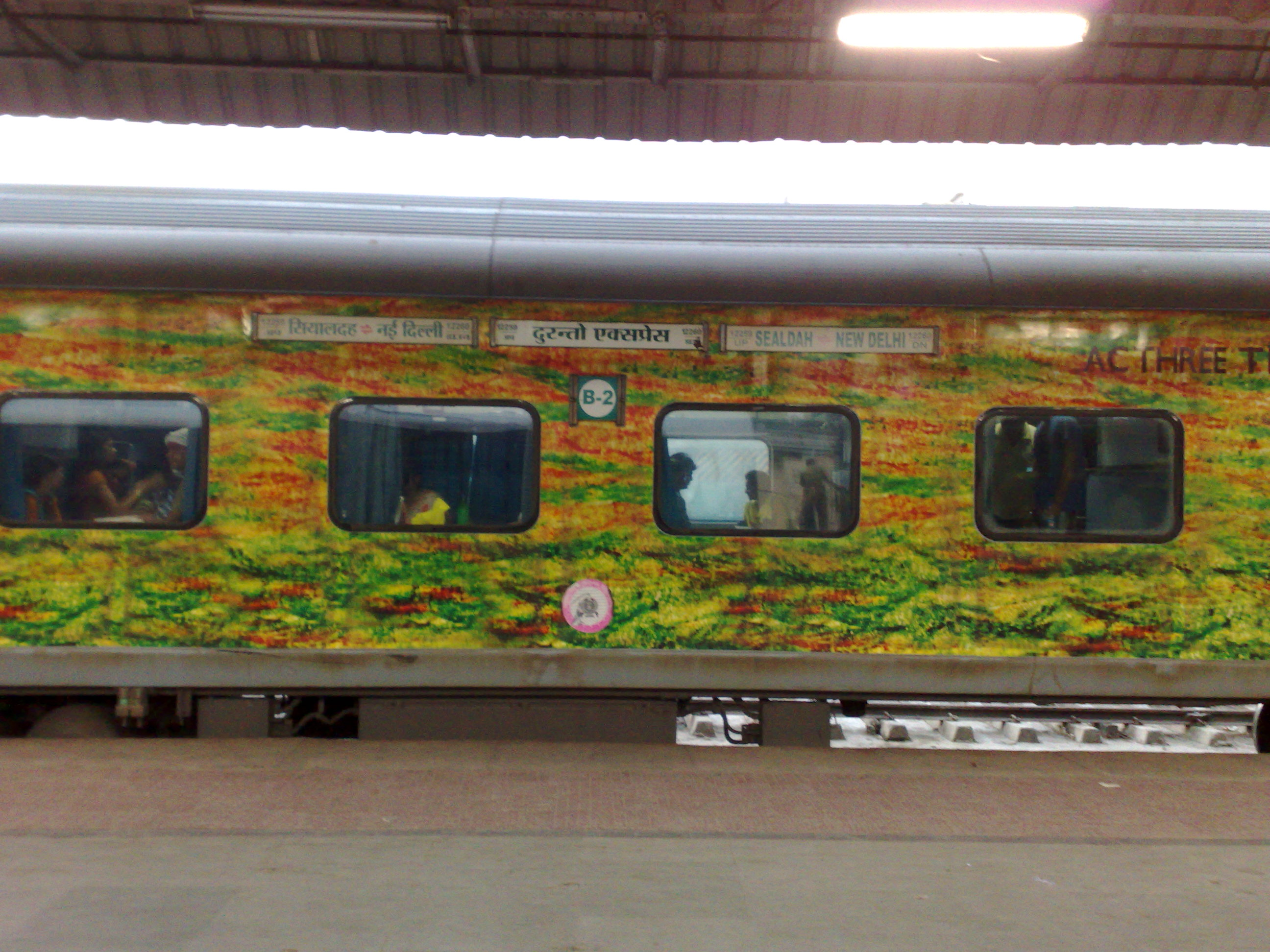
12259 Sealdah Duronto Express - AC 3 tier

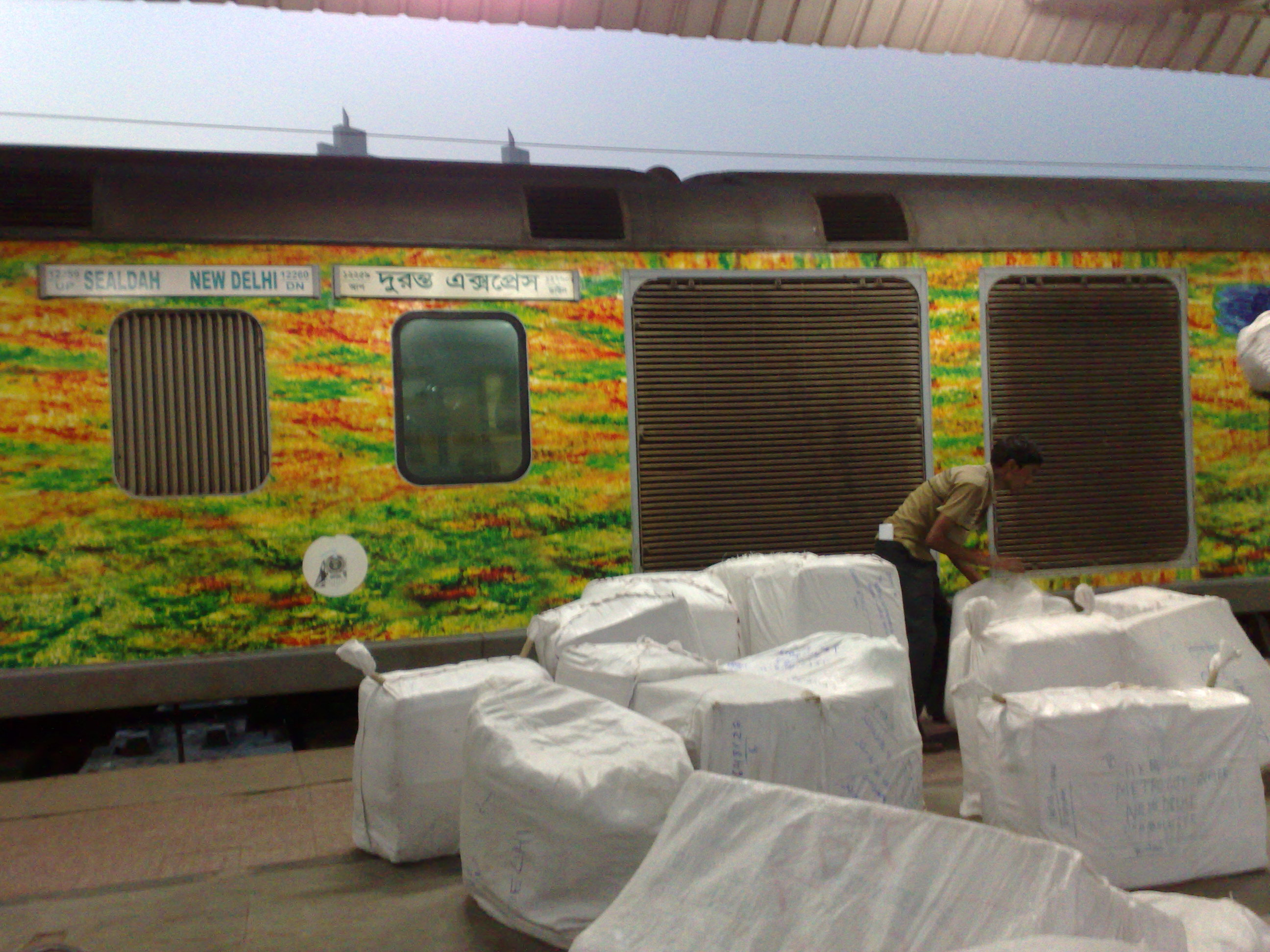
12259 Sealdah Duronto Express - EOG car

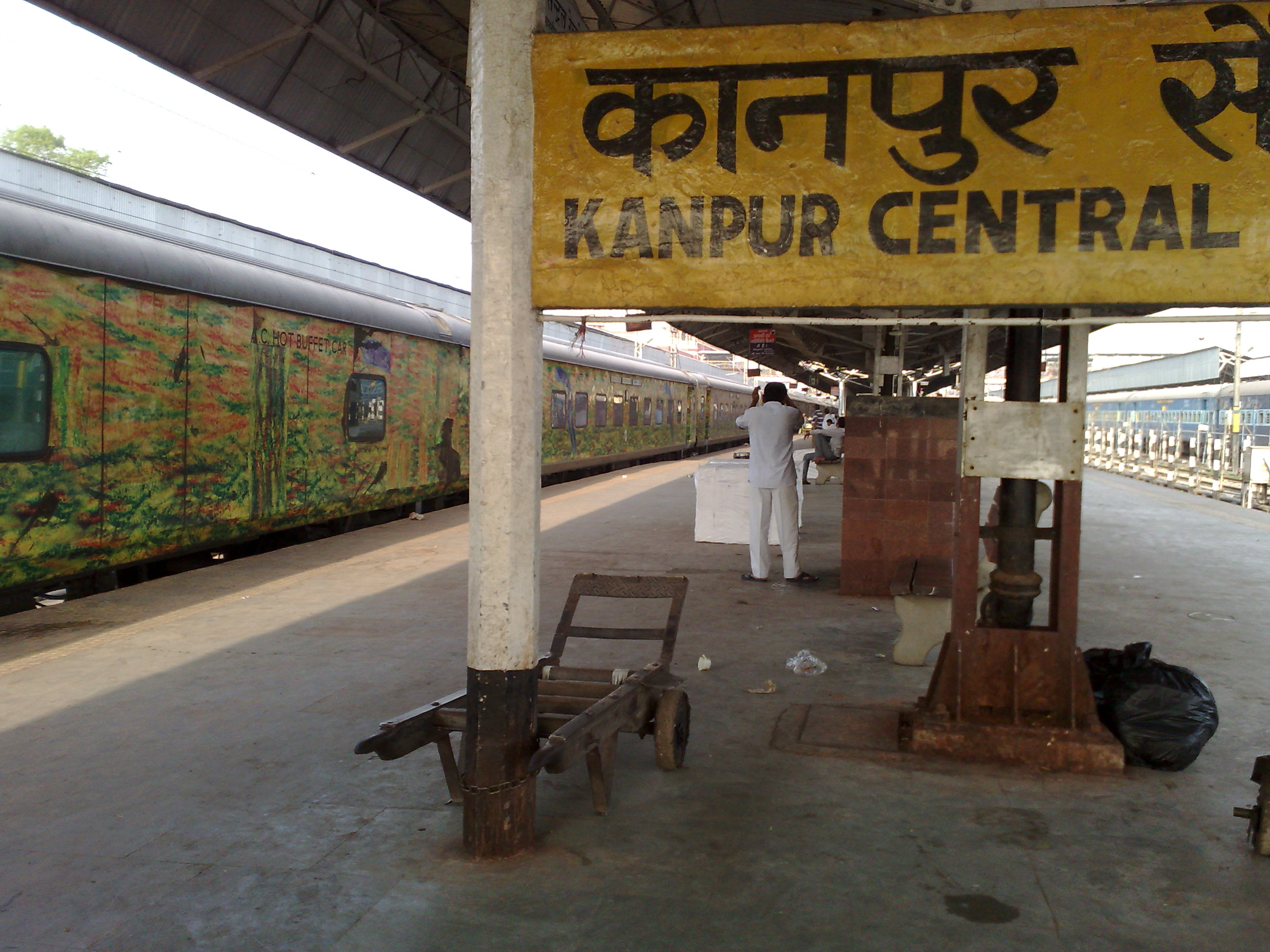
12259 Sealdah Duronto Express at Kanpur Central
