= Yesvantpur–Delhi Sarai Rohilla AC Duronto Express =

Duronto Express train in India

Yesvantpur - Delhi Sarai Rohilla AC Duronto Express
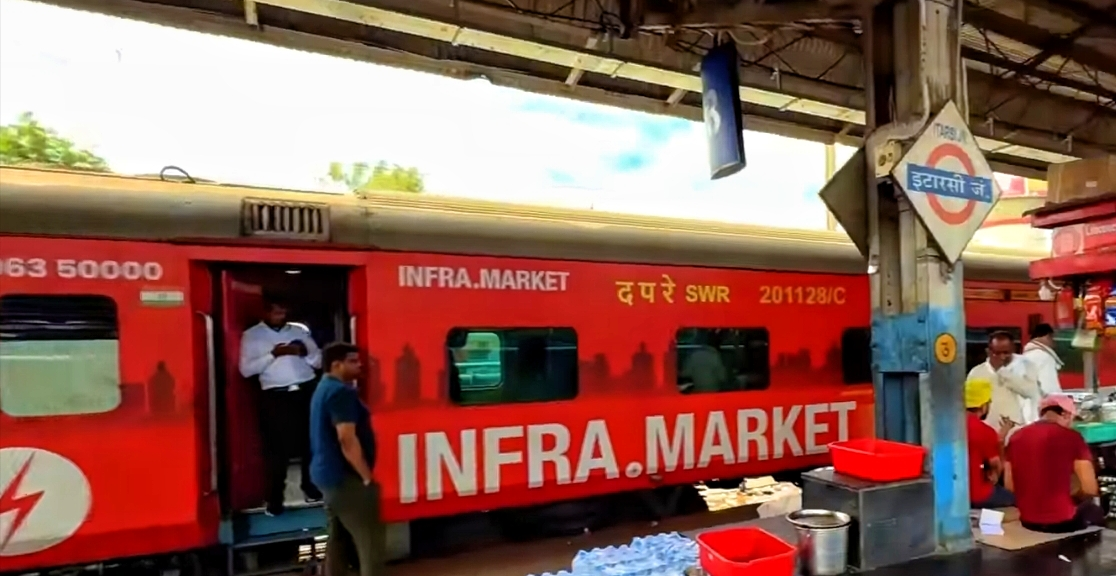
- Yesvantpur Duronto Express At Itarsi Junction

Overview
- Service type: Duronto Express
- Status: Weekly Service
- First service: 19 February 2011
- Current operator: South Western Railways
- Ridership: Weekly Service

Route
- Termini: Yesvantpur Junction (YPR); Delhi Sarai Rohilla (DEE)
- Stops: 5
- Distance travelled: 2,367 km (1,471 mi)
- Average journey time: 31 hours 20 minutes as 12213 Yeshvantapur–Delhi Sarai Rohilla AC Duronto Express, 32 hours 55 minutes as 12214 Delhi Sarai Rohilla–Yeshvantapur AC Duronto Express
- Service frequency: Weekly. 12213 Yeshvantapur–Delhi Sarai Rohilla AC Duronto Express – Saturday. 12214 Delhi Sarai Rohilla–Yeshvantapur AC Duronto Express – Monday.
- Train number: 12213 / 12214

On-board services
- Classes: AC 1st Class, AC 2 tier, AC 3 tier
- Seating arrangements: Yes
- Sleeping arrangements: Yes
- Auto-rack arrangements: Upper
- Catering facilities: Pantry car attached
- Baggage facilities: Overhead

Technical
- Rolling stock: LHB coach
- Track gauge: 1,676 mm (5 ft 6 in)
- Electrification: Fully Electrified
- Operating speed: 130 km/h (81 mph) (maximum speed), 75 km/h (47 mph) (average speed), including halts

The 12213 / 12214 Yesvantpur - Delhi Sarai Rohilla - Yesvantpur AC Duronto Express is a Superfast Express train of the Duronto Express category belonging to the Indian Railways – South Western Railway zone that runs between Yesvantpur Junction and Delhi Sarai Rohilla in India. It is the fastest train from Bangalore to Delhi, covering the route in just 31 hours.

It operates as train number 12213 from Yesvantpur Junction to Delhi Sarai Rohilla and as train number 12214 in the reverse direction, serving the states of Karnataka, Andhra Pradesh, Telangana, Maharashtra, Madhya Pradesh, Uttar Pradesh & Delhi.

It is the only train which passes the major stations of Hazrat Nizamuddin & New Delhi without halting at either of them. The Yesvantpur–Delhi Sarai Rohilla AC Duronto Express had the 2nd longest non-stop run Between Rani Kamalapati-Balharshah Junction (used to stop at Nagpur only for a technical halt), but as of August 23, 2023 Experimental Halt is provided at Nagpur Junction.

== Coaches ==
The 12213 / 14 Yesvantpur–Delhi Sarai Rohilla Duronto Express presently has 1 AC 1st Class, 2 AC 2 tier, 16 AC 3 tier & 2 End on Generator coaches. In addition, it also carries a pantry car.

As is customary with most train services in India, coach composition may be amended at the discretion of Indian Railways depending on demand.

== Service ==
The 12213 Yesvantpur–Delhi Sarai Rohilla Duronto Express covers the distance of 2367 kilometres in 31 hours 20 mins 75.54 km/h (47 mph) & in 32 hours 55 mins as 12214 Delhi Sarai Rohilla–Yeshvantpur Duronto Express 71.91 km/h (45 mph).

As the average speed of the train is above 55 km/h (34 mph), as per Indian Railways rules, its fare includes a Superfast Express surcharge.

== Time table ==
- 12213 Yeshvantapur–Delhi Sarai Rohilla Duronto Express leaves Yeshvantapur Junction every Saturday at 23:40 hrs IST and reaches Delhi Sarai Rohilla at 07:00 hrs IST on the 3rd day.
- 12214 Delhi Sarai Rohilla–Yeshvantapur Duronto Express leaves Delhi Sarai Rohilla every Monday at 23:00 hrs IST and reaches Yeshvantapur Junction at 07:55 hrs IST on the 3rd day.

Yesvantapur–Delhi Sarai Rohilla AC Duronto Express
12213		Stations	12214	
Arrival	Departure	Stations	Arrival	Departure
07:35	----	Delhi Sarai Rohilla	----	22:10
01:30	01:35	Jhansi Junction	03:50	03:55
22:02	22:10	Rani Kamalapati	08:02	08:10
16:10	16:15	Nagpur Junction	13:35	13:42
13:35	13:40	Balharshah Junction	16:40	16:45
08:45	08:50	Secunderabad junction	20:55	21:10
03:30	03:35	Guntakal Junction	02:45	02:50
02:08	02:12	Dharmavaram Junction (Technical Halt)	04:37	04:42
----	23:40	Yesvantpur Junction	08:10	----

== Traction ==
Due to partial electrification, upon introduction until around 6 November 2017, the 12213 / 14 Yesvantpur–Delhi Sarai Rohilla Duronto Express was hauled by a Krishnarajapuram-based WDP-4B/WDP-4D and WDM-3D from Yesvantpur Junction up to Secunderabad Junction handing over to a Lallaguda-based WAP-7 which would power the train up to its destination Delhi Sarai Rohilla.

With progressive electrification, it started being hauled end to end haul by a Lallaguda-based WAP-7 locomotive.

Ever since SWR's Krishnarajapuram (KJM) shed received WAP-7 locomotives, this train is being hauled end to end by a Krishnarajapuram-based WAP-7 locomotive.

== Gallery ==
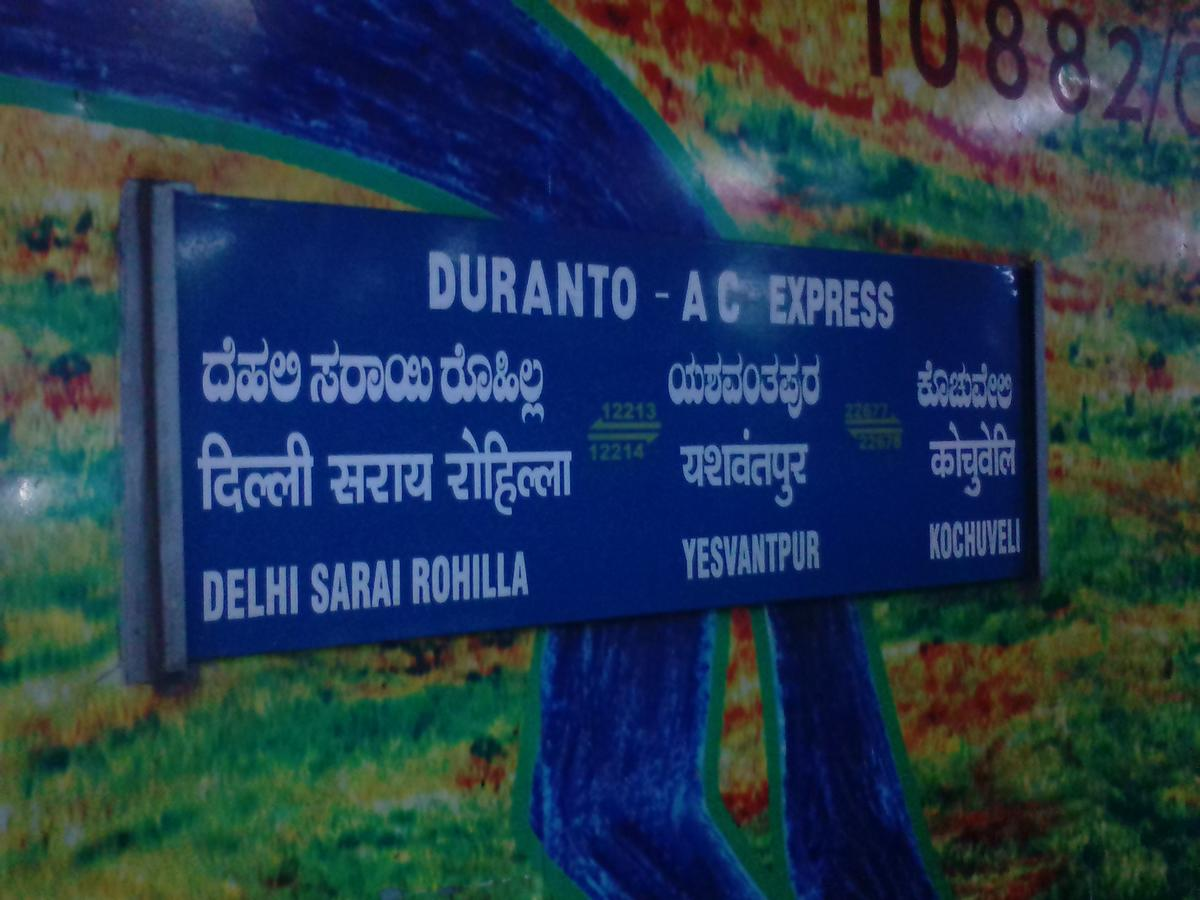
Train Board

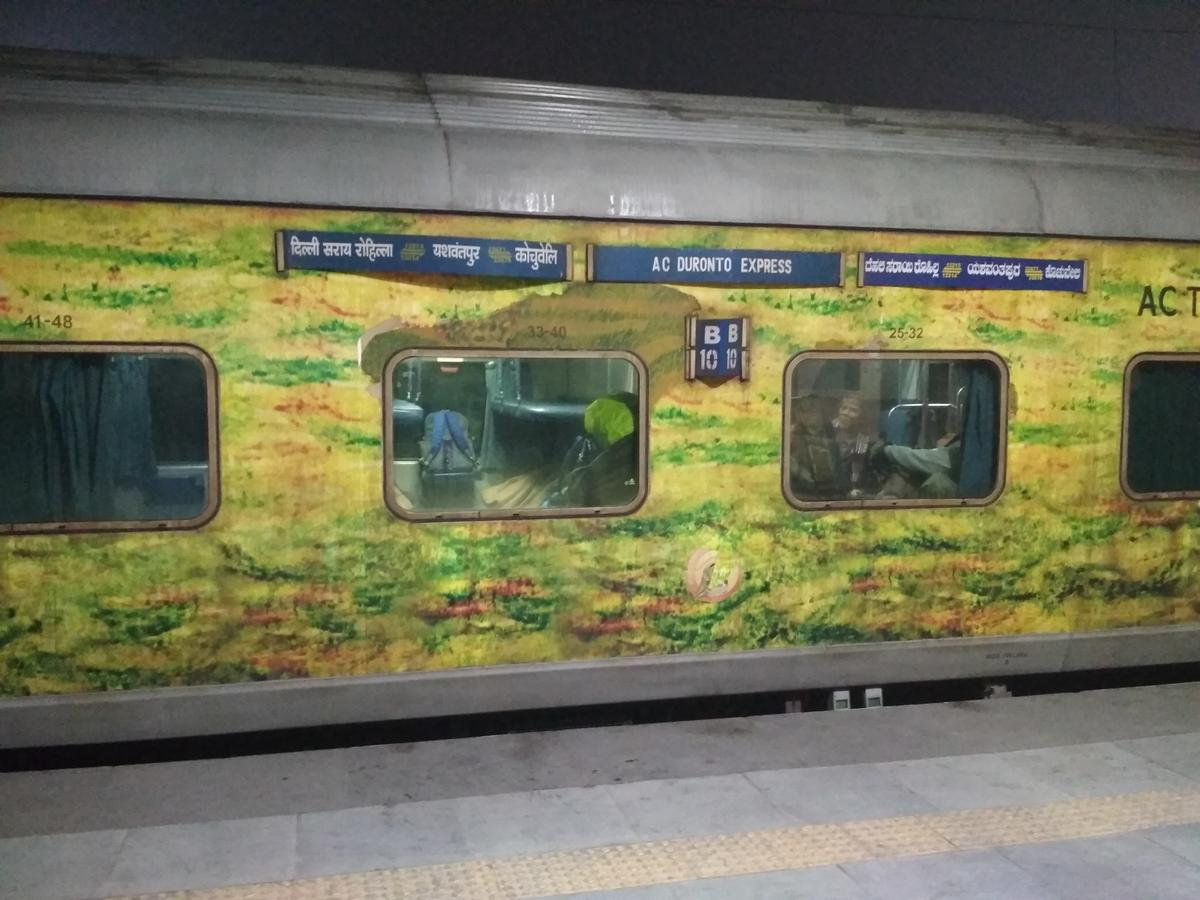
At Secunderabad Junction

== Rake sharing ==
16561/16562 – Thiruvananthapuram North–Yesvantpur AC Express
