= Chennai–Hazrat Nizamuddin Duronto Express =

Express train in India

MGR Chennai Central – Hazrat Nizamuddin Duronto Express
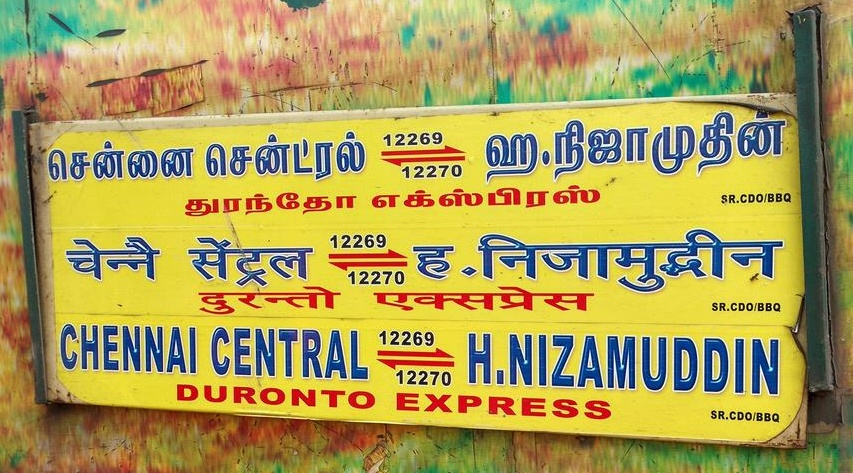

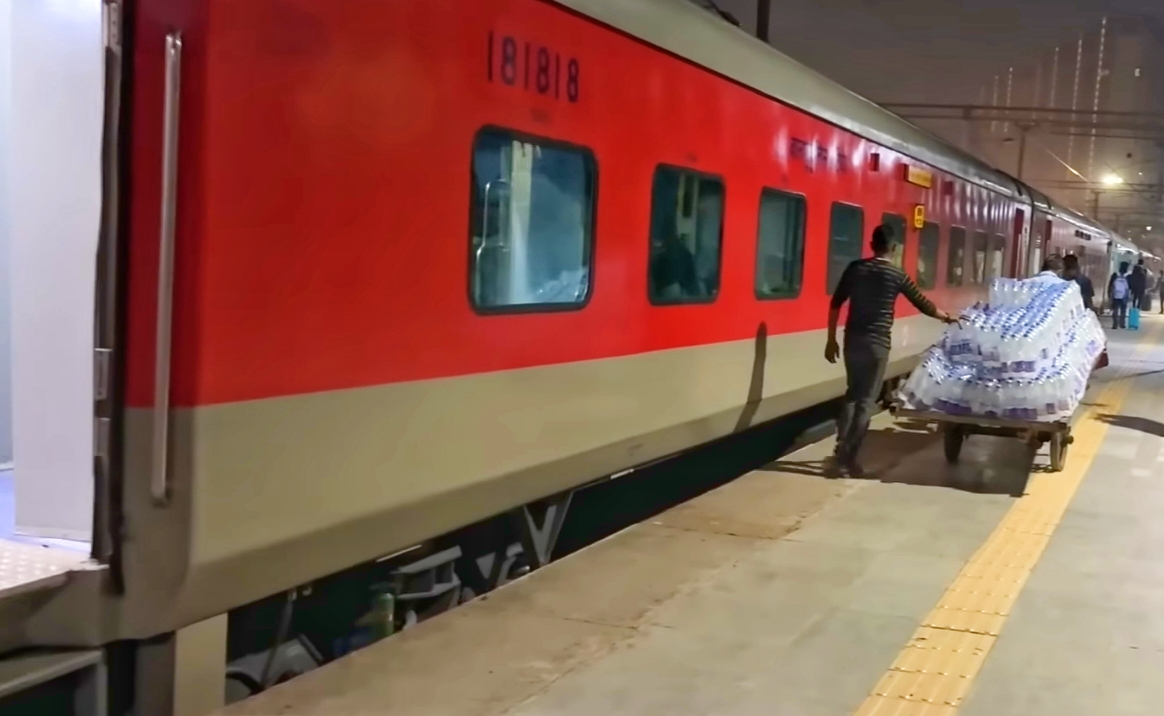
- MGR Chennai Central – Hazrat Nizamuddin Duronto Express At Itarsi Junction railway station

Overview
- Service type: Express, Duronto Express
- First service: 21 September 2009
- Current operator: Southern Railways

Route
- Termini: Chennai Central (MAS); Hazrat Nizamuddin (NZM)
- Stops: 6
- Distance travelled: 2,180 km (1,355 mi)
- Average journey time: 28 hours
- Service frequency: Bi-weekly.
- Train number: 12269 / 12270

On-board services
- Classes: AC 1st Class; AC 2 tier; AC 3 tier; Sleeper class
- Sleeping arrangements: Yes
- Catering facilities: Pantry car attached
- Observation facilities: Runs with LHB coach

Technical
- Rolling stock: Standard Indian Railways Duronto LHB coach coaches
- Track gauge: 1,676 mm (5 ft 6 in)
- Operating speed: 130 km/h (81 mph) (maximum speed), 76.65 km/h (48 mph) (average speed), including halts

The 12269 / 12270 Chennai Central–Hazrat Nizamuddin Duronto Express is an Superfast Express train of the Duronto Express category belonging to Indian Railways – Southern Railway zone that runs between Chennai Central and Hazrat Nizamuddin in India. It is the fastest train between Chennai Central (MAS) to Delhi ( Hazrat Nizamuddin)

It operates as train number 12269 from Chennai Central to Hazrat Nizamuddin and as train number 12270 in the reverse direction, serving the states of Tamil Nadu, Andhra Pradesh, Maharashtra, Madhya Pradesh, Uttar Pradesh & Delhi.

It was part of the Duronto Express series of trains introduced in the 2009–10 railway budget

== Coaches ==
The 12269 / 70 Chennai Central–Hazrat Nizamuddin Duronto Express presently has 1 AC 1st Class, 2 AC 2 tier, 4 AC 3 tier, 8 Sleeper class & 2 End on Generator Coaches. In addition, it also carries a pantry car.

As is customary with most train services in India, coach composition may be amended at the discretion of Indian Railways depending on demand.

== Coach positioning ==
Coach Positioning for 12269 Duronto Express at MGR Chennai Central station is:

LOCe-SLR-S2-S1B10-B9-B8-B7-B6-B5-B4-B3-PC-B12-B1-A2-A1-H1-EOG

Vice versa Coach Positioning at Hazrat Nizamuddin station.

== Service ==
12269 Chennai Central–Hazrat Nizamuddin Duronto Express covers the distance of 2,180 km (1,350 mi) in 27 hours 55 mins averaging 78.09 km/h (49 mph) & 2,175 km (1,351 mi) in 28 hours 55 mins as 12270 Hazrat Nizamuddin–Chennai Central Duronto Express averaging 75.22 km/h (47 mph).

== Routing ==
The 12269 / 70 Chennai Central–Hazrat Nizamuddin Duronto Express runs from Chennai Central via Vijayawada Junction, Balharshah Junction, Nagpur, Rani Kamalapati, Jhansi Junction, Gwalior to Hazrat Nizamuddin .

== Traction ==
It is hauled by a Royapuram based WAP 7 or by Erode based WAP-7 end to end.

== Timings ==
- 12269 Chennai Central–Hazrat Nizamuddin Duronto Express leaves Chennai Central every Monday & Friday reaching Hazrat Nizamuddin the next day.
- 12270 Hazrat Nizamuddin–Chennai Central Duronto Express leaves Hazrat Nizamuddin every Tuesday & Saturday reaching Chennai Central the next day.
