= Ahmedabad–Pune Duronto Express =

Train in India

Pune Junction – Ahmedabad Junction Duronto Express
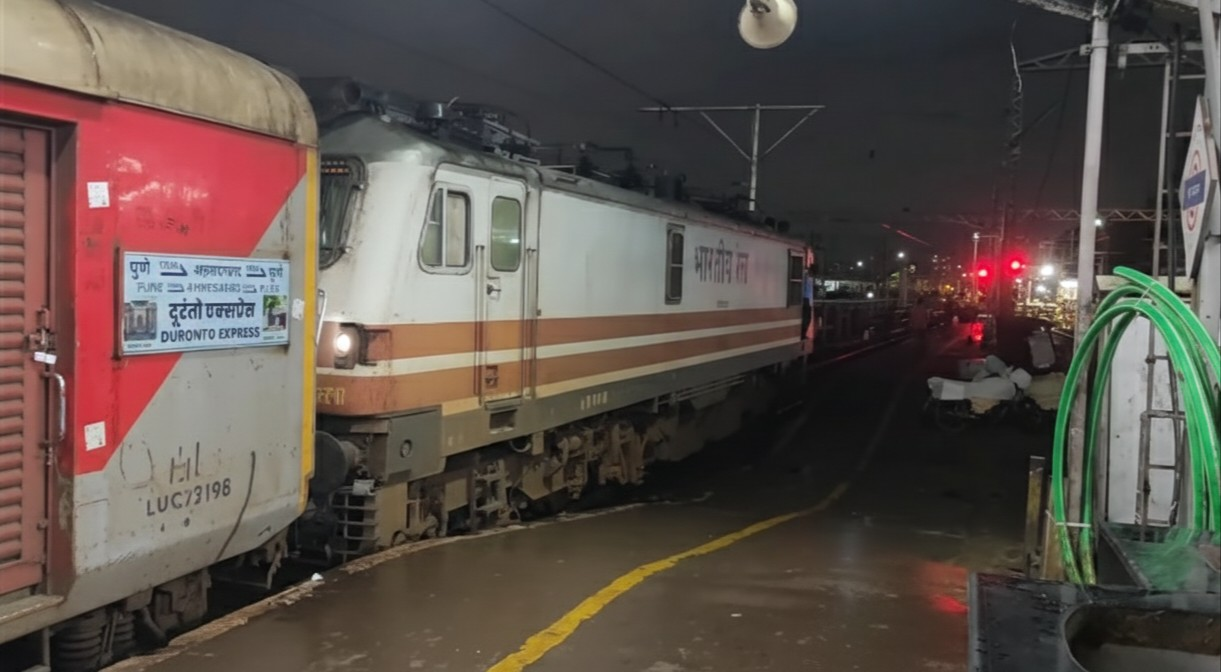
- Pune Ahmedabad Duronto Express departing Pune Junction

Overview
- Service type: Duronto
- Status: Active
- Locale: Gujarat & Maharashtra
- First service: 11 March 2012; 14 years ago
- Current operator: Central Railways

Route
- Termini: Ahmedabad Junction (ADI); Pune Junction (PUNE)
- Stops: 3
- Distance travelled: 635 km (395 mi)
- Average journey time: 8 hours, 40 min
- Service frequency: 3 days a week
- Train number: 12297 / 12298
- Line used: Ahmedabad–Mumbai main line

On-board services
- Class: AC 1st Class, AC 2 tier, AC 3 Tier
- Sleeping arrangements: Yes
- Catering facilities: On-board catering & e-catering
- Observation facilities: Large windows in all carriages

Technical
- Rolling stock: LHB Duronto
- Track gauge: 5 ft 6 in (1,676 mm) broad gauge
- Operating speed: 65 km/h (40 mph) average, 130 km/h (81 mph) maximum

The 12297 /12298 Pune–Ahmedabad Duronto Express is an Express train of Indian Railways Duronto Express class that connects Pune Junction (PUNE) to Ahmedabad Junction (ADI).

It operates as train number 12297 from Ahmedabad Junction to Pune Junction and as train number 12298 in the reverse direction.

== Coach composition ==
The rake has nine AC 3-tier coaches, three AC 2-tier coaches, one AC First Class, and two EOG cars, making a total of fifteen coaches. It does not have a pantry car coach.

As with most train services in India, coach composition may be amended at the discretion of Indian Railways, depending on the demand.

== Coach positioning ==
Coach Positioning of this train at Ahmedabad Junction is:

LOCO-EOG-B1-B2-B3-B4-B5-B6-B7-B8-B9-H1-AQ-A2-A3-SLR

Vice Versa Coach positioning at Pune Junction.

== Traction ==
This train is hauled by WAP-7 of Vadodara Shed. This is one of the only two trains along with 12267/68 Mumbai Central Hapa Duronto Express that skips Vadodara Junction .

== Route and halts ==
• Ahmedabad Junction

• Surat railway station

• Vasai Road

• Lonavla

• Pune Junction

== Train details ==
This train had its inaugural run on 11 March 2012 and it runs with new Duronto rakes.

== See also ==
- Ahimsa Express
- Ahmedabad Junction railway station
- Duronto Express
- Pune Junction railway station
