= Secunderabad–Hazrat Nizamuddin Duronto Express =

Secunderabad – Hazrat Nizamuddin Duronto Express
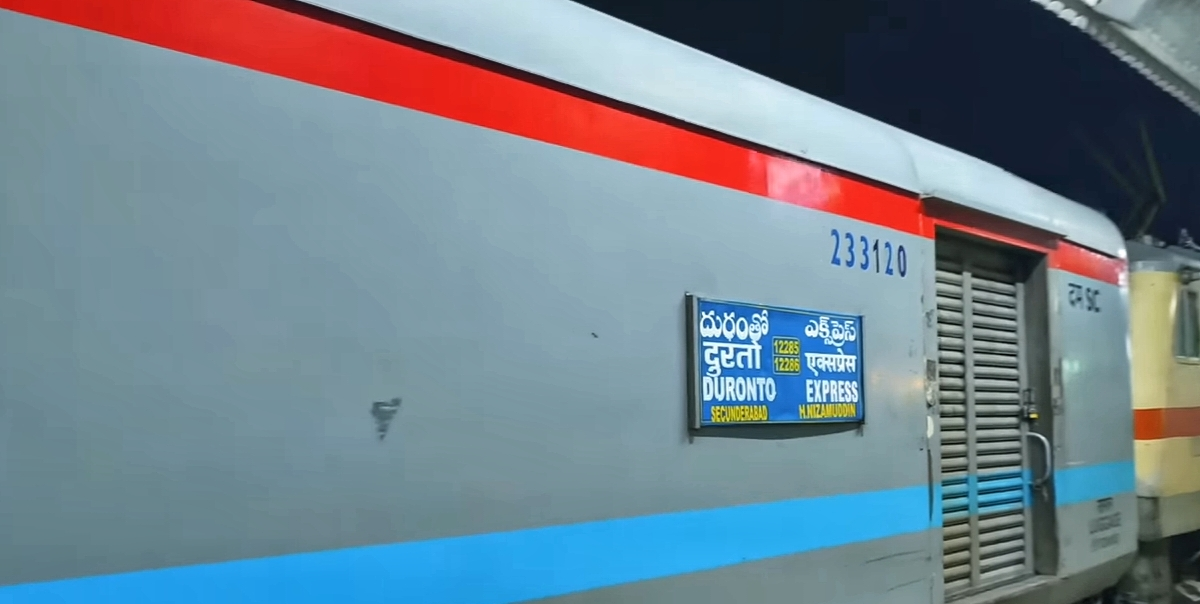
- Secunderabad – Hazrat Nizamuddin Duronto Express At Itarsi Junction railway station

Overview
- Service type: Duronto Express
- Locale: Telangana, Maharashtra, Madhya Pradesh, Uttar Pradesh, Delhi
- First service: 14 March 2003; 22 years ago
- Current operator: Indian Railways (SCR)

Route
- Termini: Secunderabad Junction (SC); Delhi Hazrat Nizamuddin (NZM)
- Stops: 4
- Distance travelled: 1,660 km (1,030 mi)
- Average journey time: 22 hrs 10 mins
- Service frequency: Bi-weekly
- Train number: 12285 / 12286

On-board services
- Class: AC 1, AC 2, AC 3, Sleeper class
- Seating arrangements: Yes
- Sleeping arrangements: Yes
- Catering facilities: Yes

Technical
- Rolling stock: LHB coach
- Track gauge: Broad – 1,676 mm (5 ft 6 in)
- Operating speed: 75.77 km/h (47.08 mph)
Route map
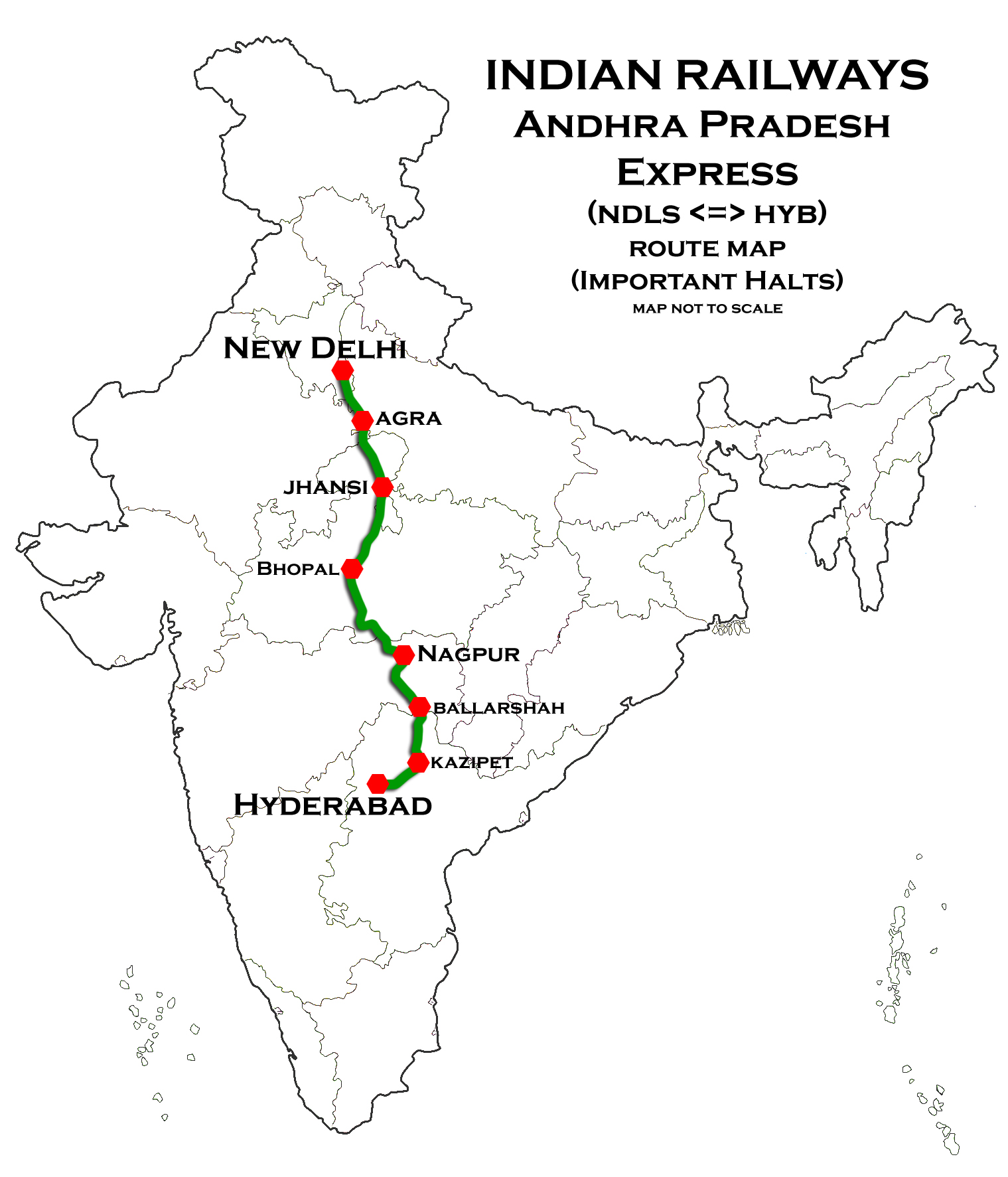

The Secunderabad–Hazrat Nizamuddin Duronto Express is a Duronto Express train of the Indian Railways connecting Secunderabad (SC) to Delhi Hazrat Nizamuddin (NZM). It is the fastest train between New Delhi and Secunderabad with a travel time of 22 hours.

It operates as train number 12285 from Secunderabad Junction to Hazrat Nizamuddin and as train number 12286 in the reverse direction, serving the states of Telangana, Maharashtra, Madhya Pradesh, Uttar Pradesh & Delhi.

== Coaches ==
The 12285 / 86 Secunderabad Hazrat Nizamuddin Duronto Express presently has 1 AC 1st Class, 3 AC 2 tier, 5 AC 3 tier, 8 Slepper Class & 1 End on Generator, 1 SLRD coaches. In addition, it also carries a pantry car.

As is customary with most train services in India, coach composition may be amended at the discretion of Indian Railways depending on demand.

== Locomotive ==
In Both the directions this trains was hauled by a Lallaguda-based WAP-7 locomotive on its entire journey.

== Service ==
The 12285 Secunderabad Hazrat Nizamuddin Duronto Express covers the distance of 1660 kilometres in 22 hours 00 mins 75.00 km/h (47 mph) & in 22 hours 15 mins as 12286 Secunderabad Hazrat Nizamuddin Duronto Express75.00 km/h (47 mph).

As the average speed of the train is above 55 km/h (34 mph), as per Indian Railways rules, its fare includes a Superfast Express surcharge.

== Time table ==
Secunderabad–Hazrat Nizamuddin Duronto Express
12286		Stations	12285	
Arrival	Departure	Stations	Arrival	Departure
----	15:55	Hazrat Nizamuddin	10:50	----
20:45	20:50	Jhansi Junction	05:30	05:35
00:10	00:18	Rani Kamalapati	02:04	02:12
05:35	05:40	Nagpur Junction	20:40	20:45
08:30	08:35	Balharshah Junction	18:00	18:05
14:10	----	Secunderabad junction	----	12:50

== Stoppage ==
- Balharshah
- Nagpur
- Rani Kamalapati
- Jhansi Junction

== Gallery ==
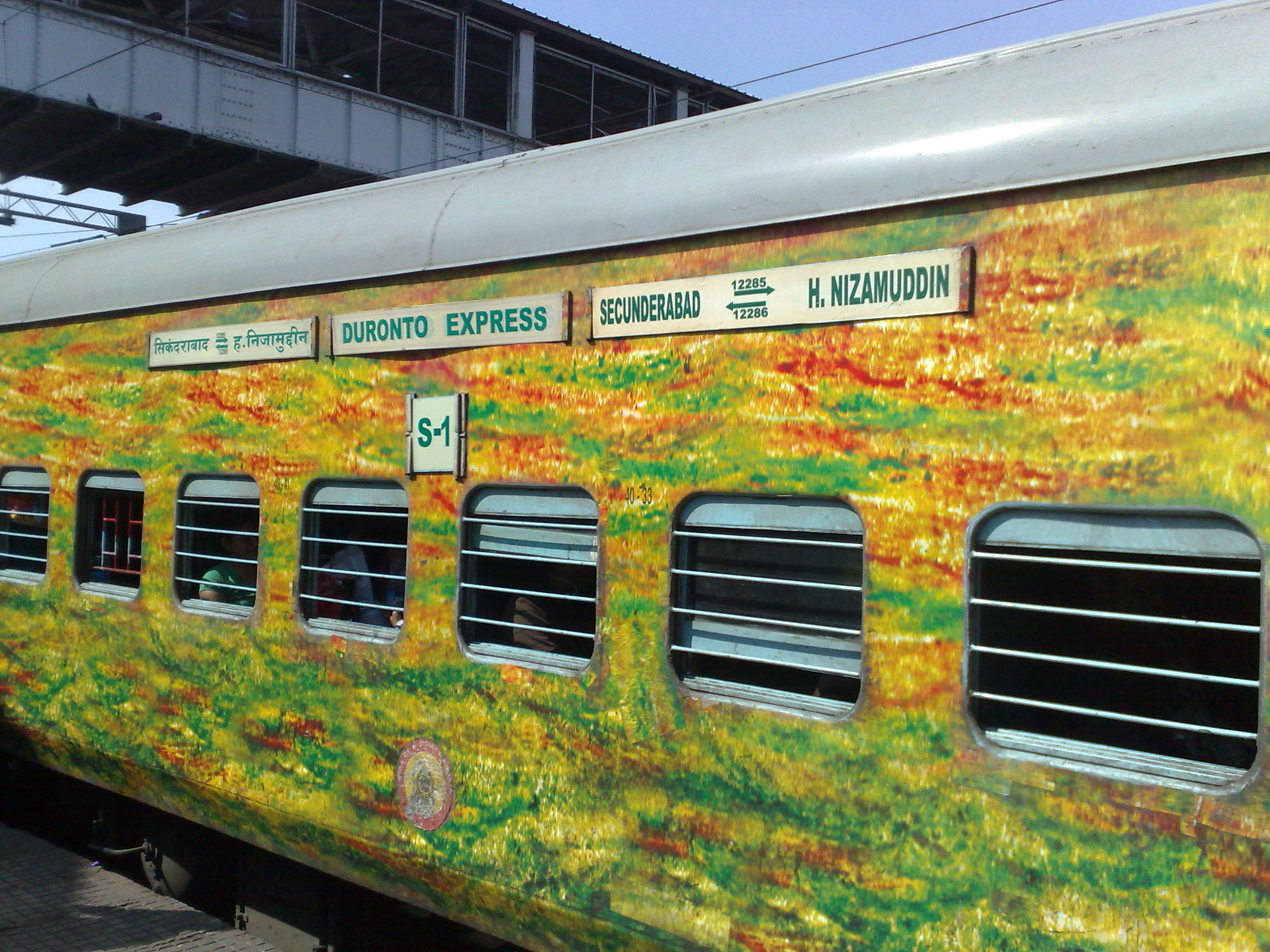
12285 Duronto Express

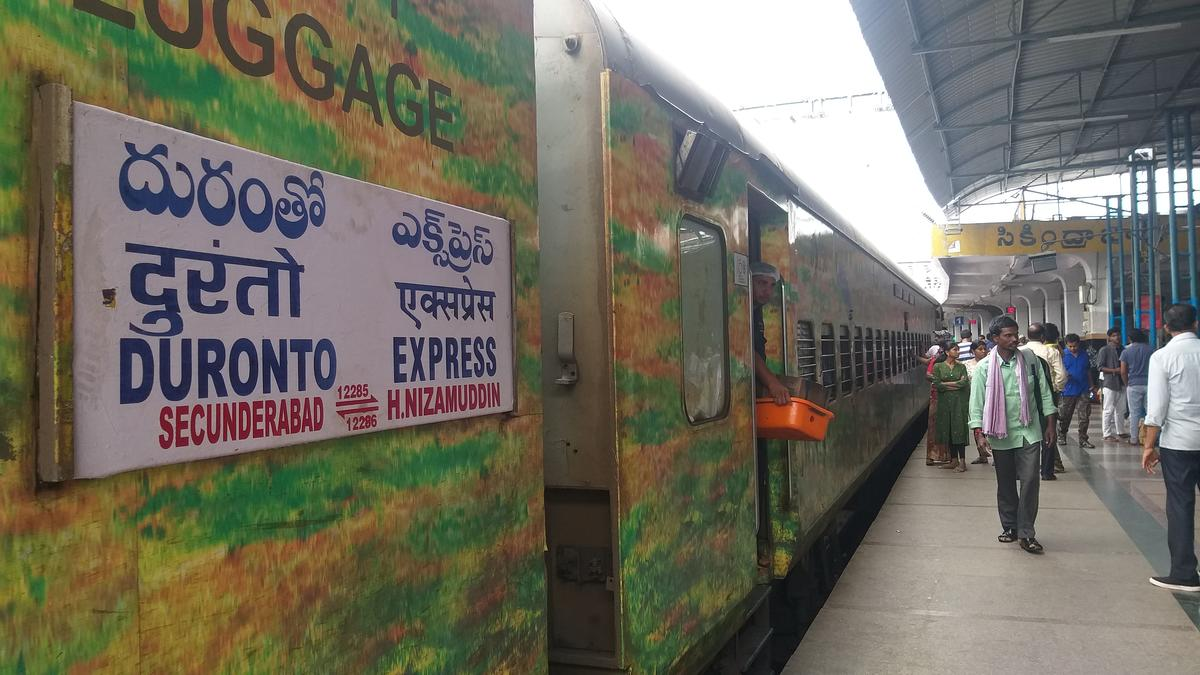
12285 Duronto Express standing at Secunderabad

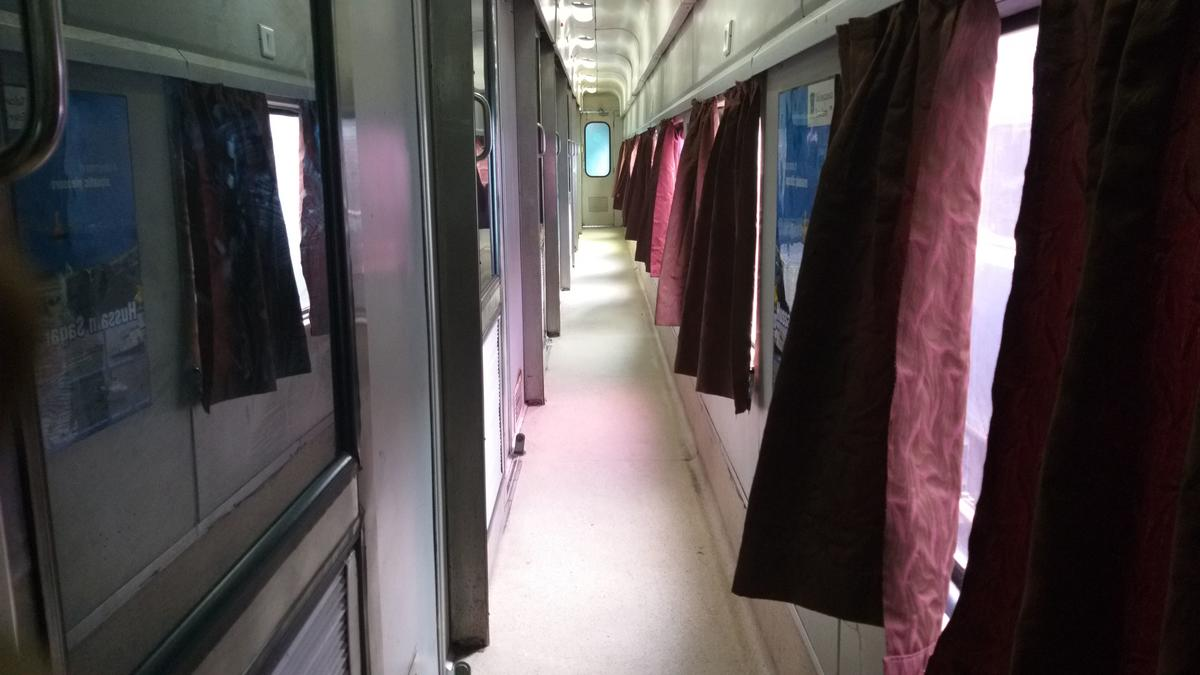
12285 Duronto Express First class AC Interior

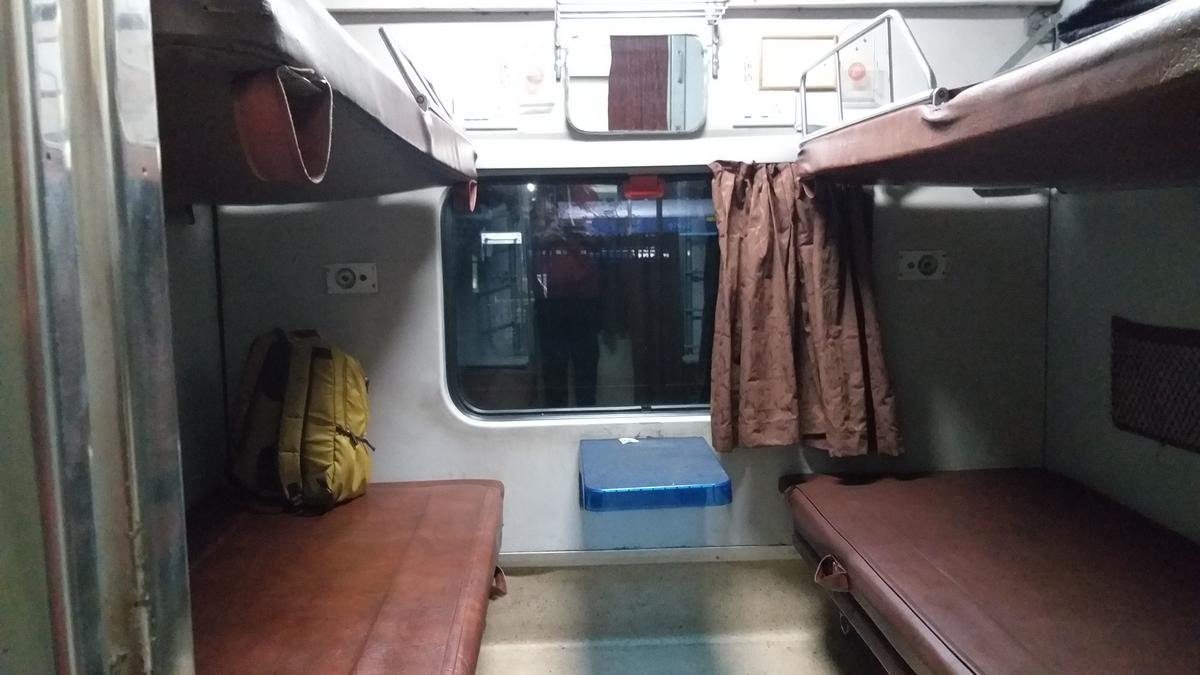
12285 Duronto Express 2nd AC Interior
