= Hisar–Hyderabad Weekly Express =

Train in India

Overview
- Service type: Express
- First service: 10 July 2012; 14 years ago
- Current operator: South Central Railway zone

Route
- Termini: Hisar Junction (HSR); Hyderabad Deccan (HYB)
- Stops: 50
- Distance travelled: 2,352 km (1,461 mi)
- Average journey time: 41h 10m
- Service frequency: Weekly (Note: Runs one day in a week for every direction.)
- Train number: 17020/17019

On-board services
- Classes: AC 1 tier, AC 2 tier, AC 3 tier, Sleeper class, General, Pantry Car, Unreserved
- Seating arrangements: No
- Sleeping arrangements: Yes
- Catering facilities: On-board catering E-catering
- Observation facilities: LHB coach
- Entertainment facilities: No
- Baggage facilities: No
- Other facilities: Below the seats

Technical
- Rolling stock: 2
- Track gauge: 1,676 mm (5 ft 6 in)
- Operating speed: 52.3 km/h (32 mph), including halts

The Hisar–Hyderabad Weekly Express is an express train belonging to South Central Railway zone that runs between Hisar Junction and Hyderabad Deccan in India. It is currently being operated with 17020/17019 train numbers on a weekly basis.

== Service ==
The 17019/Hisar–Hyderabad Weekly Express has an average speed of 49 km/h and covers 2352 km in 41h 10m. The 17020/Hyderabad–Hisar Weekly Express has an average speed of 51 km/h and covers 2352 km in 39h 10m. This Train connects Rajasthan with Shirdi

== Route and halts ==
The important halts of the train are:

- Hisar Junction
- Siwani
- Sadulpur Junction
- Loharu Junction
- Chirawa
- Jhunjhunu
- Nawalgarh
- Sikar Junction
- Ringas Junction
- Jaipur Junction
- Phulera Junction
- Kishangarh
- Ajmer Junction
- Bhilwara
- Chittaurgarh Junction
- Nimach
- Mandsor
- Ratlam Junction
- Ujjain Junction
- Bhopal Junction
- Itarsi Junction
- Khandwa Junction
- Bhusaval Junction
- Manmad Junction
- Chhatrapati Sambhajinagar
- Jalna
- Parbhani Junction
- Hazur Sahib Nanded
- Secunderabad Junction
- Hyderabad Deccan

== Coach composition ==
The train has standard LHB rakes with a max speed of 130 kmph. The train consists of 27 coaches:

- 1 AC I Tier
- 3 AC II Tier
- 6 AC III Tier
- 12 Sleeper coaches
- 2 General Unreserved
- 2 EOG
- 1 High Capacity Parcel Van (HCPV)

== Traction ==
Both trains are hauled by an Electric Loco Shed, Lallaguda or Electric Loco Shed, Vijayawada based WAP-7 electric locomotive from Hisar to Hyderabad and vice versa.

== Rake sharing ==
The train has RSA with 17071/72 Hyderabad Belagavi Express

== Direction reversal ==
The train reverses its direction 2 times:

- Ratlam Junction
- Purna Junction

== See also ==
- Jaipur Junction railway station
- Hyderabad Deccan railway station
- Hyderabad–Raxaul Express
