= Sikar–Delhi Sarai Rohilla Intercity Express =

Sikar – Delhi Sarai Rohilla Intercity Express
Overview
- Service type: Express
- First service: 21 June 2017; 8 years ago
- Current operator: North Western Railway zone

Route
- Termini: Sikar Junction (SIKR); Delhi Sarai Rohilla (DEE)
- Stops: 10
- Distance travelled: 291 km (181 mi)
- Average journey time: 6h 40m
- Service frequency: Bi-weekly (Note: Runs two in a week for every direction.)
- Train number: 14811/14812

On-board services
- Classes: Second Class sitting, AC 3 Tier, Sleeper 3 Tier, Unreserved
- Seating arrangements: Yes
- Sleeping arrangements: Yes
- Catering facilities: E-Catering
- Entertainment facilities: No

Technical
- Rolling stock: 2
- Track gauge: 1,676 mm (5 ft 6 in)
- Operating speed: 41 km/h (25 mph)

Sikar – Delhi Sarai Rohilla Intercity Express is an intercity train of the Indian Railways connecting Sikar Junction in Rajasthan and Sarai Rohilla of Delhi. It is currently being operated with 14811/14812 train numbers on bi-weekly basis.

== Service ==
The 14811/Sikar – Delhi Sarai Rohilla Intercity Express has an average speed of 44 km/h and covers 291 km in 6h 40m. The 14812/Delhi Sarai Rohilla – Sikar Intercity Express has an average speed of 47 km/h and covers 291 km in 6h 15m.

== Route and halts ==
- Sikar Junction
- Nawalgarh
- Dundlod Mukundgarh
- Jhunjhunu
- Surajgarh
- Loharu Junction
- Mahendragarh
- Rewari Junction
- Pataudi Road
- Gurgaon
- Delhi Cantonment
- Delhi Sarai Rohilla

== Coach composite ==
The train consists of 13 coaches :

- 1 AC III Tier
- 4 Sleeper Coaches
- 3 Second Class sitting
- 4 General
- 2 Second-class Luggage/parcel van

== Direction reversal ==
Train Reverses its direction 1 times:

- Loharu Junction

== See also ==
- Sikar railway station
- Delhi Sarai Rohilla railway station
- Delhi Sarai Rohilla–Sikar Express
- Rajasthan Sampark Kranti Express
