= Bikaner–Delhi Cantonment Vande Bharat Express =

Mini Vande Bharat Express train route in India

Bikaner Junction – Delhi Cantonment Vande Bharat Express
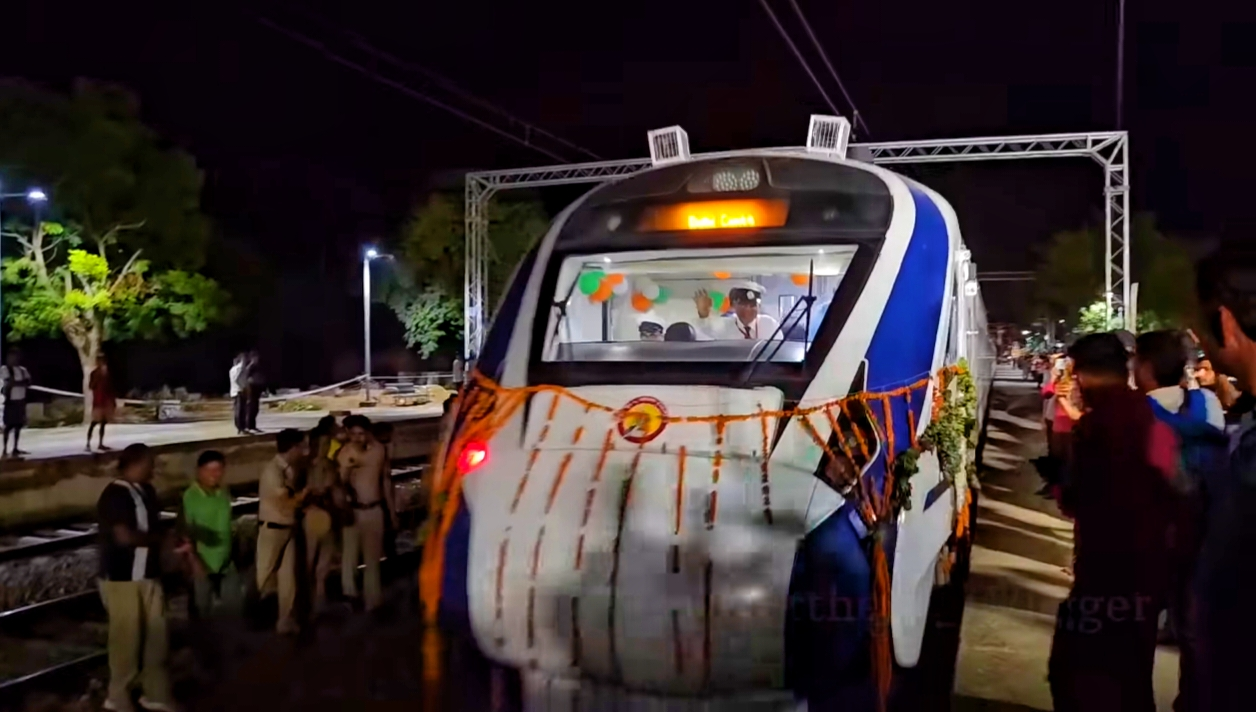
- Bikaner Junction – Delhi Cantonment Vande Bharat Express At Mahendragarh railway station

Overview
- Service type: Vande Bharat Express
- Locale: Rajasthan, Haryana and New Delhi
- First service: 25 September 2025; 12 months ago (Inaugural); 28 September 2025; 12 months ago (Commercial)
- Current operator: North Western Railways (NWR)

Route
- Termini: Bikaner Junction (BKN); Delhi Cantonment (DEC)
- Stops: 07
- Distance travelled: 447 km (278 mi)
- Average journey time: 06 hrs 15 mins
- Service frequency: Six days a week (Note: Except Wednesdays)
- Train number: 26471 / 26472
- Line used: (TBC)

On-board services
- Classes: AC Chair Car, AC Executive Chair Car
- Seating arrangements: Airline style; Rotatable seats
- Sleeping arrangements: No
- Catering facilities: On board Catering
- Observation facilities: Large windows in all coaches
- Entertainment facilities: On-board WiFi; Infotainment system; Electric outlets; Reading light; Seat pockets; Bottle holder; Tray table
- Baggage facilities: Overhead racks
- Other facilities: Kavach

Technical
- Rolling stock: Mini Vande Bharat 2.0
- Track gauge: Indian gauge
- Electrification: 25 kV 50 Hz AC overhead line
- Operating speed: 72 km/h (45 mph) (Avg.)
- Average length: 192 metres (630 ft) (08 coaches)
- Track owner: Indian Railways
- Rake maintenance: Bikaner Jn (BKN)

The 26471/26472 Bikaner–Delhi Cantonment Vande Bharat Express is India's 76th Vande Bharat Express train, connecting the Red City of Rajasthan, Bikaner with the national capital megacity, New Delhi in India.

This express train was inaugurated on 25 September 2025 by the honorable Prime Minister Narendra Modi via video-conferencing from Banswara, a town in the north-western state of Rajasthan.

== Overview ==
This train is currently operated by Indian Railways, connecting Bikaner Junction, Shri Dungargarh, Ratangarh Junction, Churu Junction, Sadulpur Junction, Loharu Junction, Mahendragarh, Gurgaon and Delhi Cantt. It is currently operated with train numbers 26471/26472 on 6 days a week basis.

== Rakes ==
It is the seventy-first 2nd Generation and Mini Vande Bharat 2.0 Express train which was designed and manufactured by the Integral Coach Factory at Perambur, Chennai under the Make in India initiative.

== Service ==
The 26471/26472 Bikaner – Delhi Cantonment Vande Bharat Express currently operates 6 days a week, covering a distance of 447 km (278 mi) in a travel time of 06 hrs 15 mins with average speed of 72 km/h. The Maximum Permissible Speed (MPS) is 110 km/h (68 mph).

Bikaner – Delhi Cantonment Vande Bharat Express (26471)
| Station | Station code | Arrival | Departure | Halt (min) | Distance (km) | Day |
|---|---|---|---|---|---|---|
| Bikaner Jn | BKN | N/A | 05:40 | N/A | 0.0 | 1 |
| Shri Dungargarh | SDGH | 06:29 | 06:31 | 02 | 73.1 | 1 |
| Ratangarh Jn | RTGH | 07:10 | 07:12 | 02 | 137.0 | 1 |
| Churu Jn | CUR | 07:45 | 07:50 | 05 | 179.9 | 1 |
| Sadulpur Jn | SDLP | 08:35 | 08:37 | 02 | 237.7 | 1 |
| Loharu Jn | LHU | 09:15 | 09:17 | 02 | 287.6 | 1 |
| Mahendragarh | MHRG | 09:47 | 09:49 | 02 | 328.5 | 1 |
| Gurgaon | GGN | 11:20 | 11:22 | 02 | 430.1 | 1 |
| Delhi Cantt. | DEC | 11:55 | N/A | N/A | 447.1 | 1 |

Delhi Cantonment – Bikaner Vande Bharat Express (26472)
| Station | Station code | Arrival | Departure | Halt (min) | Distance (km) | Day |
|---|---|---|---|---|---|---|
| Delhi Cantt. | DEC | N/A | 16:45 | N/A | 0.0 | 1 |
| Gurgaon | GGN | 17:02 | 17:04 | 02 | 17.0 | 1 |
| Mahendragarh | MHRG | 18:29 | 18:31 | 02 | 118.7 | 1 |
| Loharu Jn | LHU | 18:59 | 19:01 | 02 | 159.5 | 1 |
| Sadulpur Jn | SDLP | 19:35 | 19:37 | 02 | 209.4 | 1 |
| Churu Jn | CUR | 20:20 | 20:25 | 05 | 267.2 | 1 |
| Ratangarh Jn | RTGH | 20:58 | 21:00 | 02 | 310.1 | 1 |
| Shri Dungargarh | SDGH | 21:41 | 21:43 | 02 | 374.0 | 1 |
| Bikaner Jn | BKN | 23:05 | N/A | N/A | 447.1 | 1 |

== See also ==
- Vande Bharat Express
- Tejas Express
- Gatiman Express
- Bikaner Junction railway station
- Delhi Cantonment railway station
