= Amrapur Aravali Express =

Train in India

Amarapur Aravali Express

Overview
- Service type: Express
- Locale: Rajasthan, Haryana, Gujarat & Maharashtra
- Current operator: North Western Railway

Route
- Termini: Shri Ganganagar (SGNR); Bandra Terminus (BDTS)
- Stops: 54
- Distance travelled: 1,620 km (1,007 mi)
- Average journey time: 31 hours 15 minutes
- Service frequency: Daily
- Train number: 14701 / 14702

On-board services
- Classes: AC 2 Tier, AC 3 Tier, Sleeper Class, General Unreserved
- Seating arrangements: Yes
- Sleeping arrangements: Yes
- Catering facilities: Available
- Observation facilities: Large windows
- Baggage facilities: Available
- Other facilities: Below the seats

Technical
- Rolling stock: LHB coach
- Track gauge: 1,676 mm (5 ft 6 in)
- Operating speed: 52 km/h (32 mph) average including halts.

The 14701 / 14702 Amrapur Aravali Express is a express train belonging to Indian Railways-North Western Railway zone that runs between Shri Ganganagar Junction and Bandra Terminus in India. It operates as train number 14701 from Shri Ganganagar to Bandra Terminus in down direction and as train number 14702 in the up direction. It is named after Amarapur Durbar, a famous temple in Jaipur and the Aravalli Range of mountains that stretches across Gujarat, Rajasthan, Haryana & Delhi.

== Meter Gauge era ==
During Meter Gauge era, Ahmedabad Junction-Old Delhi Mainline was known for its fast Meter Gauge trains. 907-MG/908-MG Aravalli Express that time used to run from Old Delhi to Ahmedabad Junction via Rewari Junction, Loharu Junction, Sikar Junction, Ringas Junction,Jaipur Junction,Ajmer Junction,Marwar Junction,Falna,Abu Road,Palanpur covering 1,032 km (641 mi) in 29 hrs 00 mins running at 36 km/h (22 mph) speed. The train used to reverse its direction 2 times:

1. Loharu Junction
2. Jaipur Junction

== Broad Gauge era ==
In 1997, Ahmedabad Junction-Old Delhi Mainline was converted to Broad Gauge & Ashram Express, Mandore Express & many other Meter Gauge trains were re-introduced in Broad Gauge. 907-MG/908-MG Aravalli Express was reintroduced between Jaipur Junction & Bandra Terminus as 9707/9708 Aravalli Express which in 2010 became 19707/19708 Aravalli Express. The train was covering 1,117 km (694 mi) in 21 hrs 15 mins running at 53 km/h (33 mph) speed. It was literally a crawler & slowest train between Jaipur & Mumbai.

== Extension and renaming ==
Until 7 November 2019, Aravalli Express was running between Jaipur Junction and Bandra Terminus. From 8 November 2019 onwards, the origin of train was shifted from Jaipur Junction to Shri Ganganagar Junction for providing direct rail connectivity to Shri Ganganagar with Jaipur and Mumbai. Name of train also changed name to Amrapur Aravalli Express after extension & number was changed from 19707/19708 to 14701/14702.

== Coaches ==
The 14701/14702 Amarapur Aravali Express presently has 2 AC 2 tier, 3 AC 3 tier, 12 Sleeper class, 4 General Unreserved, 2 Seating cum Luggage Rake coaches & 1 pantry car.

As with most train services in India, coach composition may be amended at the discretion of Indian Railways depending on demand.

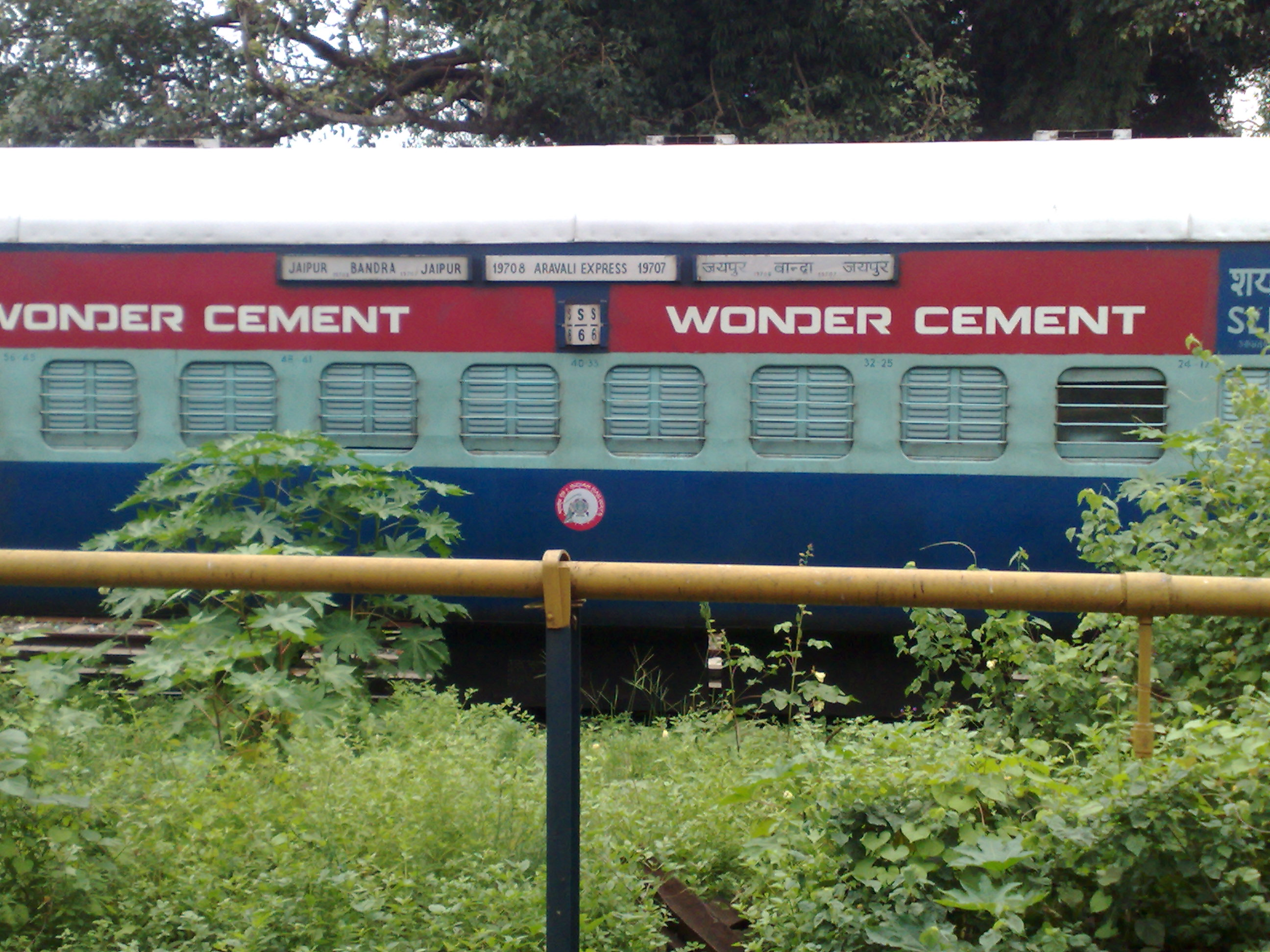
19707 Aravali Express at Bandra Terminus

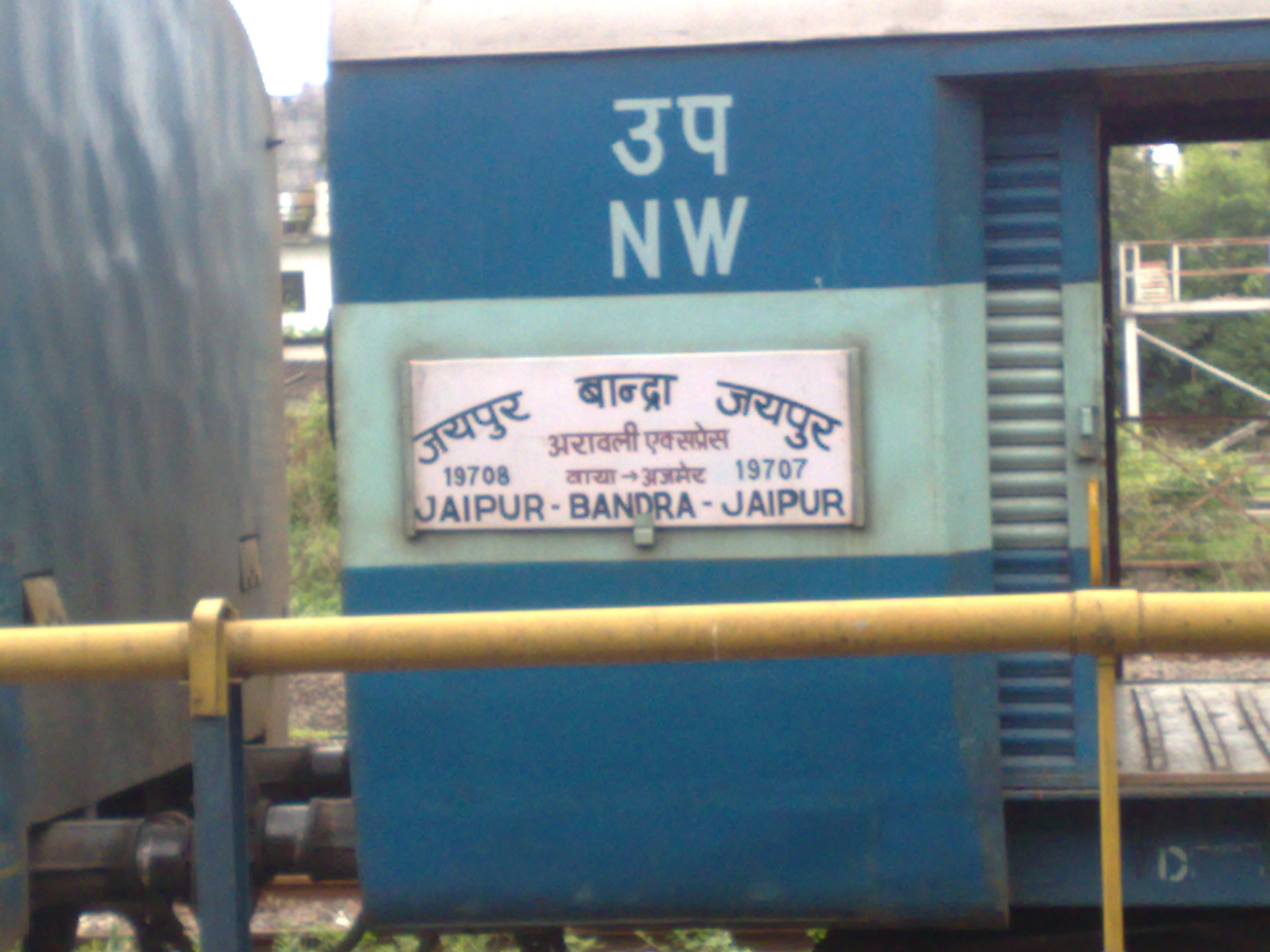
19707 Aravali Express

== Current service ==
The 14701/14702 Amarapur Aravali Express is now covering the distance of 1,620 km (1,007 mi) in 31 hours 15 mins in both directions at 52 km/h (32 mph) speed.

As the average speed of the train is below 55 km/h (34 mph), its fare does not include a Superfast surcharge.

== Important halts ==
The important halts of 14701/14702 Amarapur Aravali Express between Shri Ganganagar Junction and Bandra Terminus are Hanumangarh Junction, Ellenabad, Tahsil Bhadra, Sadulpur Junction, Churu Junction, Palsana, Sikar Junction, Ringas Junction, Jaipur Junction, Phulera Junction, Kishangarh, Ajmer Junction, Beawar, Sojat Road, Marwar Junction, Falna, Abu Road, Palanpur, Mahesana Junction, Sabarmati Junction, Ahmedabad Junction, Nadiad Junction, Anand Junction, Vadodara, Bharuch Junction, Surat, Valsad, Vapi, Vasai Road and Borivali.

== Traction ==
Prior to Western Railway switching to the AC traction, it would be hauled by a WCAM-1 engine until Ahmedabad Junction after which a WDP-4 from the Bhagat Ki Kothi shed until Jaipur Junction.

Since Western Railway switched over to AC traction in February 2012, it is now hauled by a Vadodara Loco Shed or Bhagat Ki Kothi Loco Shed-based WAP-7 electric locomotive on its entire journey.

== Direction reversal ==
The train reverses its direction 3 times:

1. Jaipur Junction
2. Churu Junction
3. Hanumangarh Junction.
