= Kota–Hisar Express =

Train in India

Kota–Sirsa Express
Overview
- Service type: Express
- First service: Inaugural 20 November 2017; 7 years ago; Extended upto Hisar 17 January 2020; 5 years ago
- Current operator(s): West Central Railway

Route
- Termini: Kota Junction (KOTA); Sirsa (SSA)
- Stops: 22
- Distance travelled: 673 km (418 mi)
- Average journey time: 13 hours
- Service frequency: Daily
- Train number(s): 19807 / 19808 (via Loharu); 19813 / 19814 (via Churu)

On-board services
- Class(es): AC 2 Tier, AC 3 Tier, Sleeper Class, General Unreserved
- Seating arrangements: No
- Sleeping arrangements: Yes
- Catering facilities: On-board catering, E-catering
- Observation facilities: Large windows
- Baggage facilities: No
- Other facilities: Below the seats

Technical
- Rolling stock: LHB coach
- Track gauge: 1,676 mm (5 ft 6 in)
- Operating speed: 51 km/h (32 mph) average including halts

The Kota–Sirsa Express is an express train belonging to West Central Railway zone that runs between Kota Junction and Sirsa in India.

== Background ==
This train was running as Kota–Jaipur passenger with number 59801/02 till 20 November 2017 and after it was converted into an express train with numbered 19807/08 for reducing the time of distance between both of cities. But for direct connectivity Hisar it was Extended to Hisar Junction on 17 January 2020 with four days by passing through Churu Junction of 3 days and rest of 4 days passes through Jhunjhunu.

== Service ==
The Kota–Hisar Express has an average speed of 48 km/h and covers 592 km in 12h 23m.

== Routing ==
This train passes through Kota Junction, Sawai Madhopur Junction, Jaipur Junction, Ringas Junction, Sikar Junction, Sadulpur Junction, Loharu Junction, Jhunjhunu, Hisar Junction to reach Sirsa.

== Coach composition ==
The train has standard ICF rakes with a maximum speed of 110 km/h. The train consists of 13 coaches:

- 1 AC II Tier
- 1 AC III Tier
- 5 Sleeper coaches
- 4 General Unreserved
- 2 Seating cum Luggage Rake

== Traction ==
Both trains are hauled by a Tughlakabad Loco Shed-based WAP-7 electric locomotive on its entire journey.

== See also ==
- Kota Junction railway station
- Jaipur Junction railway station
- Hisar Junction railway station
