= Ridi, Rajasthan =

Village in Rajasthan

Ridi रिड़ी
- Village
- Riri
- Location within Rajasthan Location within India
- Coordinates: 27°56′39″N 74°5′53″E
- Country: India
- State: Rajasthan
- District: Bikaner

Government
  - Body: Panchayati Raj

Area
  - Total: 82.53 km^{2} (31.87 sq mi)
- Elevation: 267 m (876 ft)

Population (2011)
  - Total: 10,869
  - Density: 131.7/km^{2} (341.1/sq mi)

Language
  - Official: Hindi; Marwari Bagri; English
- Time zone: UTC+5:30 (IST)
- PIN: 331803
- Telephone code: +91 156 / 0156
- Vehicle registration: RJ-07

Ridi is a village in Dungargarh Tehsil of Bikaner district in state of Rajasthan, India. It is located 91 km away from the Bikaner district and 85 km from Malasar village of Bikaner District.

== History ==
Ridi is known by the name of the land of folk deity "Shree Veer Bigga Ji Maharaj". The people of Ridi are worshipers of Bigga Ji Jakhar.

== Demographics ==
Religion in Ridi Village (2011)
Religion	Percent
Hinduism	98.62%
Islam	1.28%
Other or not stated	0.1%
Distribution of religions in Ridi Village

In Ridi Village, female literacy rate is 32.15% and male literacy rate is 57.07% and according to 2011 census the literacy rate of the entire village is 45.30%. There are 1445 houses in whole village.

The majority of the population of the village follows Hinduism, with followers of Islam a large minority.

Languages of Ridi village(2011)
1. Rajasthani (99.1%)
2. Hindi (0.80%)
3. English (0.10%)

Rajasthani is the major language spoken in Ridi, while Hindi and English are the language of the educated.

== Transport ==
Ridi Village is 21 km. away from Sri Dungargarh Tehsil, and its distance is 20 km. from Shri Dungargarh Railway Station. Bikaner Junction and Shri Dungargarh Railway Station is the largest railway station situated nearby. The Main District Road which connects Kalu to Bidasar also passes through Ridi village.
