= Ladpura =

Village in Rajasthan state, India

- village
- Location in Rajasthan, India Ladpura (India)
- Coordinates: 25°09′04″N 75°07′16″E
- Country: India
- State: Rajasthan

Languages
  - Official: Hindi
- Time zone: UTC+5:30 (IST)
- Postal code: 311604
- ISO 3166 code: RJ-IN

Ladpura is a village in Bhilwara district of Rajasthan state in northwestern India, about 66.2 km east of Bhilwara and 97.2 km west of Kota.

== Geography ==
Ladpura has an average elevation of 382 metres.

== Demographics ==
According to 2001 census total population of village was 2600. Males constitute 52% of the population and females 48%. Ladpura has an average literacy rate of 70%, higher than the national average of 60%: male literacy is 75%, and female literacy is 54%. In Ladpura, 15% of the population is under 6 years of age.

== Transportation ==
Ladpura railway station is the nearest railway station of Ladpura, located on Ahmedabad–Jaipur line operated under Jaipur railway division.
