= JJN =

JJN may refer to:

- JJN, the IATA code for Quanzhou Jinjiang International Airport, Fujian, China
- JJN, the Indian Railways station code for Jhunjhunu railway station, Rajasthan, India
- Jared James Nichols (born 1989), American blues-rock guitarist and singer
