= Ratan Shahar railway station =

Railway station in Rajasthan, India

Ratan Shahar

General information
- Location: Ratan Shahar, Jhunjhunu district, Rajasthan; India
- Coordinates: 28.157975°N 75.523950°E
- System: Indian Railways station
- Owner: Indian Railways
- Operator: North Western Railway
- Line: Sikar–Loharu line
- Platforms: 2
- Tracks: 2

Construction
- Structure type: Standard (on ground station)
- Parking: Yes

Other information
- Status: Single diesel line
- Station code: RSH
- Zone(s): North Western Railway
- Division(s): Jaipur
Location
- Location within India Location within Rajasthan

Ratan Shahar railway station is a railway station in Jhunjhunu district, Rajasthan. Its code is RSH. It serves Ratan Shahar. The station consists of two platforms. Passenger express trains halt here.

== Trains ==
The following trains halt at Ratan Shahar railway station in both directions:

- Delhi Sarai Rohilla–Sikar Express
