= Gegal Akhri railway station =

Railway station in Rajasthan, India

Gegal Akhri

General information
- Location: Gegal, Kishangarh, Ajmer district, Rajasthan; India
- Coordinates: 26°32′25″N 74°46′32″E
- Elevation: 459 metres (1,506 ft)
- System: Indian Railways station
- Owner: Indian Railways
- Operator: North Western Railway
- Line: Ahmedabad–Jaipur line
- Platforms: 2
- Tracks: Double Electric-Line

Construction
- Structure type: Standard (on ground)

Other information
- Status: Functioning
- Station code: GEK
- Zone(s): North Western Railway zone
- Division(s): Jaipur

Services
Preceding station	Indian Railways	Following station
Kishangarh towards ?	North Western Railway zone Ahmedabad–Jaipur line	Ladpura towards ?
Location
- Interactive map

Gegal Akhri railway station is a railway station in located on Ahmedabad–Jaipur railway line operated by the North Western Railway under Jaipur railway division. It is situated at Gegal, Kishangarh in Ajmer district in the Indian state of Rajasthan.
