= Ladpura railway station =

Railway station in Rajasthan, India

Ladpura

General information
- Location: Ladpura, Srinagar Tehshil, Bhilwara district, Rajasthan; India
- Coordinates: 26°30′16″N 74°43′43″E
- Elevation: 467 metres (1,532 ft)
- System: Indian Railways station
- Owner: Indian Railways
- Operator: North Western Railway
- Line: Ahmedabad–Jaipur line
- Platforms: 2
- Tracks: Double Electric-Line

Construction
- Structure type: Standard (on ground)

Other information
- Status: Functioning
- Station code: LR
- Zone(s): North Western Railway zone
- Division(s): Jaipur

Services
Preceding station	Indian Railways	Following station
Gegal Akhri towards ?	North Western Railway zone Ahmedabad–Jaipur line	Madar Junction towards ?
Location
- Interactive map

Ladpura railway station is a railway station in located on Ahmedabad–Jaipur railway line operated by the North Western Railway under Jaipur railway division. It is situated at Ladpura, Srinagar Tehshil in Bhilwara district in the Indian state of Rajasthan.
