= Surajgarh railway station =

Railway station in Rajasthan, India

Surajgarh

General information
- Location: Surajgarh, Jhunjhunu district, Rajasthan; India
- Coordinates: 28.297987°N 75.731035°E
- Elevation: 297 metres (974 ft)
- System: Indian Railways station
- Owner: Indian Railways
- Operator: North Western Railway
- Line: Sikar–Loharu line
- Platforms: 2
- Tracks: 2

Construction
- Structure type: Standard (on ground station)
- Parking: Yes

Other information
- Status: Single Electric line
- Station code: SRGH
- Zone(s): North Western Railway
- Division(s): Jaipur
Location
- Location within India Location within Rajasthan

Surajgarh railway station is a railway station in Jhunjhunu district, Rajasthan. Its code is SRGH. It serves Surajgarh town. The station consists of 2 platforms. Passenger, Express trains halt here.

== Trains ==
The station serves as a halt for several passenger and express trains. As of the latest available information, the following trains stop at Surajgarh railway station:

- Delhi Sarai Rohilla–Sikar Express
- Sikar–Delhi Sarai Rohilla Intercity Express
- Sainik Express
- Rewari–Sikar Passenger
- Sikar–Rewari Passenger

In total, approximately 17 trains pass through Surajgarh station, including 6 Mail/Express trains, 5 other trains, 2 DEMU trains, and 4 passenger trains.

== Facilities ==
Surajgarh railway station offers basic amenities to passengers, including:

- Waiting Rooms: Available for passenger comfort.
- Ticket Counters: For purchasing and reserving tickets.
- Restrooms: Available for passengers.
- Parking Facilities: Available for travelers who prefer to drive to the station.
- Information Kiosks: Providing train and station information.
