= Dundlod Mukundgarh railway station =

Railway station in Rajasthan, India

Dundlod Mukundgarh

General information
- Location: Dundlod, Jhunjhunu district, Rajasthan; India
- Coordinates: 27.938698°N 75.237321°E
- System: Indian Railways station
- Owner: Indian Railways
- Operator: North Western Railway
- Line: Sikar–Loharu line
- Platforms: 2
- Tracks: 2

Construction
- Structure type: Standard (on ground station)
- Parking: Yes

Other information
- Status: Single electric line
- Station code: DOB
- Zone(s): North Western Railway
- Division(s): Jaipur
Location
- Location within India Location within Rajasthan

Dundlod Mukundgarh railway station is a railway station in Jhunjhunu district, Rajasthan. Its code is DOB. It serves Dundlod and Mukundgarh town. The station consists of 2 platforms. Passenger, Express trains halt here.

== Trains ==
The following trains halt at Dundlod Mukundgarh railway station in both directions:

- Delhi Sarai Rohilla–Sikar Express
- Sikar–Delhi Sarai Rohilla Intercity Express
