= Bikaner–Delhi Sarai Rohilla Superfast Express =

Superfast express train in India

Bikaner Delhi Sarai Rohilla Superfast Express
Overview
- Service type: Superfast
- First service: 30 March 2011; 15 years ago
- Current operator: North Western Railways

Route
- Termini: Bikaner Junction (BKN); Delhi Sarai Rohilla(DEE)
- Stops: 13
- Distance travelled: 458 km (285 mi)
- Average journey time: 8 hours (Approx.)
- Service frequency: Daily
- Train number: 12456 / 12455

On-board services
- Classes: AC 1st Class; AC 2 tier; AC 3 tier; Sleeper Class; General
- Seating arrangements: Yes
- Sleeping arrangements: Yes
- Catering facilities: Available but No Pantry Car
- Observation facilities: RSA with 22421 / 22422 Salasar Express

Technical
- Rolling stock: LHB coach
- Track gauge: 1,676 mm (5 ft 6 in) broad gauge
- Operating speed: 57.92 km/h (36 mph)

The 12456/12455 Bikaner–Delhi Sarai Rohilla Superfast Express is a Superfast Express train belonging to Indian Railways – North Western Railway zone that runs between Bikaner Junction and Delhi Sarai Rohilla in India.

It operates as train number 12458 from Bikaner Junction to Delhi Sarai Rohilla and as train number 12457 in the reverse direction serving the states of Rajasthan, Haryana and Delhi.

== Coaches ==
The 12456/12455 Bikaner–Delhi Sarai Rohilla Superfast Express typically operates with one AC First Class cum AC 2-Tier coach, one AC 2-Tier coach, six AC 3-Tier coaches, seven Sleeper Class coaches, six General Unreserved coaches, and one Seating cum Luggage Rake (SLR) coaches. The train does not include a pantry car.

As with most Indian Railways services, the coach composition is subject to change based on operational requirements and passenger demand.

== Service ==
The 12458 Bikaner–Delhi Sarai Rohilla Superfast Express covers the distance of 458 km (285 mi) in 7 hours 40 mins averaging 59.74 km/h (37 mph) & in 8 hours 10 mins as 12457 Delhi Sarai Rohilla–Bikaner Superfast Express averaging 56.08 km/h (35 mph).

As the average speed of the train is above 55 km/h (34 mph), as per Indian Railway rules, its fare includes a Superfast surcharge.

== Routeing ==
The 12456/55 Bikaner–Delhi Sarai Rohilla Superfast Express runs from Bikaner Junction via Suratgarh, Sriganganagar, Bathinda, Dhuri, Jakhal Junction, Rohtak junction to Delhi Sarai Rohilla.

This train is different from the 12455/56 Delhi Sarai Rohilla–Bikaner Superfast Express which is operated by Northern Railways and runs via Sri Ganganagar Junction railway station utilising LHB coach.

== Traction ==
As the entire route is fully electrified, a Tughalakabad -based WAP-4 or WAG-9 locomotive powers the train for its entire journey.

== See also ==
- Delhi Sarai Rohilla railway station
- Bikaner Junction railway station
- Delhi Sarai Rohilla–Bikaner Superfast Express
- Bikaner–Delhi Sarai Rohilla Intercity Express
- Salasar Express
