= Jodhpur–Delhi Cantonment Vande Bharat Express =

Mini Vande Bharat Express train route in India

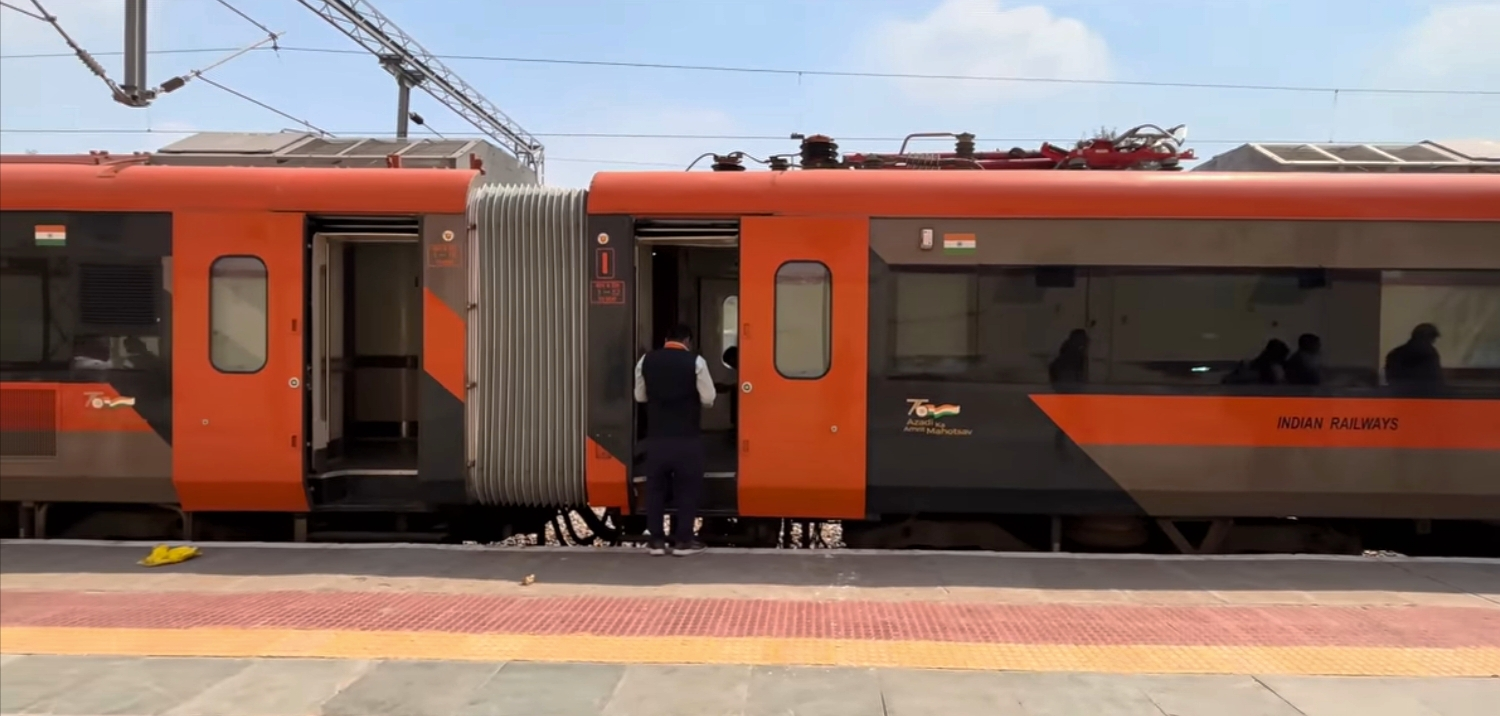
- Jodhpur–Delhi Cantonment Vande Bharat Express at Rewari Junction railway station

Overview
- Service type: Vande Bharat Express
- Locale: Rajasthan, Haryana and New Delhi
- First service: 25 September 2025; 13 months ago (Inaugural); 27 September 2025; 13 months ago (Commercial)
- Current operator: North Western Railways (NWR)

Route
- Termini: Jodhpur (JU); Delhi Cantonment (DEC)
- Stops: 08
- Distance travelled: 604 km (375 mi)
- Average journey time: 08 hrs 05 mins
- Service frequency: Six days a week (Note: Except Tuesdays)
- Train number: 26481 / 26482
- Line used: (TBC)

On-board services
- Classes: AC Chair Car, AC Executive Chair Car
- Seating arrangements: Airline style; Rotatable seats
- Sleeping arrangements: No
- Catering facilities: On-board catering
- Observation facilities: Large windows in all coaches
- Entertainment facilities: On-board WiFi; Infotainment system; Electric outlets; Reading light; Seat pockets; Bottle holder; Tray table
- Baggage facilities: Overhead racks
- Other facilities: Kavach

Technical
- Rolling stock: Mini Vande Bharat 2.0 (Last service: May 22 2026); Vande Bharat 3.0 (First service: May 23 2026)
- Track gauge: Indian gauge
- Electrification: 25 kV 50 Hz AC overhead line
- Operating speed: 75 km/h (47 mph) (Avg.)
- Average length: 480 metres (1,570 ft) (20 coaches)
- Track owner: Indian Railways
- Rake maintenance: Jodhpur (JU)

The 26481/26482 Jodhpur–Delhi Cantonment Vande Bharat Express is India's 75th Vande Bharat Express train, which connects Jodhpur, Rajasthan with the national capital New Delhi in India.

This express train was inaugurated on 25 September 2025 by the Prime Minister Narendra Modi via video-conferencing from Banswara, a town in the north-western state of Rajasthan.

== Overview ==
This train is currently operated by Indian Railways, connecting Jodhpur, Merta Road Junction, Degana Junction, Makrana Junction, Phulera Junction, Jaipur Junction, Gandhinagar Jaipur, Alwar Junction, Rewari Junction, Gurgaon and Delhi Cantt. It is currently operated with train numbers 26481/26482 on 6 days a week basis.

== Rakes ==
It was the seventieth 2nd Generation and Mini Vande Bharat 2.0 Express train which was designed and manufactured by the Integral Coach Factory at Perambur, Chennai under the Make in India initiative.

=== Coach augmentation ===
With the huge passenger demand, the current running rake has been converted to 20-car, previously ran with 08-car rake as this would benefit passengers who wish to travel to the Capital City - New Delhi by touching the Pink Capital City of India, Jaipur.

== Service ==
The 26481/26482 Jodhpur–Delhi Cantonment Vande Bharat Express currently operates 6 days a week, covering a distance of 605 km (376 mi) in a travel time of 08 hrs 05 mins with average speed of 75 km/h. The Maximum Permissible Speed (MPS) is 130 km/h (81 mph).

Jodhpur–Delhi Cantonment Vande Bharat Express (26481)
Station	Station code	Arrival	Departure	Halt (min)	Distance (km)	Day
Jodhpur	JU	N/A	05:30	N/A	0.0	1
Merta Road Jn	MTD	06:36	06:38	02	105.0	1
Degana Jn	DNA	07:06	07:08	02	149.0	1
Makrana Jn	MKN	07:37	07:39	02	193.0	1
Phulera Jn	FL	08:35	08:37	02	258.0	1
Jaipur Jn	JP	09:20	09:25	05	313.0	1
Gandhinagar Jaipur	GADJ	09:34	09:36	02	318.0	1
Alwar Jn	AWR	11:13	11:15	02	464.0	1
Rewari Jn	RE	12:13	12:15	02	538.0	1
Gurgaon	GGN	12:55	12:57	02	589.0	1
Delhi Cantt.	DEC	13:30	N/A	N/A	605.0	1

Delhi Cantonment–Jodhpur Vande Bharat Express (26482)
Station	Station code	Arrival	Departure	Halt (min)	Distance (km)	Day
Delhi Cantt.	DEC	N/A	15:10	N/A	0.0	1
Gurgaon	GGN	15:24	15:26	02	17.0	1
Rewari Jn	RE	16:20	16:22	02	69.0	1
Alwar Jn	AWR	17:08	17:10	02	143.0	1
Gandhinagar Jaipur	GADJ	18:37	18:39	02	288.0	1
Jaipur Jn	JP	19:00	19:05	05	294.0	1
Phulera Jn	FL	19:58	20:00	02	348.0	1
Makrana Jn	MKN	20:43	20:45	02	413.0	1
Degana Jn	DNA	21:13	21:15	02	457.0	1
Merta Road Jn	MTD	21:42	21:44	02	501.0	1
Jodhpur	JU	23:20	N/A	N/A	605.0	1

== See also ==
- Vande Bharat Express
- Tejas Express
- Gatiman Express
- Jodhpur railway station
- Delhi Cantonment railway station
