= Jhunjhunu railway station =

Railway station in Rajasthan, India

Jhunjhunu

General information
- Location: Jhunjhunu, Jhunjhunu district, Rajasthan; India
- Coordinates: 28.106865°N 75.390013°E
- System: Indian Railways station
- Owner: Indian Railways
- Operator: North Western Railway
- Line: Sikar–Loharu line
- Platforms: 3
- Tracks: 4

Construction
- Structure type: Standard (on ground station)
- Parking: Yes

Other information
- Status: Single electric line
- Station code: JJN
- Zone(s): North Western Railway
- Division(s): Jaipur
- Fare zone: Northwestern Railway
Location
- Location within India Location within Rajasthan

== About ==
Jhunjhunu railway station (station code: JJN) is an Indian Railways-operated station in the Jhunjhunu district of Rajasthan, for passenger trains on the Sikar-Loharu Line. Consisting of three platforms, both express routes and one premium train (Duronto) arrive and depart from here.

In 2019–20, the station underwent redevelopment at the cost of Rs. 41 lakhs, with the inclusion of various passenger-friendly facilities and infrastructural upgrades. It is a part of the North Western Railway (NWR) zone of the Indian Railways.

1. Station code: JJN
2. Number of Platforms: 3
3. Number of Halting Trains: 24
4. Number of Originating Trains: 0
5. Number of Terminating Trains: 0

== Trains ==
The following trains stop at Jhunjhunu railway station in both directions:

Premium Train

- Mumbai Central–Hisar Duronto Express

Other Express Trains

1. Sainik Express
2. Sikar–Delhi Sarai Rohilla Intercity Express
3. Kota–Sirsa Express
4. Hyderabad–Hisar Weekly Express
5. Prayagraj–Bikaner SF
6. Tirupati SF
7. Jaipur–Ganganagar Express

== Train Timetable ==
S.No	Train No.	Name	Type	Frequency	To	Departure Time
1	19701	Sainik Express	Exp	Daily	Delhi Cantt	00:11 Hrs
2	09604	~~Shrimata Vaishnodevi - Udaipur City~~	Special	Fri	Udaipur City	02:30 Hrs
3	19702	Sainik Express	Exp	Daily	Jaipur JN	04:56 Hrs
4	04854	Loharu - Sikar Demu Special	DEMU	Daily	Sikar JN	05:21 Hrs
5	19807	Kota–Sirsa Express (Via Loharu)	Exp	Mon, Wed, Thu, Sat	Sirsa	08:00 Hrs
6	04705	Shri Ganganagar - Jaipur Special Fare Special	Exp	Daily	Jaipur JN	08:36 Hrs
7	54803	Sikar - Rewari Passenger	Pass	Daily	Rewari JN	08:36 Hrs
8	17020	Hyderabad–Hisar Weekly Express	Exp	Mon	Hisar JN	09:20 Hrs
9	17019	Hisar-Hyderabad Weekly Express	Exp	Tues	Hydrabad	11:40 Hrs
10	20404	Lalgarh - Prayagraj SF Express (Via Loharu)	SF	Mon, Thu, Sat	Prayagraj	11:40 Hrs
11	14714	Delhi Sarai Rohilla-Sikar Intercity Express	Exp	Wed, Fri	Sikar	11:40 Hrs
12	09603	~~Udaipur city - Shrimata VaishnoDevi~~	Special	Wed	Shrimata VaishnoDevi	12:22 Hrs
13	54703	Bathinda - Jaipur Passenger	Pass	Daily	Jaipur JN	12:49 Hrs
14	12240	Hisar-Mumbai Central Duronto Express	Duronto Exp	Tues, Thu	Mumbai Central	13:53 Hrs
15	54704	Jaipur - Bathinda Passenger	Pass	Daily	Bathinda JN	14:18 Hrs
16	20403	Prayagraj - Lalgarh SF Express (Via Loharu)	SF	Mon, Thu, Sat	Lalgarh JN	15:40 Hrs
17	14713	Sikar–Delhi Sarai Rohilla Intercity Express	Exp	Wed, Fri	Delhi Sarai Rohilla	15:40 Hrs
18	04706	Jaipur - Shri Ganganagar Special Fare Special	Exp	Daily	Shri Ganganagar JN	16:20 Hrs
19	12239	Mumbai Central–Hisar Duronto Express	Duronto Exp	Mon, Wed	Hisar JN	16:38 Hrs
20	04717	Hisar - Tirupati SF Special Fare Special	SF	Sat	Tirupati	17:43 Hrs
21	04718	Tirupati - Hisar SF Special Fare Special	SF	Thu	Hisar JN	18:14 Hrs
22	54804	Rewari - Sikar Passenger	Pass	Daily	Sikar JN	19:21 Hrs
23	19808	Sirsa-Kota Express (Via Loharu)	Exp	Mon, Wed, Thu, Sat	Kota JN	21:17 Hrs
24	04853	Sikar - Loharu Demu Special	DEMU	Daily	Loharu JN	22:08 Hrs
