= Palsana, Rajasthan =

Palsana
- City
- Nickname: Palsana
- Location in Rajasthan, India Palsana (India)
- Coordinates: 27.5121433°N 75.3260324°E
- Country: India
- State: Rajasthan
- District: Sikar
- Founder: Palsania
- Named for: Palsania

Government
  - Type: Nagar Palika
  - Rank: Largest village in Sikar district

Population (2021)
  - Total: 13,186
  - Rank: First

Languages
  - Official: Hindi
  - Regional: Rajasthani
  - Other: Rajasthani, Hindi

Hindu
- Time zone: UTC+5:30 (IST`)
- PIN: 332402
- +91: 91-1576
- Vehicle registration: RJ-23
- NH52: (land)
- Climate: Köppen climate classification (Köppen)

Palsana is a City located in the Sikar District region of Rajasthan state in India. It is 84 km away from Jaipur, 350 km from Jodhpur 245 km from Bikaner and 250 km from Delhi30 km from Sikar.

== Geography and climate ==
=== Geography ===
Palsana is the Panchayat Samiti of Dantaramgarh Tahsil of Sikar district which is situated in the eastern part of Rajasthan. Its co-ordinates are 27.5121433°N 75.3260324°E. It has an average elevation of 427 metres (1401 feet) above mean sea level.

=== Climate ===
Palsana has a hot semi-arid climate (Köppen climate classification BSh) climate, rains occur in the monsoon months between June and September. Temperatures remain relatively high throughout the year, with the summer months of April to July having average daily temperatures of around 30 °C (86 °F). The maximum temperatures during the months of May and June can reach close to 50 °C (122 °F) with little to no humidity. During the monsoon there are frequent, heavy rains and thunderstorms, but flooding is not common. The winter months of November to February are mild and pleasant, with average temperatures ranging from 15–18 °C (59–64 °F) and with little or no humidity. There are however occasional cold fronts that lead to temperatures near freezing.

Palsana

Climate chart (precipitation, max. and min. temperature)
J	F	M	A	M	J	J	A	S	O	N	D
0 23 6	1 26 9	1 32 15	0 38 22	2 42 27	3 42 29	6 38 28	5 37 27	3 37 25	0 36 19	0 31 12	0 25 7
- █ Average max. and min. temperatures in °C
- █ Precipitation totals in mm
- Source: YR
Imperial conversion
J	F	M	A	M	J	J	A	S	O	N	D
0 73 42	0 78 48	0 89 59	0 101 72	0.1 107 80	0.1 107 84	0.2 100 82	0.2 98 80	0.1 98 76	0 97 66	0 87 54	0 78 44
- █ Average max. and min. temperatures in °F
- █ Precipitation totals in inches

== Place of interest ==
- Sri Digamber Jain Bada Mandir, Bawari Gate
- Khandela Vaishya Dham
- Madho Niwas Kothi
- Diwan Ji ki Haveli
- Shobhagyavati mandir
- Saras Dairy
- Desi Tatt Bhojnalay
- Suraj Smart School

=== Temples ===
- Jeen Mata Temple
- Khatu Shayam Temple
- Mata Mansa Devi Temple, Ladhana
- Gopal Ji Ka Bada Mandir
- Shakambhari Mata Hills and Temple

== Education ==
- Suraj Smart School (Best in the area)
- Ideal Education Sanasthan (near Shani Mandir)
- Jaya Publice Senior school

== Administration ==
Palsana city is governed by Municipal Corporation which comes under Sikar Urban Agglomeration.

== Transport ==
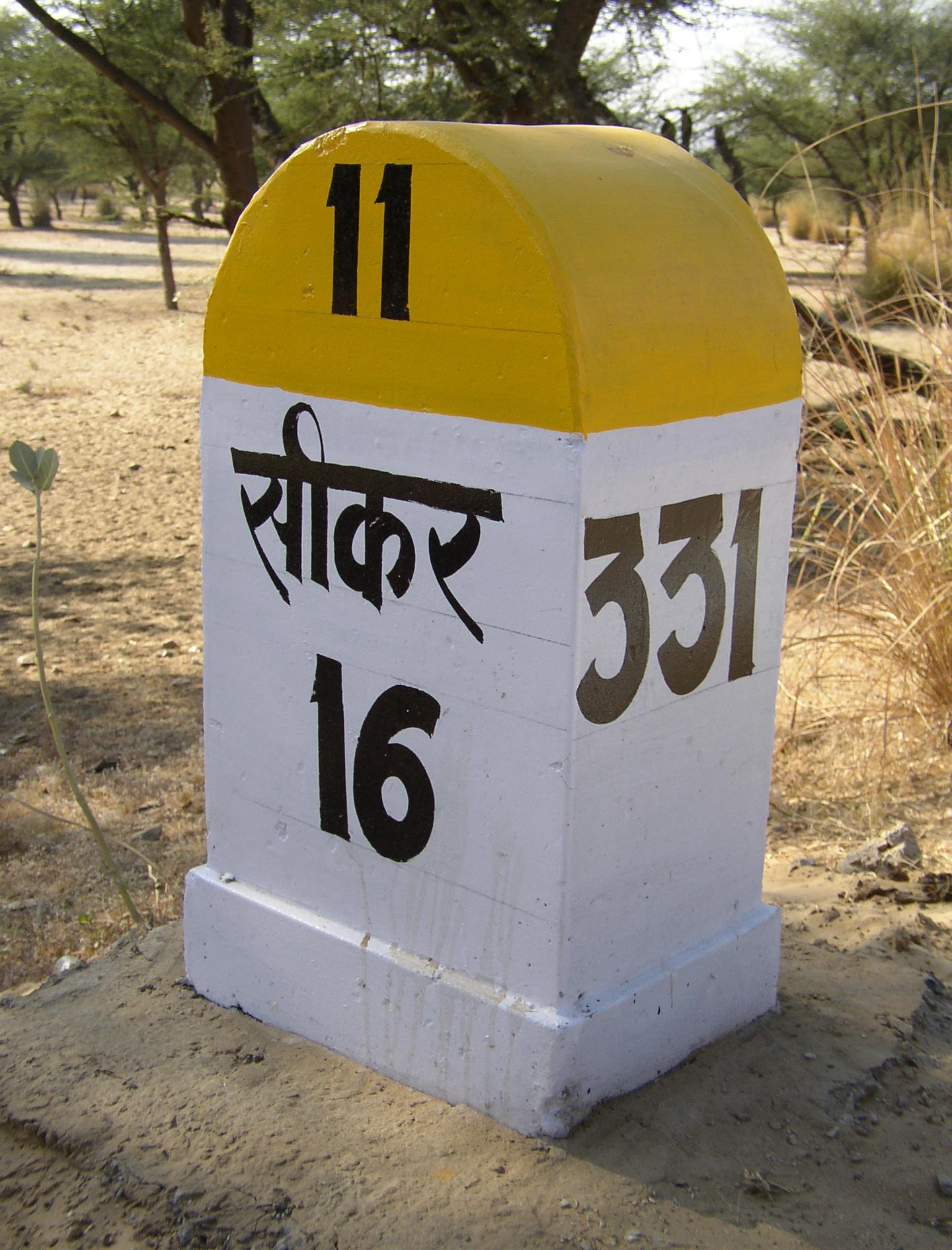
Kilometre sign „Sikar 16 km“

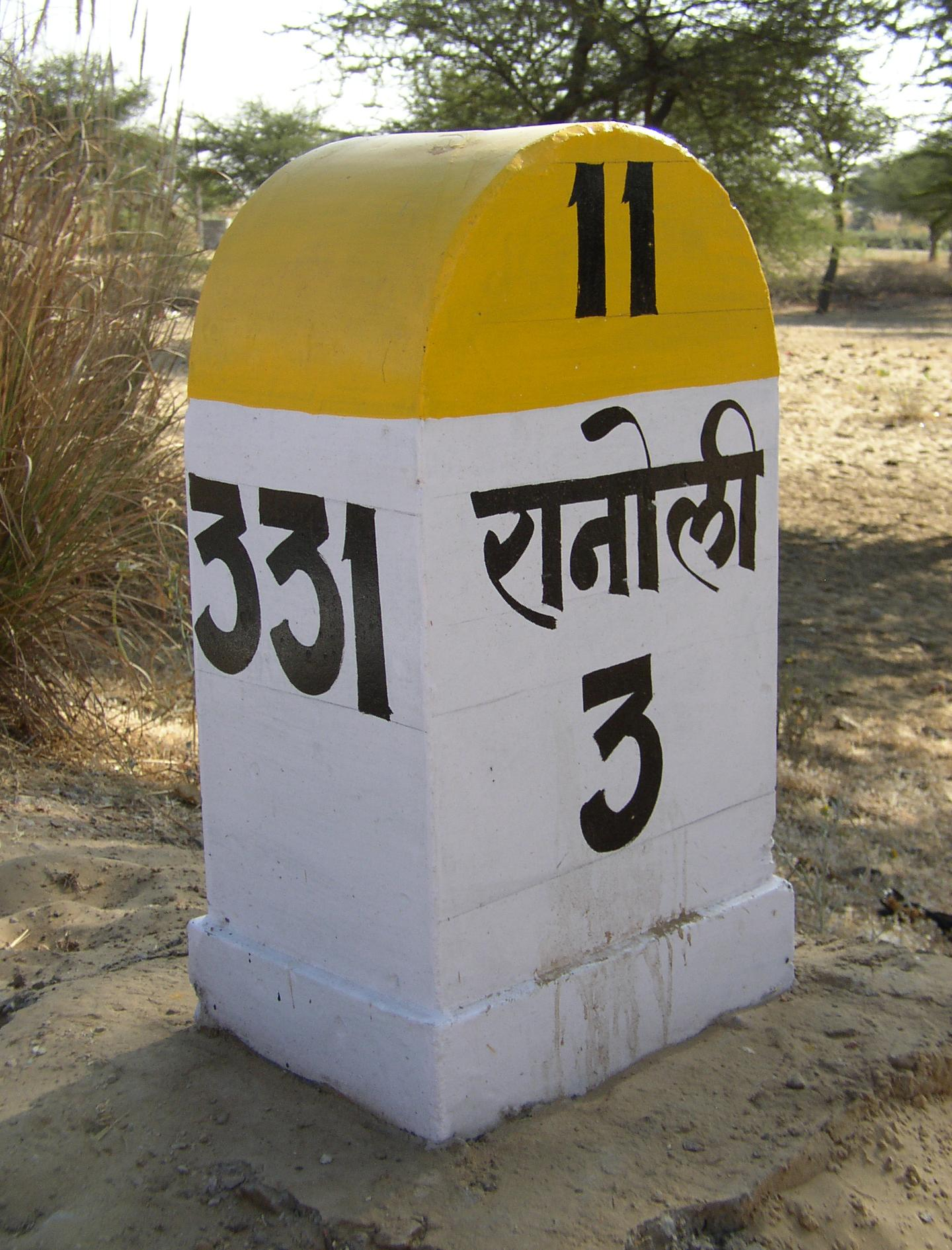
Kilometre sign „Ranoli 3 km"

=== Rail ===
Palsana comes under the territory of Northern Western Railway, and is served by Palsana railway station. As of now Palsana city is well connected through broad gauge railway line section to, Jaipur, Loharu, Rewari, Churu, Jhunjhunu.

=== Road ===
Palsana is well connected by roads from all the major cities of Rajasthan. One national highway NH-52 passes through center of city. NH-52 connects Sikar to Jaipur, Kaithal and Bikaner. The western freight corridor will also connect with Sikar. Kotputali Kuchaman Megahighway also passes through Palsana.

=== Air ===
The nearest airport to Palsana town is Jaipur International Airport, which operate daily flights to Delhi, Mumbai, Hyderabad, Bangalore, Pune, Indore, Ahmedabad, Chennai, Guwahati, Kolkata, Udaipur, Dubai, Sharjah, Muscat. A new airport is proposed at Shahpura (a town in Jaipur district) that is very near to Sikar. Beside that, a small Air strip at Tarpura village is also available for Small Private Planes Landing (against payment).

== See also ==
- Sikar district
- Sikar (Lok Sabha constituency)
- Sikar (Rajasthan Assembly constituency)
