= Mumbai Central–Indore Duronto Express =

Train in India

Mumbai Central – Indore Jn Duronto Express

Overview
- Service type: Duronto Express
- Locale: Maharashtra, Gujarat & Madhya Pradesh
- First service: 26 January 2011; 15 years ago
- Current operator: Western Railways

Route
- Termini: Mumbai Central (MMCT); Indore Junction (INDB)
- Stops: 5
- Distance travelled: 829 km (515 mi)
- Average journey time: 11 hours 15 minutes
- Service frequency: Bi-weekly
- Train number: 12227 / 12228

On-board services
- Classes: AC 1st Class; AC 2 tier AC 3 tier AC Economy
- Seating arrangements: Yes
- Sleeping arrangements: Yes
- Catering facilities: Yes, pantry car attached
- Observation facilities: Rake sharing with 12239/12240; Mumbai Central–Hisar Duronto Express and 22209/22210; Mumbai Central–Hazrat Nizamuddin Duronto Express
- Baggage facilities: Yes

Technical
- Rolling stock: LHB coach
- Track gauge: 1,676 mm (5 ft 6 in)
- Operating speed: 130 km/h (81 mph) maximum permissible speed 73 km/h (45 mph) average including halts
Route map
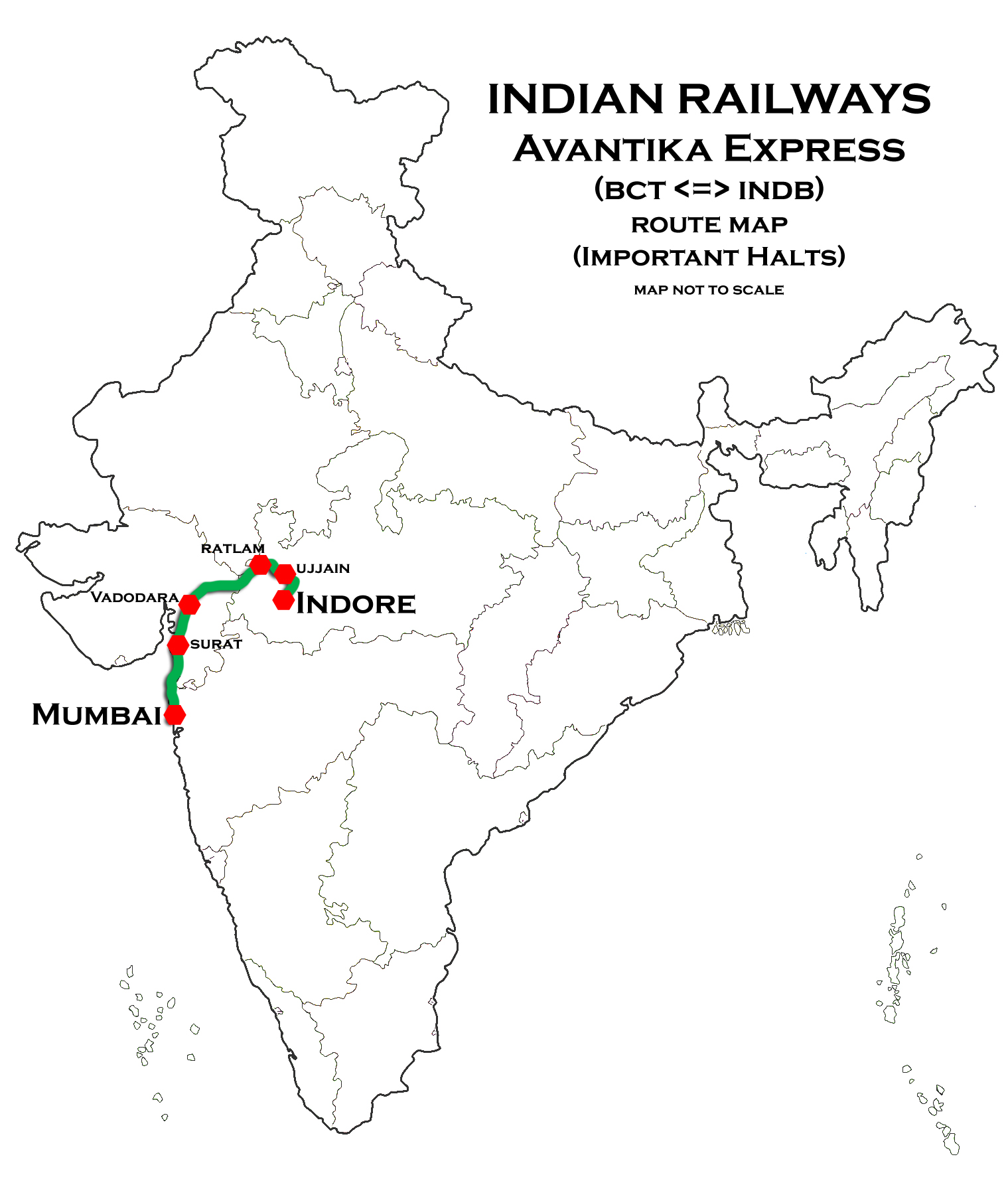

The 12227 / 12228 Mumbai Central–Indore Duronto Express is a Superfast Express train which belongs to Western Railway zone that runs between Mumbai Central of Maharashtra to Indore Junction of Madhya Pradesh in India.

== Coach composition ==
| Loco | 1 | 2 | 3 | 4 | 5 | 6 | 7 | 8 | 9 | 10 | 11 | 12 | 13 | 14 | 15 | 16 | 17 |
|---|---|---|---|---|---|---|---|---|---|---|---|---|---|---|---|---|---|
| WAP7 | EOG | M1 | M2 | M3 | M4 | B1 | B2 | B3 | B4 | B5 | B6 | A1 | A2 | A3 | PC | H1 | DL1 |

*Note – The coach composition shown here is for 12227 (Mumbai to Indore), For 12228 (Indore to Mumbai) the composition will be flipped.

== Service ==
It is the fastest train on the Mumbai–Indore sector. It averages 73 km/h as 12227 Duronto Express covering 829 km in 11 hrs 10 mins and 72 km/h as 12228 Duronto Express covering 829 km in 11 hrs 20 mins. The other train that connects Mumbai & Indore is the 12961/62 Avantika Express with an average speed of 68 km/h as 12961 and 64 km/h as 12962.

== Train details ==
This train had its inaugural run on 26 January 2011. It was & still is a 2 days a week service. It is a fully AC train & uses LHB rakes.

12227/12228 Mumbai Central Indore Duronto Express has RSA with =

12239/12240 Mumbai Central Hisar Duronto Express.

22209/22210 Mumbai Central Hazrat Nizamuddin Duronto Express.

All these 3 Duronto have no halt at Surat station.

== Traction ==
When this train was introduced it was hauled by an Electric Loco Shed, Vadodara or Electric Loco Shed, Valsad-based WAP-4. Later on WAP-5 hauled it regularly. Now Vadodara-based WAP-7 locomotive hauls the train between Mumbai Central & Indore Jn. Most of the times the train has been seen with HOG-enabled WAP-7 loco. However occasionally the Vadodara-based WAP-5 loco also hauls the train.

== Routes and halts ==
The Important Halts of the train are :

● Mumbai Central

● Vadodara Junction

● Ratlam Junction

● Ujjain Junction

● Indore Junction

== Schedule ==
| Train number | Station code | Departure station | Departure time | Departure day | Arrival station | Arrival time | Arrival day |
|---|---|---|---|---|---|---|---|
| 12227 | MMCT | Mumbai Central | 11:10 PM | Thursday/Saturday | Indore Junction | 10:20 AM | Friday/Sunday |
| 12228 | INDB | Indore Junction | 9:00 PM | Friday/Sunday | Mumbai Central | 8:20 AM | Saturday/Monday |

== Rake share ==
The train will rake sharing with Mumbai Central–Hisar Duronto Express (12239/12240).

22209/10 Mumbai Central Hazrat Nizamuddin Duronto Express.

== Gallery ==
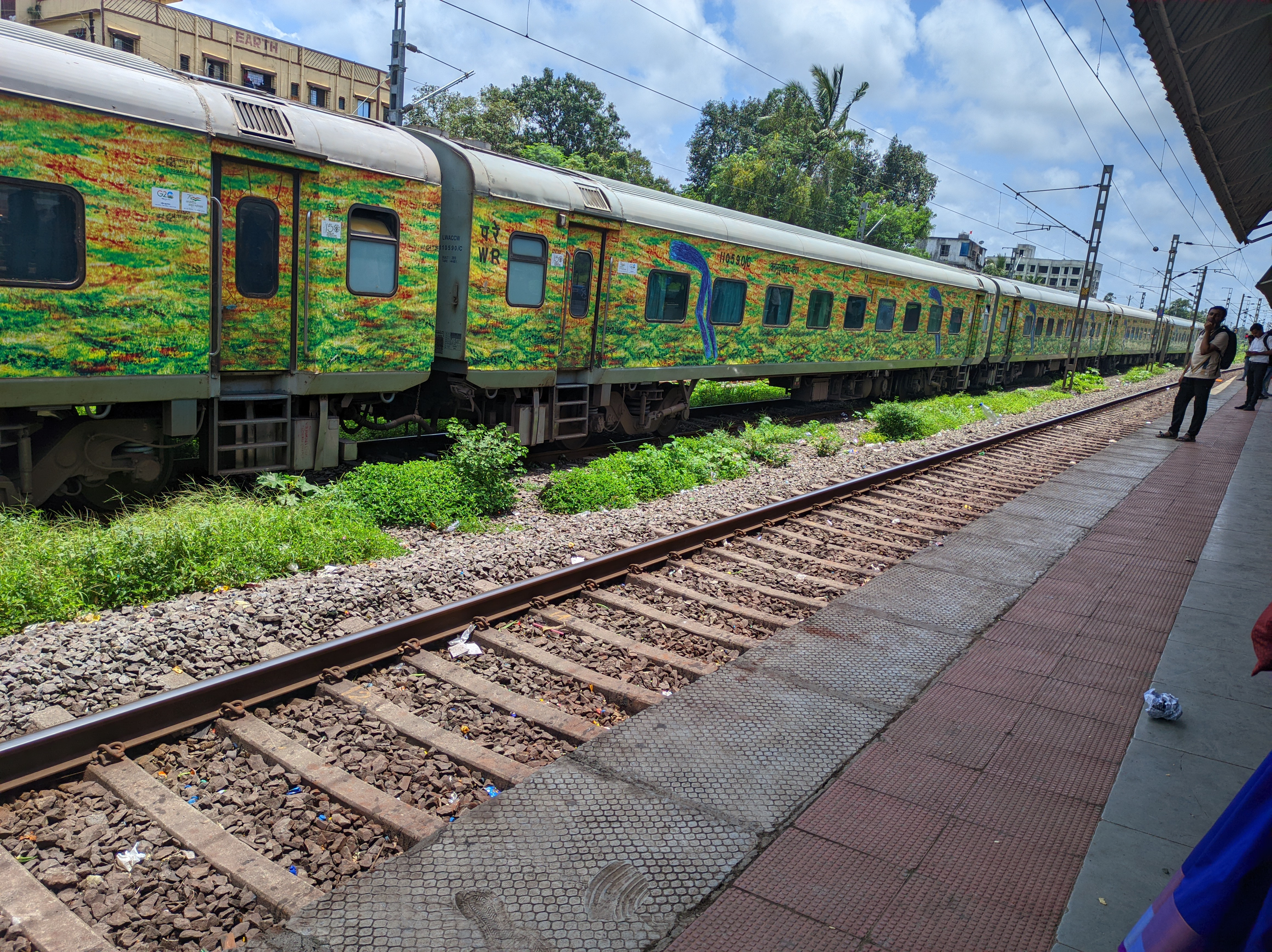
Rake of Indore/Hisar/Delhi - Mumbai Duronto Express, stabled at Boisar

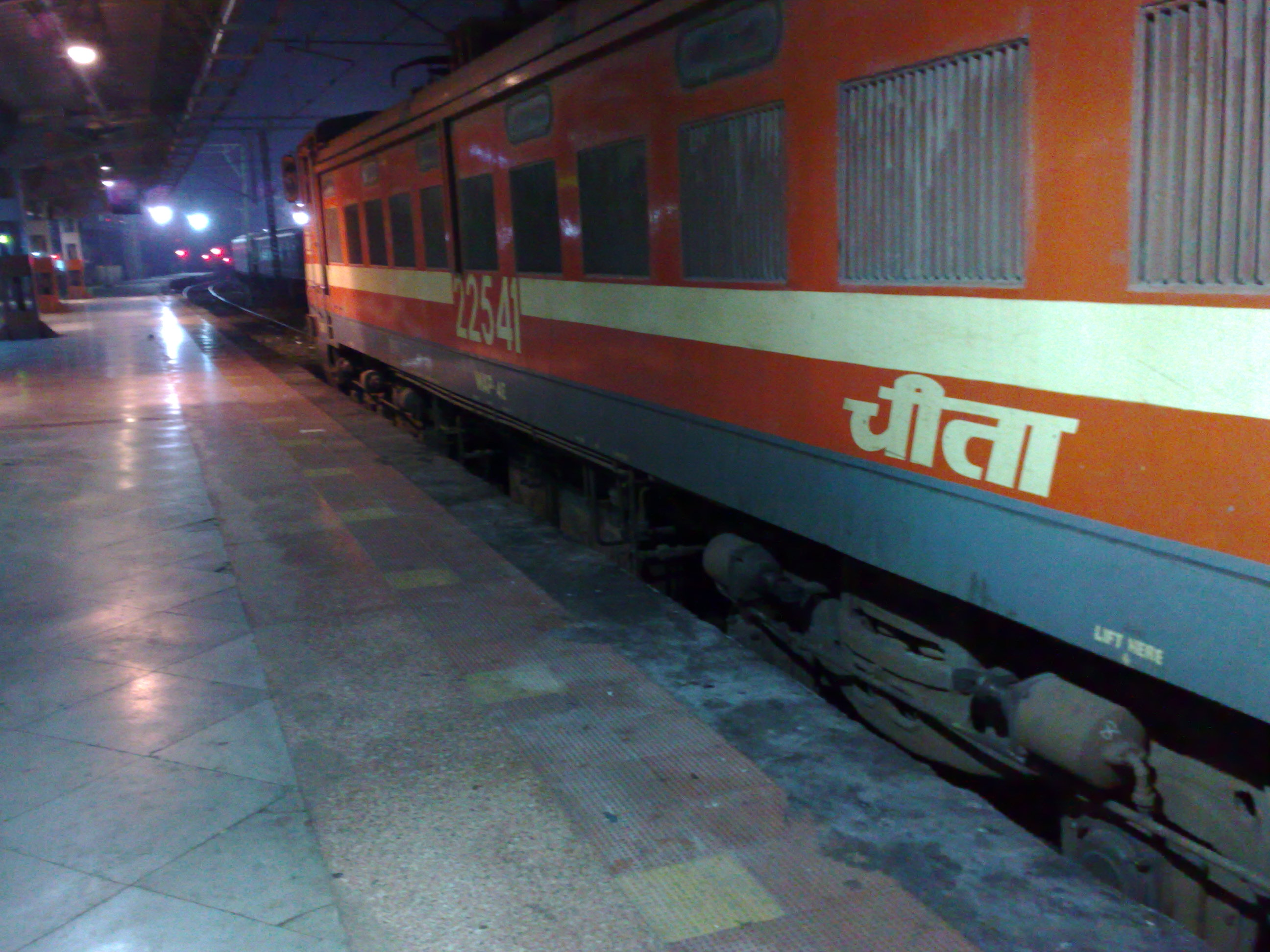
WAP-4 engine of the 12227 Indore Duronto Express

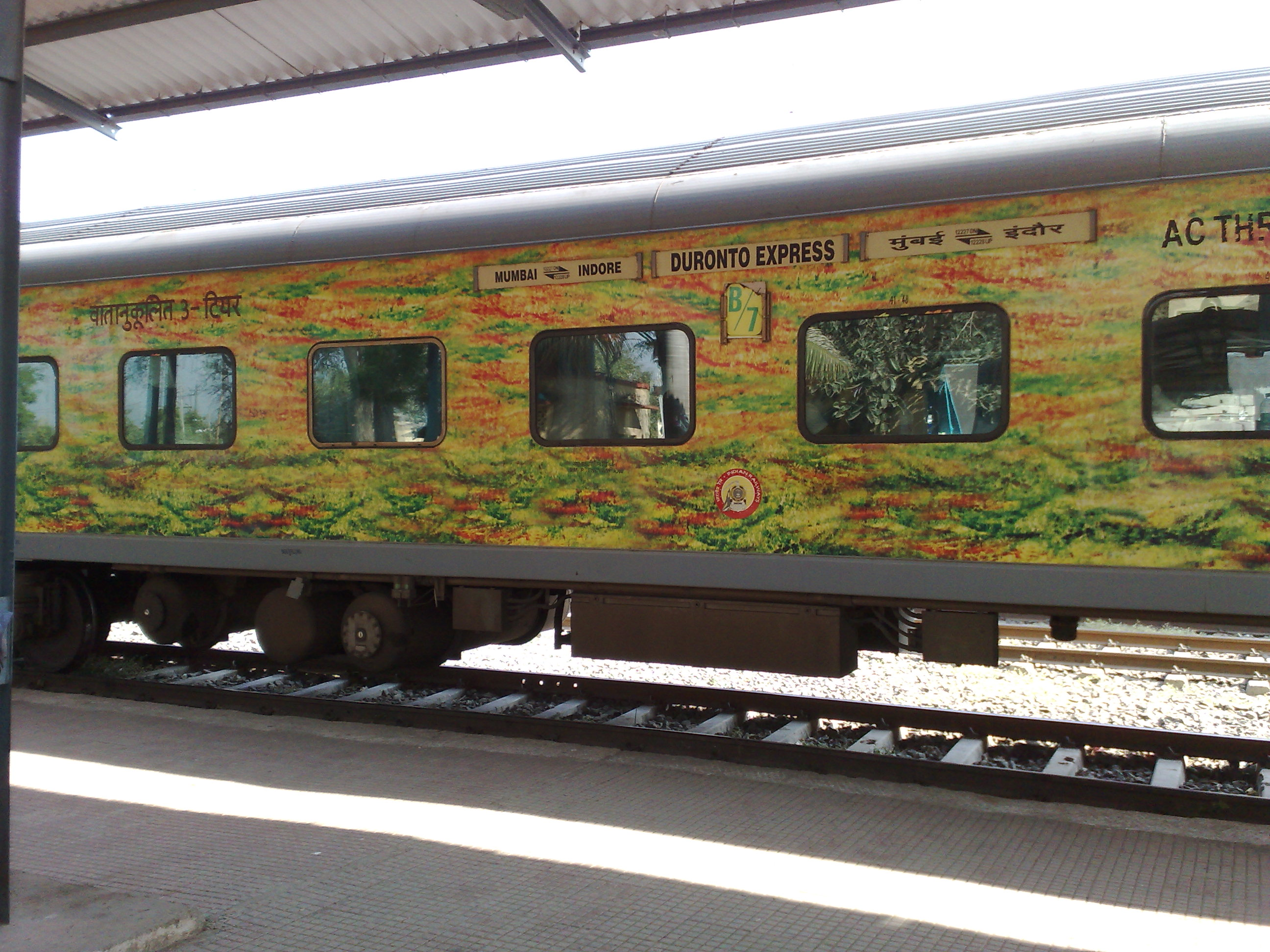
12227 Indore Duronto Express – AC 3 tier coach

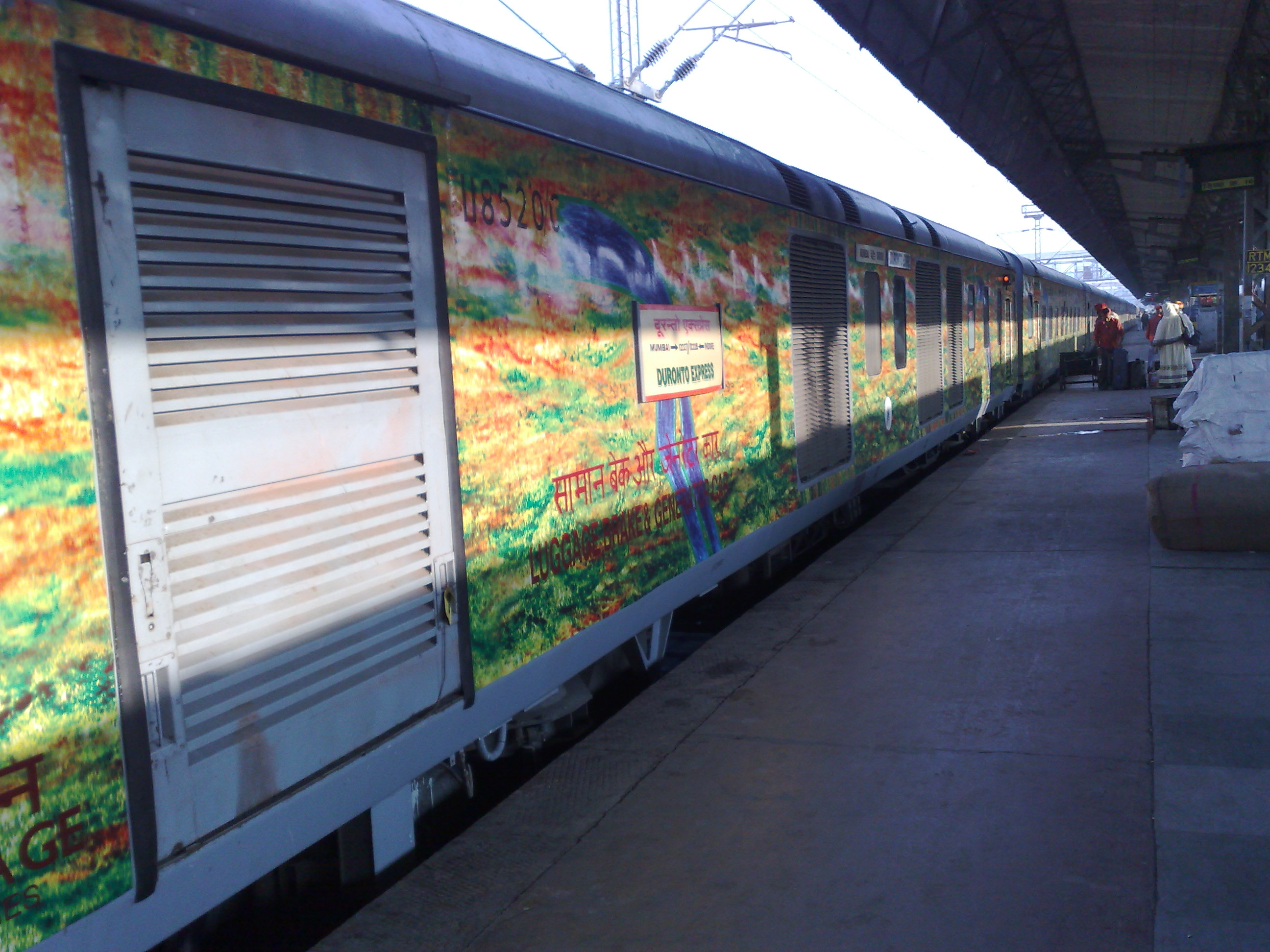
12227 Indore Duronto Express at Ratlam Junction

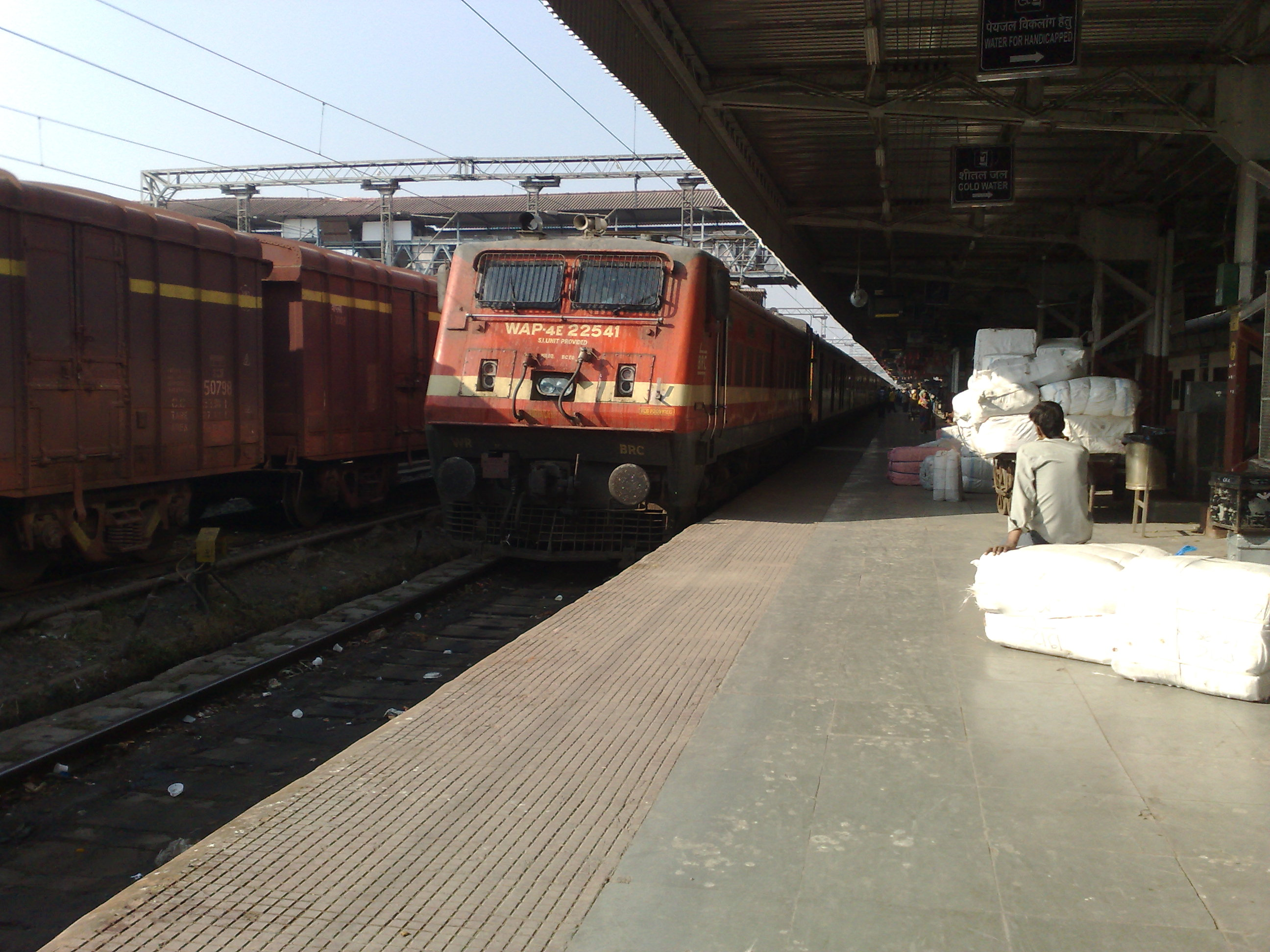
WAP-4E with the Indore Duronto Express at Ujjain Junction

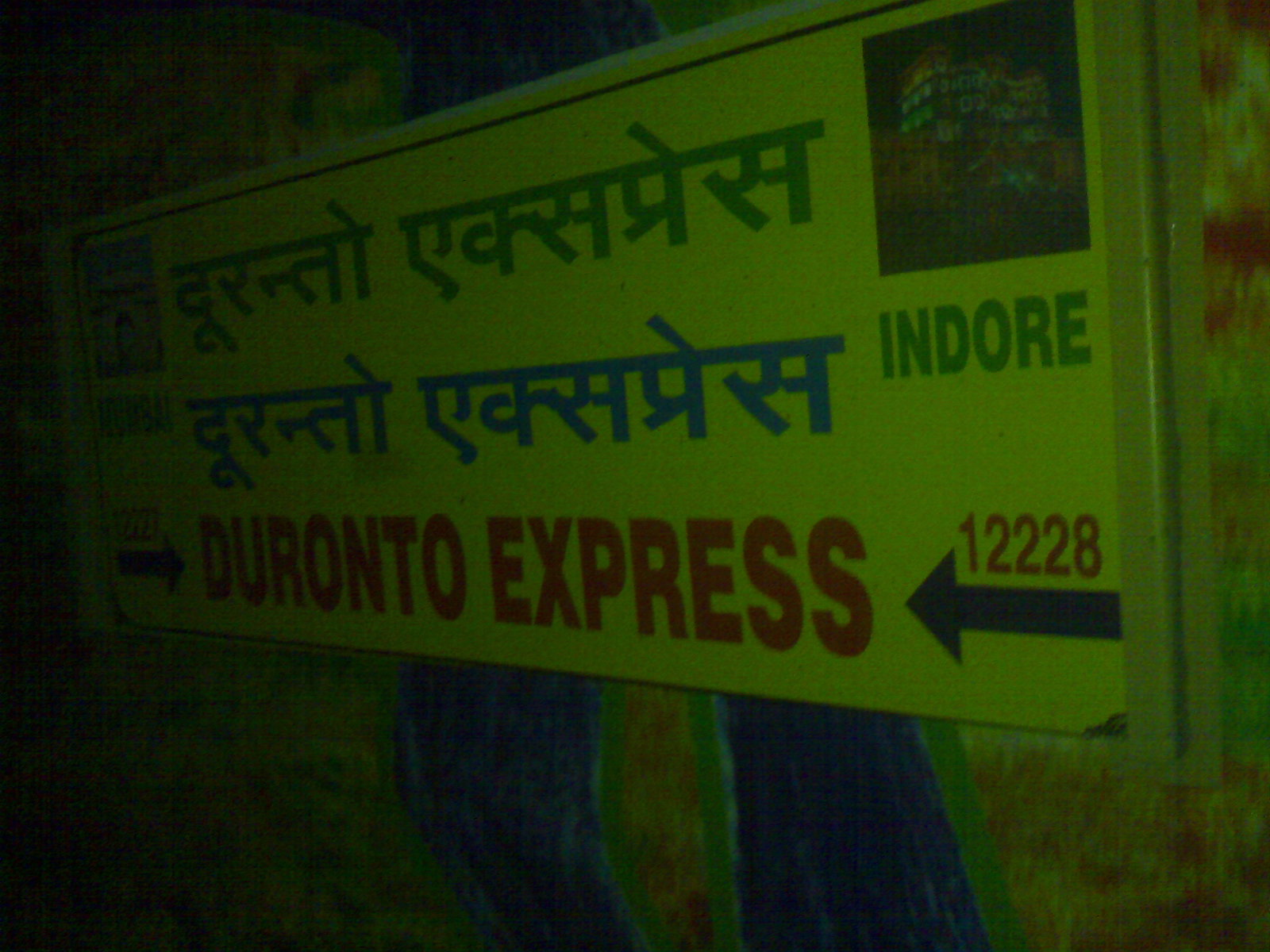
Indore Duronto captured at night

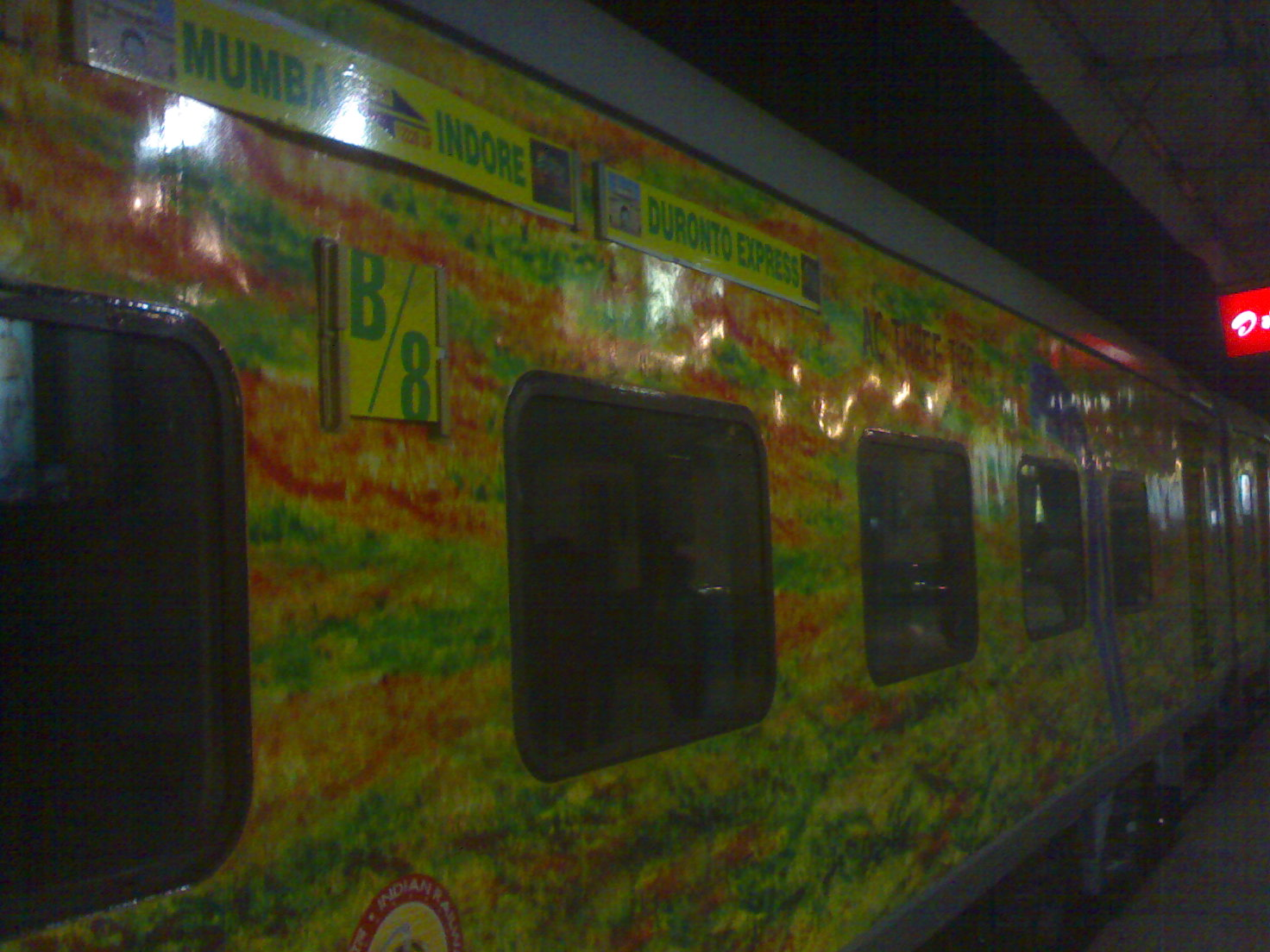
Indore Duronto AC Coach at night

== See also ==
- Duronto Express
- Mumbai Central railway station
- Indore Junction BG
- Avantika Express
