= Palsana railway station =

Railway station in Rajasthan, India

Palsana

General information
- Location: Palsana, Sikar district, Rajasthan; India
- Coordinates: 27.485884°N 75.377766°E
- System: Indian Railways station
- Owner: Indian Railways
- Operator: North Western Railway
- Line: Churu–Ringas line
- Platforms: 2
- Tracks: 2

Construction
- Structure type: Standard (on ground station)
- Parking: Yes

Other information
- Status: Functioning
- Station code: PLSN
- Zone(s): North Western Railway
- Division(s): Jaipur
Location
- Location within India Location within Rajasthan

Palsana railway station is a railway station in Sikar district, Rajasthan. Its code is PLSN. It serves Palsana town. The station consists of 2 platforms. Passenger, Express trains halt here.
