= Bikaner–Delhi Sarai Rohilla Intercity Express =

Lalgarh - Delhi Sarai Rohilla Intercity Express
Overview
- Service type: Superfast Express
- First service: 11 November 2011; 14 years ago
- Current operator: North Western Railways

Route
- Termini: Lalgarh Junction (LGH); Delhi Sarai Rohilla (DEE)
- Stops: 13
- Distance travelled: 461 km (286 mi)
- Average journey time: 8 hours 20 mins
- Service frequency: Daily
- Train number: 22471 / 22472

On-board services
- Classes: AC 1 tier, AC 2 tier, AC 3 tier, Sleeper class, General Unreserved
- Sleeping arrangements: Yes
- Catering facilities: On-board catering E-catering
- Observation facilities: Rake sharing with 12981/12982 Chetak Express

Technical
- Rolling stock: LHB coach
- Track gauge: 1,676 mm (5 ft 6 in)
- Operating speed: 110 km/h (68 mph) maximum, 55.3 km/h (34 mph) average including halts

The Lalgarh - Delhi Sarai Rohilla Intercity Express is a Superfast Express train belonging to Indian Railways – North Western Railway zone that runs between Lalgarh Junction and Delhi Sarai Rohilla in India.

It operates as train number 22471 from Lalgarh Junction to Delhi Sarai Rohilla and as train number 22472 in the reverse direction, serving the states of Rajasthan, Haryana and Delhi.

== Coaches ==
22471/22472 Bikaner–Delhi Sarai Rohilla Intercity Express has 1 AC 2 tier, 5 AC 3 tier, 8 Sleeper class, 6 General Unreserved and 2 SLR (Seating cum Luggage Rake) coaches. It does not carry a pantry car.

As is customary with most train services in India, coach composition may be amended at the discretion of Indian Railways depending on demand.

== Service ==
Despite its "superfast" designation, the 22471 Bikaner–Delhi Sarai Rohilla Intercity Express averages only 56.08 km/h, taking 8 hours 10 mins to cover a distance of 458 km (285 mi). It takes 8 hours 00 mins to cover the same distance (57.25 km/h) as the 22472 Delhi Sarai Rohilla–Bikaner Intercity Express.

As the average speed of the train is above 55 km/h (34 mph), as per Indian Railways rules, its fare includes a Superfast surcharge.

== Routeing ==
22471/22472 Bikaner–Delhi Sarai Rohilla Intercity Express runs from Lalgarh Junction via Bikaner Junction, Shri Dungargarh, Ratangarh Junction, Churu Junction, Sadulpur Junction, Loharu Junction, Mahendergarh,Rewari Junction, Gurgaon, Delhi Cantonment to Delhi Sarai Rohilla.

== Traction ==
As large sections of the route are yet to be fully electrified, a Bhagat Ki Kothi-based WDP-4 / WDP-4B / WDP-4D locomotive powers the train for its entire journey.

== Rake sharing ==
The train shares its rake with 12981/12982 Chetak Express.

== See also ==
- Delhi Sarai Rohilla railway station
- Bikaner Junction railway station
- Delhi Sarai Rohilla–Bikaner Express (via Sri Ganganagar)
- Delhi Sarai Rohilla–Bikaner Superfast Express
