= Sainik Express =

Train in India

Overview
- Service type: Express
- First service: 21 June 2017; 8 years ago
- Current operator: Northern Railway zone

Route
- Termini: Delhi Sarai Rohilla (DEE); Jaipur Junction (JP)
- Stops: 22
- Distance travelled: 404 km (251 mi)
- Average journey time: 8h 55m
- Service frequency: Daily
- Train number: 19701 / 19702

On-board services
- Classes: Second Class sitting, AC 3 Tier, Sleeper 3 Tier, Unreserved
- Sleeping arrangements: Yes
- Catering facilities: No
- Entertainment facilities: No

Technical
- Rolling stock: 2
- Track gauge: 1,676 mm (5 ft 6 in)
- Operating speed: 45.29 km/h (28.14 mph)

The 19701 / 19702 Sainik Express is an Express train belonging to Northern Railway zone that runs between Jaipur Junction of Rajasthan and Delhi Sarai Rohilla of New Delhi, the capital city of India.

== History ==
During the Meter Gauge prior to 2009/2010, the Legendary Shekhawati Express having Train Number 9733/9734 used to Ply between Delhi Sarai Rohilla & Jaipur Junction. Timings for 9733 Shekhawati Express was Jaipur Junction 18:50 hrs; Ringas Junction 20:10 hrs; Sikar Junction 21:20 hrs; Loharu Junction 00.50 hrs with 30 mins stop for reversal; Rewari Junction 02:50 hrs; Delhi Sarai Rohilla 04.50 hrs. Timings for 9734 Shekhawati Express was Delhi Sarai Rohilla 23:00 hrs; Rewari Junction 01:05 hrs; Loharu Junction 03.30 with 30 mins stop for reversal; Sikar Junction 06:40 hrs; Ringas Junction 07:45 hrs; Jaipur Junction 09:00 hrs; For Gauge conversion, this train was permanently withdrawn from service. Shekhawati Express used to cover 401 kilometres (249 mi) in 10:00 hrs running at 40.10 kilometres per hour (24.92 mph) average speed. The train was re-inaugurated as Delhi Sarai Rohilla–Sikar Express on 21 June 2017 by the Railway Minister of India during the completion of conversion of Sikar–Loharu railway line into 5 ft 6 in (1,676 mm) broad gauge. Later on 1 March 2019, it was extended to Ringas Junction after the demand of Passengers for Direct train to Delhi and given name as Sainik Express. And, thereafter on 30 October 2019, again extended to Jaipur Junction for more connection and after gauge conversion between Ringas and Jaipur railway line into 5 ft 6 in (1,676 mm) broad gauge.

== Service ==
This train covers the distance of 404 km (251 mi) average time of this train is 8 hours and 55 minutes with an average speed of 45.29 kilometres per hour (28.14 mph) vice versa as Train number 19701/19702.

== Routes and halts ==
The Important Halts of the train are :

- Delhi Cantonment
- Gurgaon
- Pataudi Road
- Rewari Junction
- Loharu Junction
- Surajgarh
- Chirawa
- Ratan Shahar
- Jhunjhunu
- Nua
- Dundlod Mukundgarh
- Nawalgarh
- Sikar Junction
- Ringas Junction
- Jaipur Junction

== Coach composition ==
The train consists of 13 coaches:

- 1 AC III Tier
- 4 Sleeper coaches
- 3 Second Class sitting
- 4 General
- 2 Second-class Luggage/parcel van

== See also ==
- Sikar railway station
- Delhi Sarai Rohilla railway station
