= Bikaner–Haridwar Express =

Train in India

Overview
- Service type: Express
- First service: 4 December 2017; 7 years ago
- Current operator(s): North Western Railway

Route
- Termini: Bikaner (BKN); Haridwar (HW)
- Stops: 17
- Distance travelled: 755 km (469 mi)
- Average journey time: 15 hours 35 mins
- Service frequency: Tri-Weekly
- Train number(s): 14717 / 14718

On-board services
- Class(es): AC first, AC 2 tier, AC 3 tier, Sleeper class, General Unreserved
- Seating arrangements: Yes
- Sleeping arrangements: Yes
- Catering facilities: E-catering only
- Baggage facilities: Available
- Other facilities: Below the seats

Technical
- Rolling stock: ICF coach
- Track gauge: 1,676 mm (5 ft 6 in)
- Operating speed: 110 km/h (68 mph) maximum, 49 km/h (30 mph) average including halts.

The 14717 / 14718 Bikaner-Haridwar Express is also known as Gita Ganga Express is an Express train belonging to North Western Railway zone of Indian Railways that run between Bikaner Junction and Haridwar in India.

== Background ==
This train was inaugurated on 4 December 2017, from Haridwar flagged off by Rajen Gohen, State Minister of Railways for direct connectivity between Bikaner and Haridwar.

== Service ==
Frequency of this train is tri-weekly and it covers the distance of 755 km with an average speed of 49 km/h on both sides.

== Route & halts ==
The train runs from Bikaner Junction via Ratangarh Junction, Churu Junction, Hisar Junction, Bhiwani Junction, Rohtak Junction, Panipat Junction, Ambala Cantonment, Saharanpur Junction, Roorkee to Haridwar.

== Traction ==
As the route is fully electrified, it is hauled by a Ghaziabad Loco Shed based WAP-5 electric locomotive from end to end.
