= Mumbai Central–Hisar Duronto Express =

Train in India

Mumbai Central – Hisar Junction Duronto Express
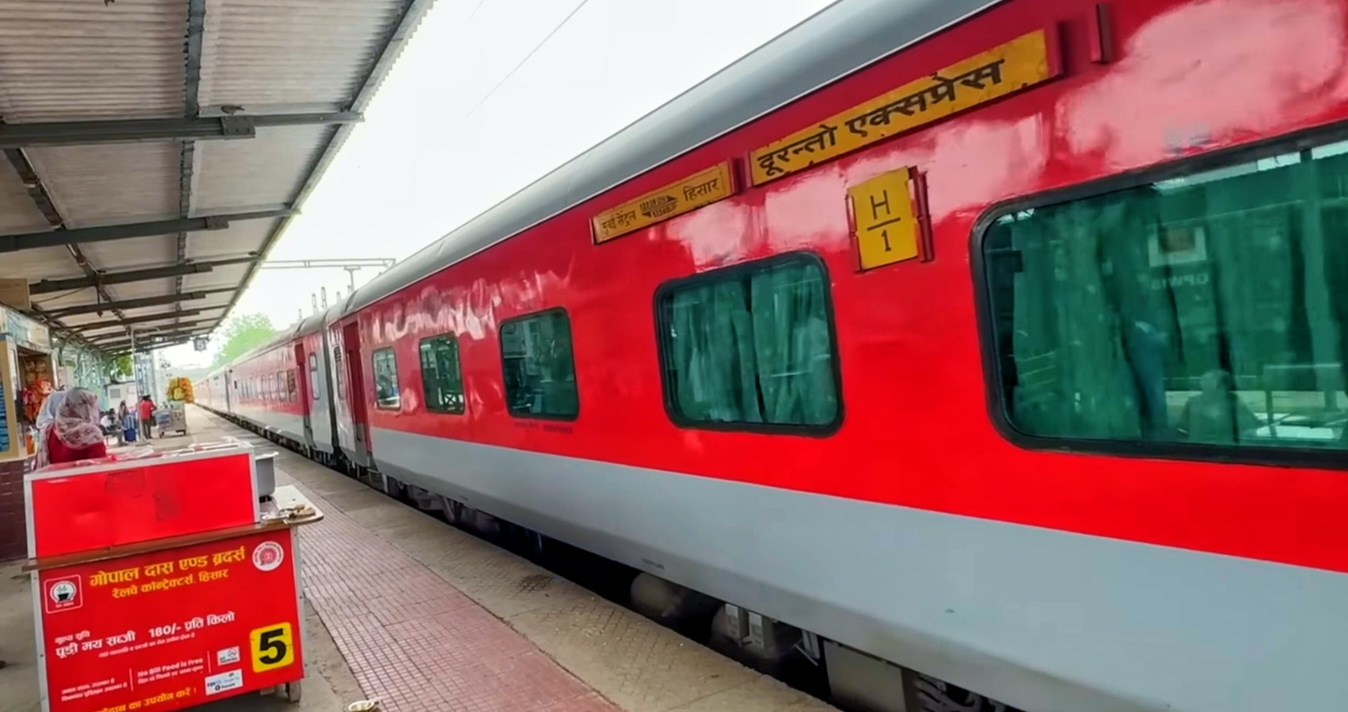
- Mumbai Central – Hisar Junction Duronto Express At Hisar Junction railway station

Overview
- Service type: Duronto Express
- First service: 3 April 2011; 15 years ago
- Current operator: Western Railways

Route
- Termini: Mumbai Central (MMCT); Hisar Junction (HSR)
- Stops: 12
- Distance travelled: 1,512 km (940 mi)
- Average journey time: 22 hours 10 minutes
- Service frequency: Bi-Weekly
- Train number: 12239 / 12240

On-board services
- Classes: AC 1st Class; AC 2 tier AC 3 tier AC Chair Car
- Seating arrangements: Yes
- Sleeping arrangements: Yes
- Catering facilities: Yes, pantry car attached
- Observation facilities: Rake sharing with 12227/12228 Mumbai Central–Indore Duronto Express and 22209/22210 Mumbai Central–Hazrat Nizamuddin Duronto Express

Technical
- Rolling stock: LHB coach
- Track gauge: 1,676 mm (5 ft 6 in)
- Electrification: 25 kV 50 Hz AC Overhead line
- Operating speed: 70 km/h (43 mph) average including halts

The 12239 / 12240 Mumbai Central–Hisar Duronto Express is a Duronto Express train of the Indian Railways which belongs to Western Railway zone that runs between Mumbai Central of Maharashtra and Hisar Junction of Haryana in India.

== Coach composition ==
The rake has 4 AC 3 tier Economy, 6 AC 3 tier coaches, 3 AC 2 tier coaches, 1 AC First Class, 1 Pantry car and 2 EOG cars making a total of 14 coaches.

As is customary with Indian Railways, coaches are added/removed as per the demand.

== Service ==
It is the fastest train on the Mumbai–Jaipur sector. It averages 71.42 km/h as 12239 Duronto Express covering 1512 km in 21 hrs 10 mins and 68.2 km/h as 12240 Duronto Express covering 1512 km in 22 hrs 10 mins.

Some of the other trains that cover the Mumbai–Jaipur sectors are 12955/56 Jaipur Superfast Express, 12979/80 Jaipur–Bandra Terminus Superfast Express, 14701/02 Amrapur Aravali Express, 22933/34 Bandra Terminus–Jaipur Weekly Superfast Express, 12215/16 Delhi Sarai Rohilla–Bandra Terminus Garib Rath Express which initially ran up to Jaipur, later extended to Delhi Sarai Rohilla.

== Train details ==
This train had its inaugural run on 3 April 2011. It was & still is a 2 days a week service. It is a fully AC train & uses LHB rakes. Until 17 August 2021, it used to ply between Mumbai Central and Jaipur Junction but then, it was extended up to Hisar Junction.

== Commercial halts ==
It has halts at Jaipur Junction, Vadodara Junction, Ratlam Junction, Kota Junction

Sawai Madhopur Junction & Sadulpur Junction is where it reverses direction of travel.

The train is hauled by an electric locomotive

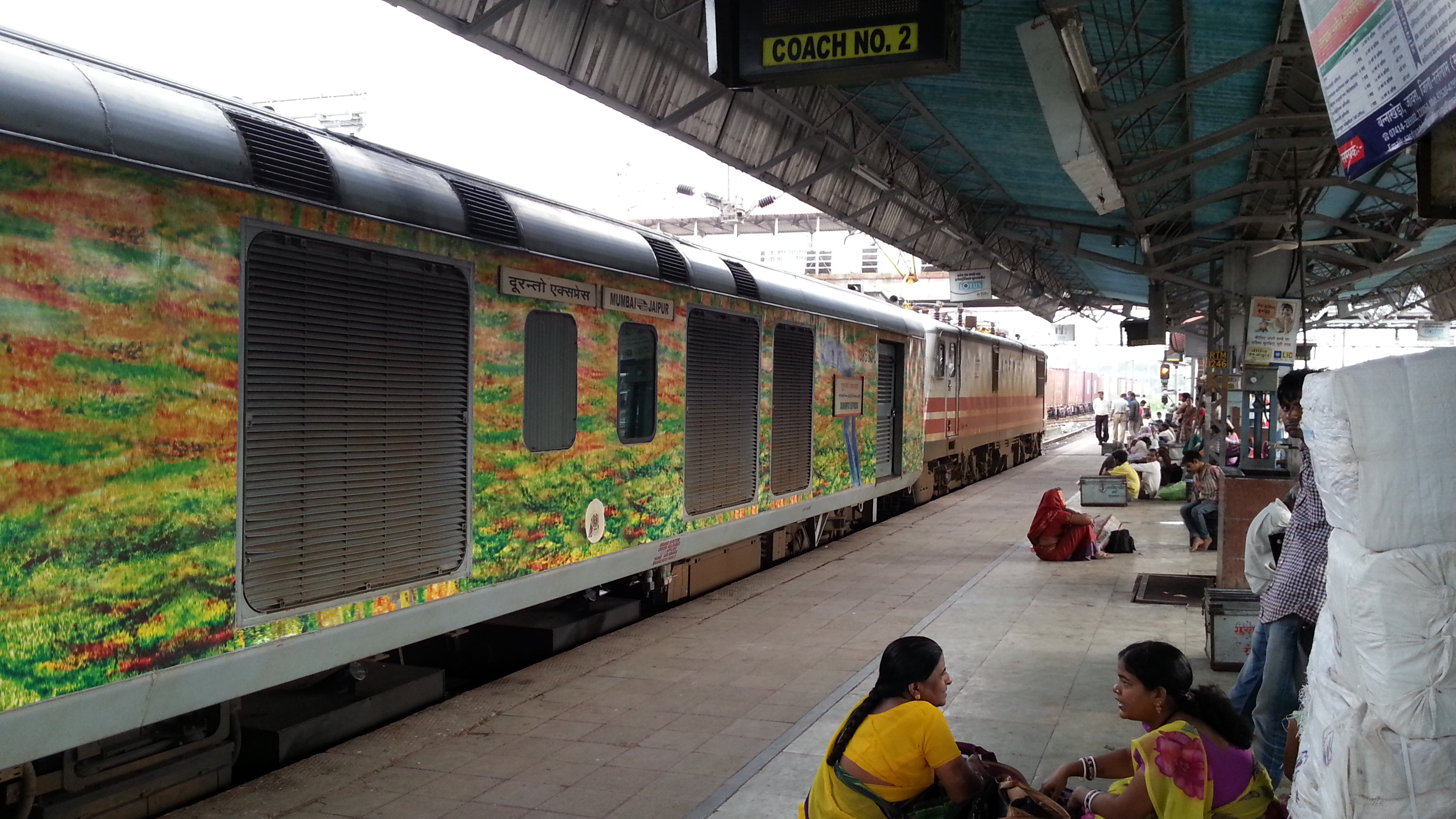
12239 Hisar Duronto Express standing at Ratlam Junction with WAP-5 locomotive of Vadodara shed

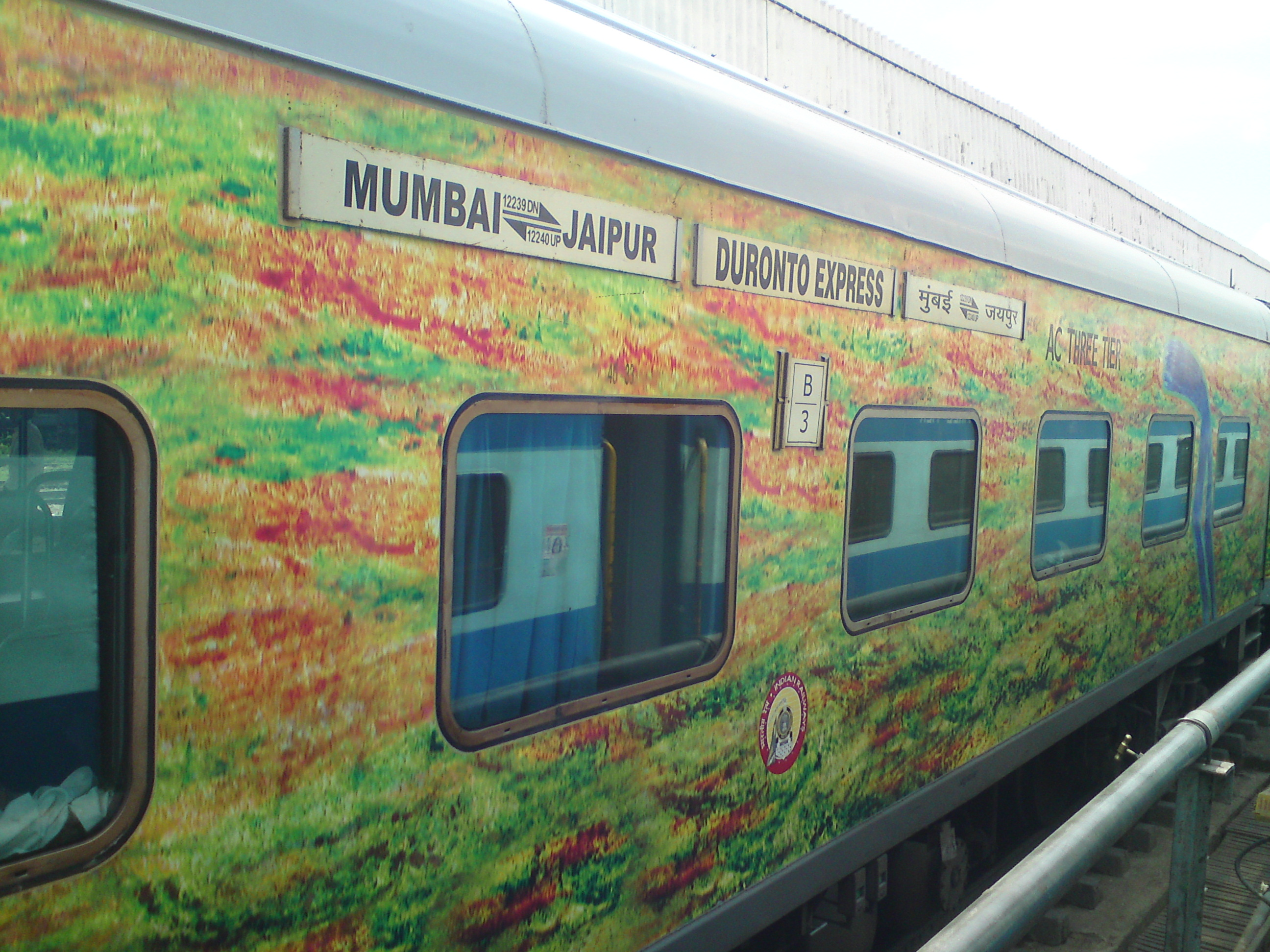
Mumbai central - Hisar Duronto Express – AC 3 tier coach

== Time table ==
- 12239 Mumbai Central–Hisar Duronto Express leaves Mumbai Central every Tuesday & Sunday and reaches Hisar Junction the next day.
- 12240 Hisar–Mumbai Central Duronto Express leaves Hisar Junction every Tuesday & Thursday and reaches Mumbai Central the next day.

== See also ==
- Duronto Express
- Mumbai Central railway station
- Jaipur Junction railway station
- Jaipur Superfast Express
