= Shri Dungargarh railway station =

Railway station in Rajasthan, India

Shri Dungargarh

General information
- Location: Shri Dungargarh, Bikaner district, Rajasthan; India
- Coordinates: 28.070764°N 74.005951°E
- System: Indian Railways station
- Owner: Indian Railways
- Operator: North Western Railway
- Line: Ratangarh–Bikaner line
- Platforms: 2
- Tracks: 2

Construction
- Structure type: Standard (on ground station)
- Parking: Yes

Other information
- Status: Functioning
- Station code: SDGH
- Zone(s): North Western Railway
- Division(s): Bikaner
Location
- Location within India Location within Rajasthan

Shri Dungargarh railway station is a railway station in Bikaner district, Rajasthan. Its code is SDGH. It serves Shri Dungargarh town. The station consists of 2 platforms. Passenger, Express, and Superfast trains halt here.

== Trains ==
The following trains halt at Shri Dungargarh railway station in both directions:

- Bikaner–Haridwar Express
- Bikaner–Delhi Sarai Rohilla Superfast Express
- Howrah–Jaisalmer Superfast Express
- Indore–Bikaner Mahamana Express
- Bikaner–Delhi Sarai Rohilla Intercity Express
- Secunderabad–Hisar Express
