= Delhi Cantonment railway station =

Railway station in Delhi, India

Delhi Cantonment
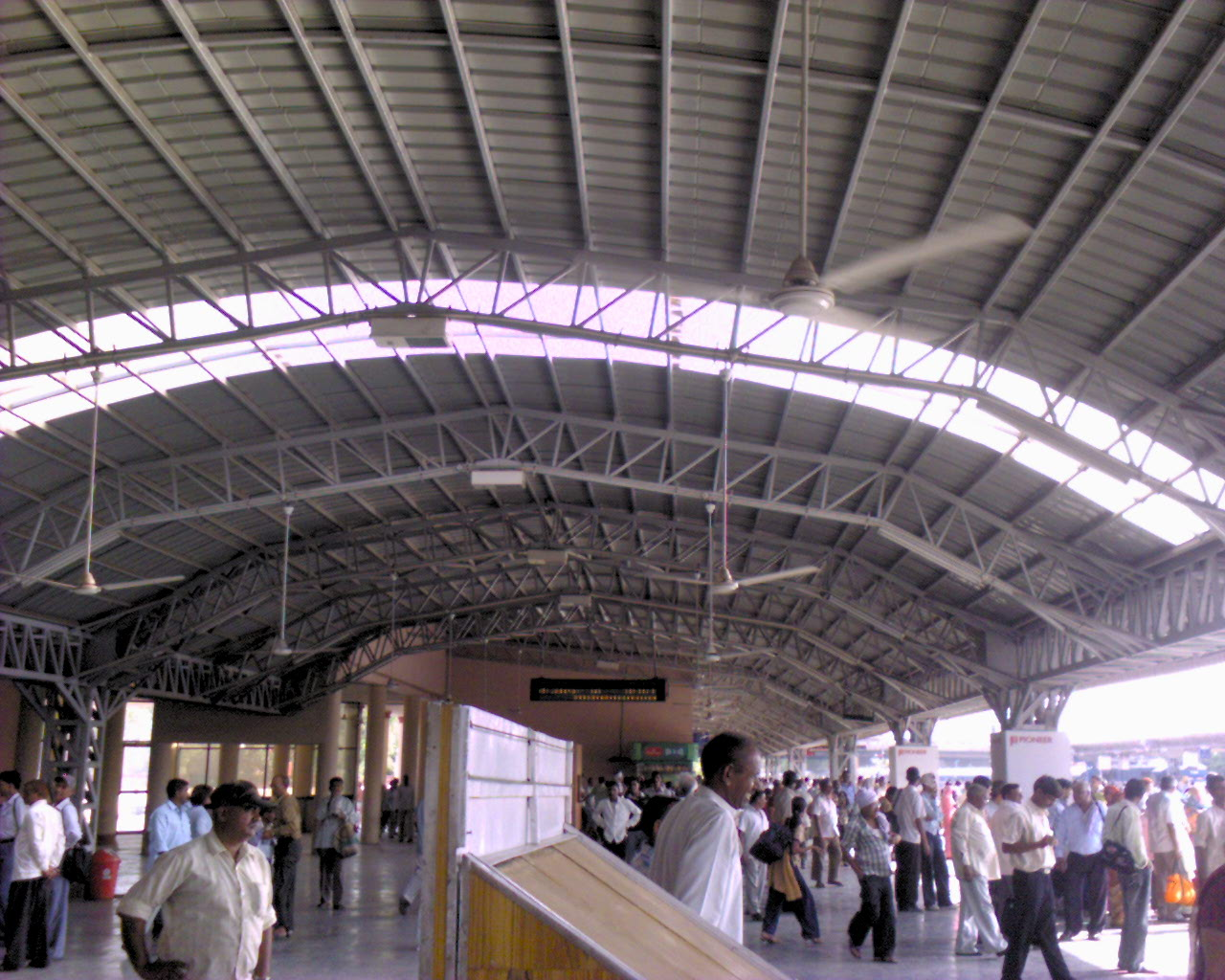

General information
- Location: Delhi Cantonment, Delhi; India
- Coordinates: 28°36′43″N 77°06′56″E
- System: Indian Railways station
- Owner: Indian Railways
- Operator: Northern Railway
- Line: Delhi–Ahmedabad mainline
- Platforms: 4
- Tracks: 4

Construction
- Structure type: At grade
- Parking: Yes
- Cycle facilities: Yes

Other information
- Status: Active
- Station code: DEC
- Zone(s): Northern Railway
- Division(s): Delhi

Passengers
- 2018: 20,000
Location
- Location within India Location within Delhi

The Delhi Cantonment railway station, also known as Delhi Cantt. (station code: DEC), is a railway station in Delhi Cantonment in India. It serves as an intermediate stop for trains coming from Delhi or Chandigarh and going towards Rajasthan and Gujarat via Rewari, and a small number of trains originate and terminate at this station.

== History ==
Initially operated as a metre-gauge railway station, in 1991 it was converted to broad gauge.

In 2025-26, it underwent ₹335 crore "airport-like" redevelopment with a new station building with separate arrival and departure areas, escalators, lifts, and adequate parking.

== Major trains ==
The list of trains which originate/stops from/at the Delhi Cantt. station are:

- Jodhpur–Delhi Cantonment Vande Bharat Express (26841/26842)
- Bikaner–Delhi Cantonment Vande Bharat Express (26471/26472)
- Ajmer–Chandigarh Vande Bharat Express (20977/20978)
- Swarna Jayanti Rajdhani Express (12957/12958)
- New Delhi–Daurai (Ajmer) Shatabdi Express (12015/12016)
- Jaipur–Delhi Sarai Rohilla AC Double Decker Express (12985/12986)
- Ajmer–Delhi Sarai Rohilla Jan Shatabdi Express (12065/12066)
- Rajasthan Sampark Kranti Express (12463/12464)
- Delhi Sarai Rohilla–Bikaner Rajasthan Sampark Kranti Express (22463/22464)
- Bhagat Ki Kothi–Kamakhya Express (15623/15624)
- Udaipur City–New Jalpaiguri Express (19601/19602)
- Ayodhya Cantt - Delhi Express (14205/14206)
- Delhi–Ambala Cantonment Intercity Express (14521/14522)
- Sainik Express (19701/19702)
- Sirsa Express (14085/14086)
- Delhi Sarai Rohilla–Bandra Terminus Garib Rath Express (12215/12216)

== Gallery ==
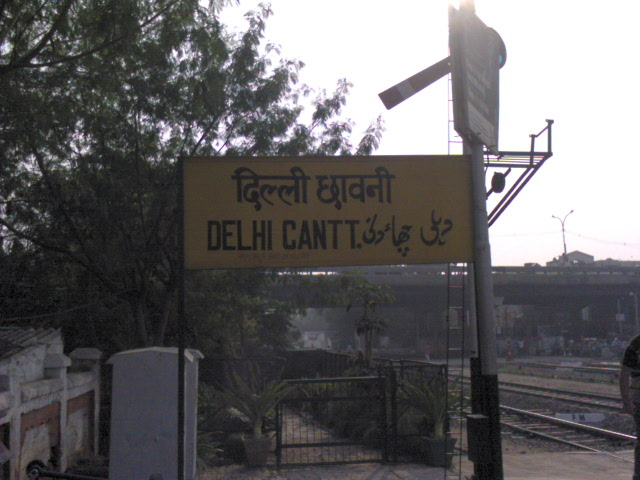
Station sign at Delhi Cantonment railway station.

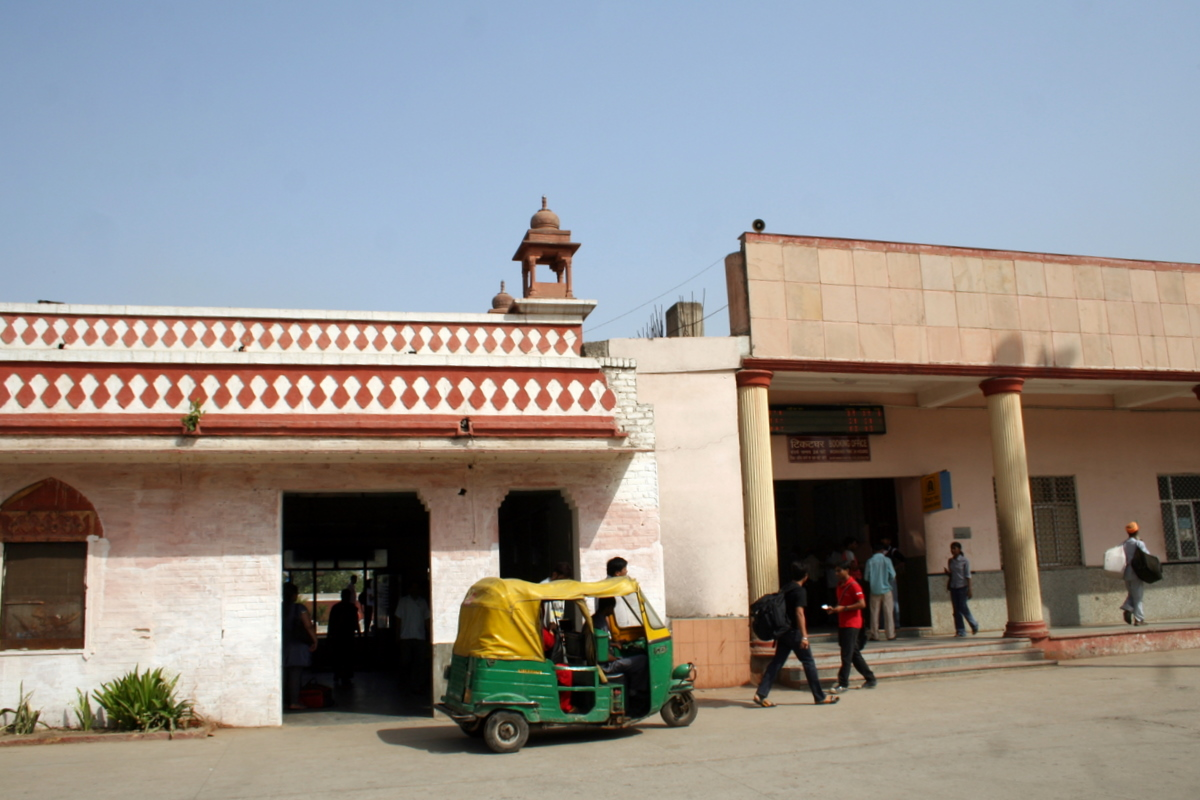
Delhi Cantonment Station Old and New facade.

== See also ==
- Anand Vihar Terminal
- New Delhi railway station
- Delhi Junction railway station
- Sarai Rohilla
- Hazrat Nizamuddin railway station
- Transport in Delhi
- Transport in Haryana
