= Mahendragarh railway station =

Railway station in Haryana, India

Mahendragarh Railway Station
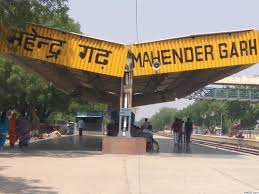
- Mahendragarh Railway Station in Mahendragarh, Haryana, India

General information
- Location: Station Road, Mahendragarh, Haryana; India
- Coordinates: 28°16′51″N 76°08′53″E
- Elevation: 246 metres (807 ft)
- System: Indian Railways Station
- Owner: Indian Railways
- Operator: Indian Railways
- Line: Delhi–Bikaner line
- Platforms: 2
- Tracks: 12
- Bus routes: 1

Construction
- Structure type: Terminus
- Parking: Available (paid)

Other information
- Status: Functional
- Station code: MHRG
- Zone(s): North Western Railway zone
- Division(s): Bikaner

History
- Opened: 1940
- Rebuilt: 2009–11

Passengers
- 1000–2000
Location
- Location within Haryana Location within India

Mahendragarh Railway Station, station code MHRG, is a major railway station of the Indian Railways serving the city of Mahendragarh in the Mahendragarh district in Indian state of Haryana. It is in the Bikaner Division of the North Western Railway zone and lies on the New Delhi–Rewari–Bikaner route.

== Location ==
Mahendragarh railway junction station is located 114 kilometres (71 mi) southwest of old Delhi and 100 kilometres (62 mi) southwest of the nearest large airport is located at New Delhi.

== History ==
The main railway line from Bikaner Junction to Rewari Junction was originally built by Jodhpur–Bikaner Railway company of Bikaner Princely State portion as metre-gauge line during the 19th and 20th century also. This line was opened in different phases during the construction period. The first phase, from Bikaner Junction to Ratangarh Junction which also called as Bikaner–Ratangarh chord line was opened on 24 November 1912. The second phase, from Ratangarh Junction to Churu Junction was opened on 22 May 1910. The third phase, from Churu Junction to Sadulpur Junction was opened on 8 July 1911. The fourth phase, from Sadulpur Junction to Rewari Junction was sanctioned on 4 March 1937 and after opened at 1 March 1941.

=== Beginning and growth ===
Mahendragarh railway station was purposed in 1896 and established in 1940 Delhi–Rewari–Bikaner railway line was transferred to Bikaner Division of newly formed Northern Railway zone in 1952.

=== Gauge conversion ===
After that, the conversion into 5 ft 6 in (1,676 mm) broad gauge was completed through into different section starting from the first section between Rewari Junction to Sadulpur Junction was opened on 17 September 2008, later the second section between Sadulpur Junction and Ratangarh Junction was opened on 1 August 2010 and thereafter the third section between Ratangarh Junction and Bikaner Junction was opened on 30 March 2011.

=== Electrification ===
Electrification of main line was started on 11 February 2019, on the first section between Rewari and Sadulpur which was declared on 2017-18 rail budget, was completed on 4 March 2020, with two stages. and the remaining sections such as Sadulpur–Churu, Churu–Ratangarh and Ratangarh–Bikaner is going under electrification.

== Trains ==
The following is a list of a few trains stopping at Rewari railway station.

Train no.	Train name	From	To	Scheduled dep
19727	Sikar – Rewari Express	Sikar	Rewari	08:35

== See also ==
- Indian Railways
- Mahendragarh
- Delhi Sarai Rohilla
- Delhi Junction
- New Delhi
- Hazrat Nizamuddin
