= Sikar Junction railway station =

Railway station in Rajasthan, India

General information
- Location: Kalyan Circle, National Highway 52, Sikar, Rajasthan; India
- Coordinates: 27.616760°N 75.153264°E
- Elevation: 432 metres (1,417 ft)
- System: Indian Railways station
- Owner: Indian Railways
- Operator: Jaipur railway division
- Lines: Sikar–Loharu line Jaipur–Churu line
- Platforms: 4
- Tracks: 5
- Connections: Auto stand

Construction
- Structure type: Standard (on-ground station)
- Parking: yes
- Cycle facilities: No

Other information
- Status: Functioning
- Station code: SIKR
- Fare zone: North Western Railway
Location
- Location within India Location within Rajasthan

Sikar Junction railway station is a model railway station in Sikar district, Rajasthan. Its code is SIKR. It serves Sikar city.

The station consists of four platforms. Sikar is connected through a broad-gauge railway line section to Delhi, Churu, and Jaipur. And there is a proposal since 10 years for a new line Sikar to Nokha via Sujangarh.

== Major lines ==
- Delhi Sarai Rohilla–Sikar Express
- Amrapur Aravali Express
- Mumbai–Jaipur Duronto Express
