= Ringas Junction railway station =

Railway station in Rajasthan, India

Ringas Junction

General information
- Location: Ringas, Sikar district, Rajasthan; India
- Coordinates: 27.3735°N 75.5635°E
- Elevation: 482 metres (1,581 ft)
- System: Indian Railways station
- Owner: Indian Railways
- Operator: North Western Railways
- Platforms: 3
- Tracks: 7
- Connections: Auto stand

Construction
- Structure type: Standard (on-ground station)
- Parking: Yes
- Cycle facilities: No
- Accessible: Available

Other information
- Status: Functioning
- Station code: RGS
- Zone(s): North Western Railway zone
- Division(s): Jaipur
Location
- Location within Rajasthan Location within India

Ringas Junction railway station is a model railway station (as declared by Indian Railways) in Sikar district, Rajasthan, India. Its code is RGS & is located 58.5 kilometres (36.4 mi) from Jaipur Junction. The station consists of three well-sheltered platforms. It has basic facilities including water and sanitation. The station was main metre-gauge junction till 2005, but after the construction of the broad-gauge track from Rewari and Narnaul in the north to Phulera and Ajmer in the south, it is operational as an important BG junction now. The 200.4 kilometres (124.5 mi) long track from Churu to Jaipur via Sikar & Ringas has been converted to broad gauge.
