= Loharu Junction railway station =

Railway station in Haryana, India

Loharu Junction
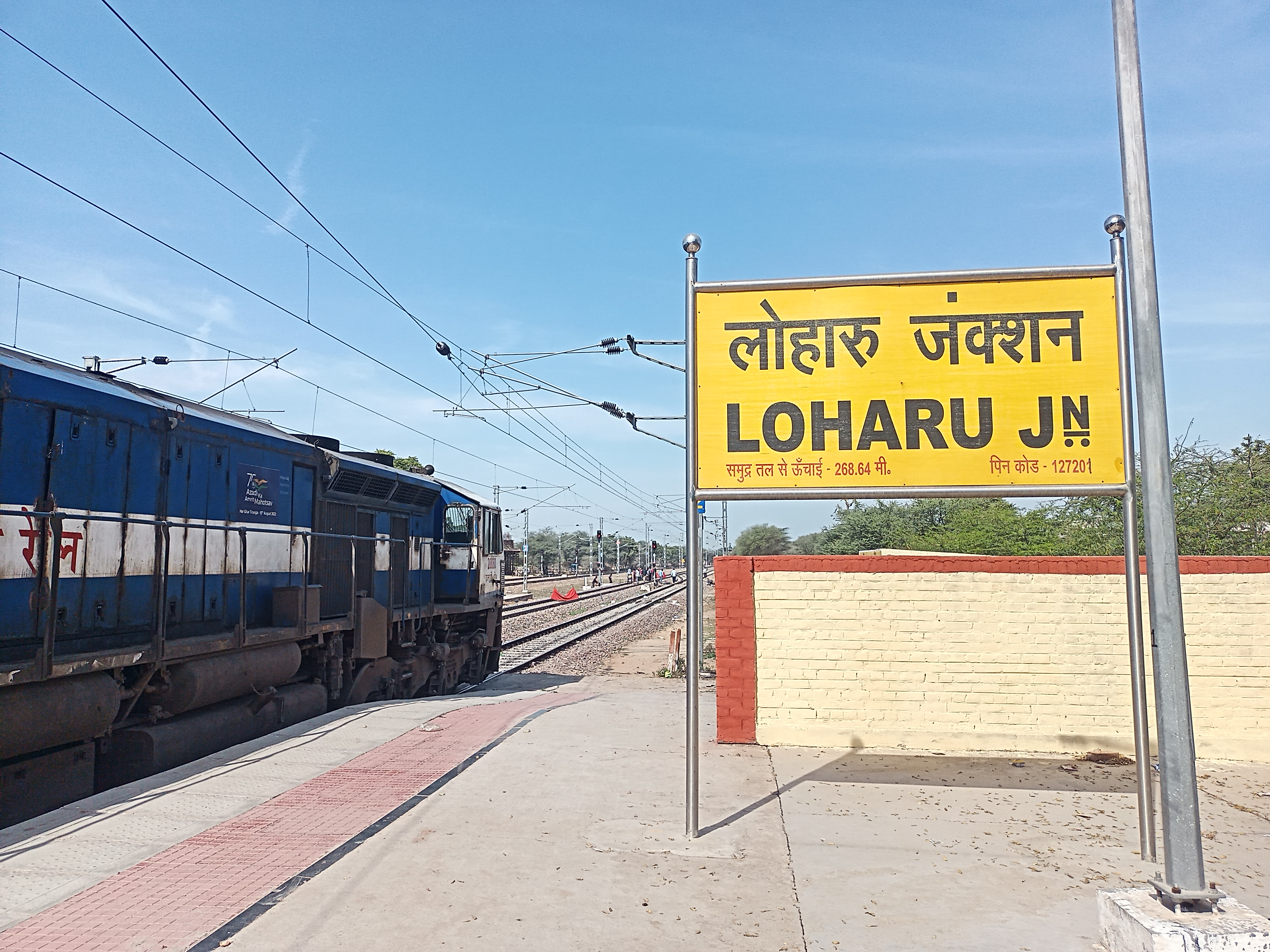

General information
- Location: Loharu, Bhiwani district, Haryana; India
- Coordinates: 28.426728°N 75.803179°E
- Elevation: 268.64 m (881.4 ft)
- System: Indian Railways station
- Owner: Indian Railways
- Operator: North Western Railway
- Lines: Bikaner–Rewari line Sikar–Loharu line
- Platforms: 4
- Tracks: 4

Construction
- Structure type: Standard (on ground station)
- Parking: Yes

Other information
- Status: Functioning
- Station code: LHU
- Zone(s): North Western Railway
- Division(s): Bikaner
Location
- Location within India Location within Haryana

Loharu Junction Railway Station is a railway station in Bhiwani district, Haryana. Its code is LHU. It serves Loharu & Pilani City. The station consists of 4 platforms. Passenger, Express, Superfast, Duronto and Vande Bharat trains halt here.

== Trains ==
The following trains halt at Loharu Junction railway station in both directions:

- Sainik Express
- Sikar - Delhi Sarai Rohilla Intercity Express
- Kamakhya - Bhagat Ki Kothi Express
- Jodhpur - Delhi Sarai Rohilla Superfast Express
- Bikaner - Delhi Sarai Rohilla Superfast Express
- Salasar Superfast Express
- Howrah - Bikaner Weekly Superfast Express
- Lalgarh - Delhi Sarai Rohilla Intercity Express
- Sealdah - Bikaner Duronto Express
- Bikaner - Delhi Cantonment Vande Bharat Express
- Mumbai Central - Hisar Duronto Express
- Hyderabad - Hisar Express
- Kota - Sirsa Express
- Howrah - Barmer Superfast Express
- Prayagraj - Lalgarh Superfast Express
- Shri Ganganagar - Tilak Bridge Express
- Kakinada Town - Hisar Express
- Jodhpur - Rewari Express
- Hanumangarh - Jaipur Express
- Hisar - Tirupati Express
- Hisar - Khadki Express
