= Jaipur railway division =

Railway division of India

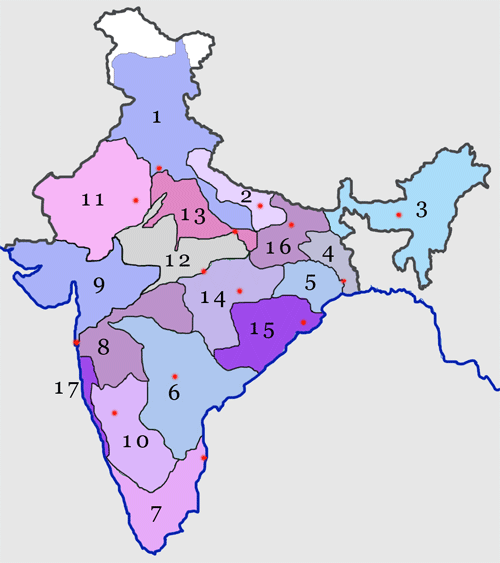
- 11-North Western Railway

Overview
- Headquarters: Jaipur Junction railway station
- Locale: Rajasthan
- Predecessor: North Western Railway zone

Technical
- Track gauge: Mixed

Other
- Website: www.nwr.indianrailways.gov.in

Jaipur railway division is one of the four railway divisions under the jurisdiction of North Western Railway zone of the Indian Railways. This railway division was formed on 5 November 1951. Its headquarters are located in Jaipur in the Indian state of Rajasthan.

Ajmer railway division, Bikaner railway division and Jodhpur railway division are the other three railway divisions under NWR Zone headquartered at Jaipur. This division is one of the key enabler of the Delhi Mumbai Industrial Corridor Project by virtue of running parts of the railways 1,500 km long network of Western Dedicated Freight Corridor.

== Rail transport infrastructure ==
The zone has the following types of locomotive engines: (Legends: W - broad gauge, D - diesel, G - goods, M - mixed, P - passenger)

- Phulera Junction railway station sheds: YDM-4 meter gauge locomotives

== Medical Facilities ==
For the employees and their families, the division also has the following healthcare facilities:

- Zonal Hospitals
  - Jaipur Zonal Railway Hospital near Jaipur Junction railway station
- Divisional Hospitals
  - None
- Sub-Divisional Hospitals
  - Bandikui Sub-Divisional Railway Hospital near Bandikui Junction railway station (Jaipur division),
- Health Units, several (total 29 across the whole division, including 3 other zones)
- First Aid Posts, unknown (no more than a total of two across the whole zone)

== Training ==
The zone has the following training institutes:

- <missing>
- North Western Railway zone
  - Route km: broad gauge 2,575.03 kilometres (1,600.05 mi), metre gauge 2,874.23 kilometres (1,785.96 mi), total 5,449.29 kilometres (3,386.03 mi)
  - Track km: broad gauge 6,696.36 kilometres (4,160.93 mi), metre gauge 733.44 kilometres (455.74 mi), total 7,329.80 kilometres (4,554.53 mi)
  - Jaipur railway division
    - Route km: broad gauge 830.20 kilometres (515.86 mi), metre gauge 196.61 kilometres (122.17 mi), total 1,026.81 kilometres (638.03 mi)
    - Track km: broad gauge 1,385.13 kilometres (860.68 mi), metre gauge 213.53 kilometres (132.68 mi), total 1,598.66 kilometres (993.36 mi)

== List of railway stations and towns ==
The list includes the stations under the Jaipur railway division and their station category.

Category of station	No. of stations	Names of stations
A-1	1	Jaipur
A	6	Alwar, Sikar, Gandhinagar Jaipur, Bandikui Junction, Phulera, Rewari
B	-	-
C suburban station	-	-
D	-	-
E	-	-
F halt station	-	-
Total	-	-

Stations closed for Passengers -
