= Merta Road–Rewari line =

Railway line in India

Merta Road–Rewari line with Ratangarh, Merta City, Parbatsar and Jaipur–Churu branch lines

Overview
- Status: Operational
- Owner: Indian Railways
- Locale: Rajasthan and Haryana
- Termini: Merta Road Junction; Rewari Junction

Service
- Operator: North Western Railway

History
- Opened: 1 March 1941 (Main line); 18 January 1905 (Ratangarh branch); 1957 (Jaipur Churu branch); 18 January 1905 (Merta City branch); 1 August 1928 (Parbatsar branch)

Technical
- Line length: Main line 368 km (229 mi); Branch Lines: Degana–Ratangarh 153 km (95 mi); Jaipur–Churu 201 km (125 mi); Merta Road–Merta City 15 km (9 mi); Makrana–Parbatsar City 22 km (14 mi)
- Track gauge: 1,676 mm (5 ft 6 in) Broad Gauge
- Old gauge: 1,000 mm (3 ft 3 3/8 in) Metre gauge
- Electrification: Yes
- Operating speed: 100 km/h

The Merta Road–Rewari line or Merta Road–Phulera–Rewari line is a railway route on the North Western Railway zone of Indian Railways. This route plays an important role in rail transportation of Bikaner division, Ajmer division and Jaipur division of Rajasthan state and Gurugram division of Haryana state.

The corridor passes through the Desert Area of Rajasthan and Haryana with a stretch of 368 km with consists of four branch lines. The first branch line starts at Degana Junction and ends at Ratangarh Junction with a stretch of 153 km. The second branch line starts at Jaipur Junction, passes through Ringas Junction, and ends at Churu Junction with a stretch of 201 km. The third branch line starts at Merta Road Junction and ends at Merta City with a length of 15 km. The fourth branch line starts from Makrana Junction to Parbatsar City with a length of 22 km.

== History ==
The main railway line from Merta Road Junction to Rewari Junction was originally built by Jodhpur–Bikaner Railway and Jaipur State Railway company of Bikaner Princely State, Jodhpur Princely State and Jaipur Princely State portion as metre-gauge line during the 19th and 20th century. This line was opened in different phases during the construction period.

- The first phase, from Merta Road to Kuchaman City was opened on 13 March 1893.
- The second phase, from Kuchaman City to Phulera Junction which also called as Sambhar Salt Lake Branch line was opened on 20 December 1879.
- The third phase, from Phulera Junction to Narnaul was opened on 18 May 1905.
- The fourth phase, from Narnaul to Rewari Junction was opened on 1 March 1941.

Whereas, the first branch line between Merta Road to Merta City was opened on 18 January 1905, and the second branch line between Degana Junction and Ratangarh Junction was built by the two companies in three sections such as Degana Junction to Marwar Frontier under the Jodhpur State Railway was opened on 16 September 1909 and under the Bikaner State Railway the two sections which are Marwar Frontier to Sujangarh section was also opened on 16 September 1909 whereas the Sujangarh to Ratangarh Junction section was opened on 2 February 1910. Later the third branch line between Makrana and Parbatsar City was opened on 1 August 1928, and thereafter fourth branch line from Jaipur to Churu Junction which comes under the Jaipur State Railway section was opened in different phases during the construction period.

- The first phase, from Jaipur Junction to Ringas Junction was opened on 19 December 1916.
- The second phase, from Ringas Junction to Palsana was opened on 6 April 1918.
- The third phase, from Palsana to Sikar Junction was opened on 1 December 1922.
- The fourth phase, from Sikar Junction to Fatehpur Shekhawati was opened in 1943.
- The fifth phase, from Fatehpur Shekhawati to Churu Junction was opened in 1957.

After that, the conversion into 5 ft 6 in (1,676 mm) broad gauge was started in 1992-93 through into different section starting from the first section between Merta Road Junction to Phulera Junction was completed and opened in 1996, later the second section between Phulera Junction and Rewari Junction which is also called as Phulera–Rewari chord section line was opened on 15 January 2009.

Whereas, the Merta Road Junction–Merta City branch line was converted into 5 ft 6 in (1,676 mm) broad gauge and opened on 24 October 1994 with inaugurating the first Railbus in India as well as Asia also by Former Minister Nathuram Mirdha showing the green flag. and the Makrana Junction–Parbatsar City branch line was also converted to 5 ft 6 in (1,676 mm) broad gauge and opened on 1 June 2016. on the other side the Degana Junction–Ratangarh Junction branch line was also opened on 25 June 2010, and the Jaipur–Churu branch line was closed on 15 November 2015 for conversion into 5 ft 6 in (1,676 mm) broad gauge in different phases and reverse way.

- The first phase, from Churu Junction to Sikar Junction was opened on 9 December 2017.
- The second phase, from Sikar Junction to Ringas Junction was opened on 27 January 2019.
- The third phase, from Ringas Junction to Jaipur Junction was opened on 21 October 2019.

== Electrification ==
Electrification was started on 15 March 2016, on the first main line section between Phulera and Rewari which was completed in 2018. The Ringas Jaipur branch line section, which was approved on Rail Budget 2016-17, was also electrified in March 2021. whereas the remaining sections of this route is fully electrified.

== Trains passing through this line ==
=== Main ===
- Malani Express
- Bilaspur–Bikaner Express
- Bikaner–Puri Express
- Anuvrat AC Superfast Express
- Barmer–Guwahati Express
- Bikaner–Guwahati Express
- Ranthambore Express
- Leelan Express
- Pratap Express
- Bhopal–Jodhpur Passenger
- Marudhar Express (via Faizabad)
- Marudhar Express (via Sultanpur)
- Marudhar Express (via Pratapgarh)
- Mandore Express
- Puri–Jodhpur Express
- Rajasthan Sampark Kranti Express
- Howrah–Jodhpur Express
- Jaipur–Jodhpur Intercity Express
- Visakhapatnam–Bhagat Ki Kothi Express
- Bhagat Ki Kothi–Mannargudi Weekly Express
- Indore–Bikaner Mahamana Express
- Chandigarh–Bandra Terminus Superfast Express
- Chetak Express
- Ajmer–Delhi Sarai Rohilla Jan Shatabdi Express

=== Branch ===
- Amrapur Aravali Express
- Sainik Express
- Kota–Hisar Express
- Salasar Express
- Bhagat Ki Kothi–Kamakhya Express
- Jodhpur–Delhi Sarai Rohilla Superfast Express
- Bandra Terminus–Jammu Tawi Vivek Express
