= Marudhar Express (via Sultanpur) =

Overview
- Service type: Express
- Current operator: North Western Railway zone

Route
- Termini: Jodhpur Junction (JU); Varanasi Junction (BSB)
- Stops: 39
- Distance travelled: 1,159 km (720 mi)
- Average journey time: 24h 20m
- Service frequency: Thrice (Note: Runs three days in a week for every direction.)
- Train number: 14863/14864

On-board services
- Classes: AC II Tier, AC III Tier, Sleeper class, General Unreserved
- Seating arrangements: No
- Sleeping arrangements: Yes
- Catering facilities: On-board catering E-catering
- Observation facilities: ICF coach
- Entertainment facilities: No
- Baggage facilities: No
- Other facilities: Below the seats

Technical
- Rolling stock: 2
- Track gauge: 1,676 mm (5 ft 6 in)
- Operating speed: 50 km/h (31 mph), including halts

The Marudhar Express is an Express train belonging to North Western Railway zone that runs between Jodhpur Junction and Varanasi Junction in India. It is currently being operated with 14863/14864 train numbers on thrice in a week basis.

== Service ==
The 14864/Marudhar Express has an average speed of 52 km/h and covers 1167 km in 22 hours 25 mins. 14863/Marudhar Express has an average speed of 49 km/h and covers 2708 km in 23 hours 35 mins.

== Route and halts ==
The important halts of the train are:

- Varanasi Junction
- Babatpur
- Jaunpur City
- Nihalgarh
- Lucknow Charbagh
- Unnao Junction
- Kanpur Central
- Etawah Junction
- Shikohabad Junction
- Tundla Junction
- Agra Fort
- Idgah
- Achhnera Junction
- Bharatpur Junction
- Nadbai
- Kherli
- Mandawar
- Bandikui Junction
- Dausa
- Gandhinagar Jaipur
- Jaipur Junction
- Phulera Junction
- Sambhar Lake Town
- Makrana Junction
- Degana Junction
- Merta Road Junction
- Gotan
- Jodhpur Junction

== Coach composition ==
The train has standard ICF rakes with max speed of 110 kmph. The train consists of 21 coaches:

- 2 AC II Tier
- 3 AC III Tier
- 11 Sleeper coaches
- 5 General
- 2 Generators cum Luggage/parcel van

== Traction ==
Both trains are hauled by a Bhagat Ki Kothi Loco Shed-based WDP-4 locomotive hauls the train from Jodhpur up to Agra handing over to a Ghaziabad Loco Shed-based WAP-4 or WAP-7 locomotive powers the train for the remainder of the journey and vice versa.

== Rake sharing ==
The train shares its rake with:

- 14854/14853 Marudhar Express
- 14865/14866 Marudhar Express (via Pratapgarh)

== See also ==
- Varanasi Junction railway station
- Jodhpur Junction railway station
- Marudhar Express
- Marudhar Express (via Pratapgarh)
