= Delhi Sarai Rohilla–Bikaner Rajasthan Sampark Kranti Express =

Rajasthan Sampark Kranti Express
Overview
- Service type: Sampark Kranti Express
- Current operator: North Western Railway zone

Route
- Termini: Delhi Sarai Rohilla (DEE); Bikaner Junction (BKN)
- Stops: 8
- Distance travelled: 684 km (425 mi)
- Average journey time: 12h 5m
- Service frequency: Tri-weekly (Note: Runs three day in a week for every direction.)
- Train number: 22463/22464

On-board services
- Classes: AC 2 tier, AC 3 tier, Sleeper Class, General Unreserved
- Seating arrangements: No
- Sleeping arrangements: Yes
- Catering facilities: On-board Catering; E-Catering
- Observation facilities: ICF coach
- Entertainment facilities: No
- Baggage facilities: No
- Other facilities: Below the seats

Technical
- Rolling stock: 2
- Track gauge: 1,676 mm (5 ft 6 in)
- Operating speed: 57 km/h (35 mph), including halts

The Rajasthan Sampark Kranti Express is a Superfast train belonging to North Western Railway zone that runs between Delhi Sarai Rohilla and Bikaner Junction in India. It is currently being operated with 22463/22464 train numbers on tri-weekly basis.

== Service ==
The 22463/Rajasthan Sampark Kranti Express has an average speed of 57 km/h and covers 684 km in 12h 5m. The 22464/Rajasthan Sampark Kranti Express has an average speed of 58 km/h and covers 684 km in 12h 30m.

== Route and halts ==
The important halts of the train are:

- Delhi Sarai Rohilla
- Alwar Junction
- Jaipur Junction
- Makrana Junction
- Degana Junction
- Merta Road Bypass
- Nagaur
- Nokha
- Deshnoke
- Bikaner Junction

== Coach composite ==
The train has standard LHB rakes with a maximum speed of 130 km/h. The train consists of 19 coaches :

- 1 AC II Tier
- 5 AC III Tier
- 7 Sleeper Coaches
- 5 General Unreserved
- 2 Seating cum Luggage Rake

== Traction ==
Both trains are hauled by an Ghaziabad Loco Shed based WAP 7 or WAP 5 electric locomotive from Bikaner to Delhi and vice versa.

== Rake sharing ==
The train is attached with 12463/12464 Rajasthan Sampark Kranti Express at Merta Road Junction.

== Direction reversal ==
Train Reverses its direction 0 times.

== See also ==
- Delhi Sarai Rohilla railway station
- Bikaner Junction railway station
- Rajasthan Sampark Kranti Express
