= Mumbai CSMT–Howrah Duronto Express =

Train in India

Mumbai CSMT - Howrah Junction AC Duronto Express
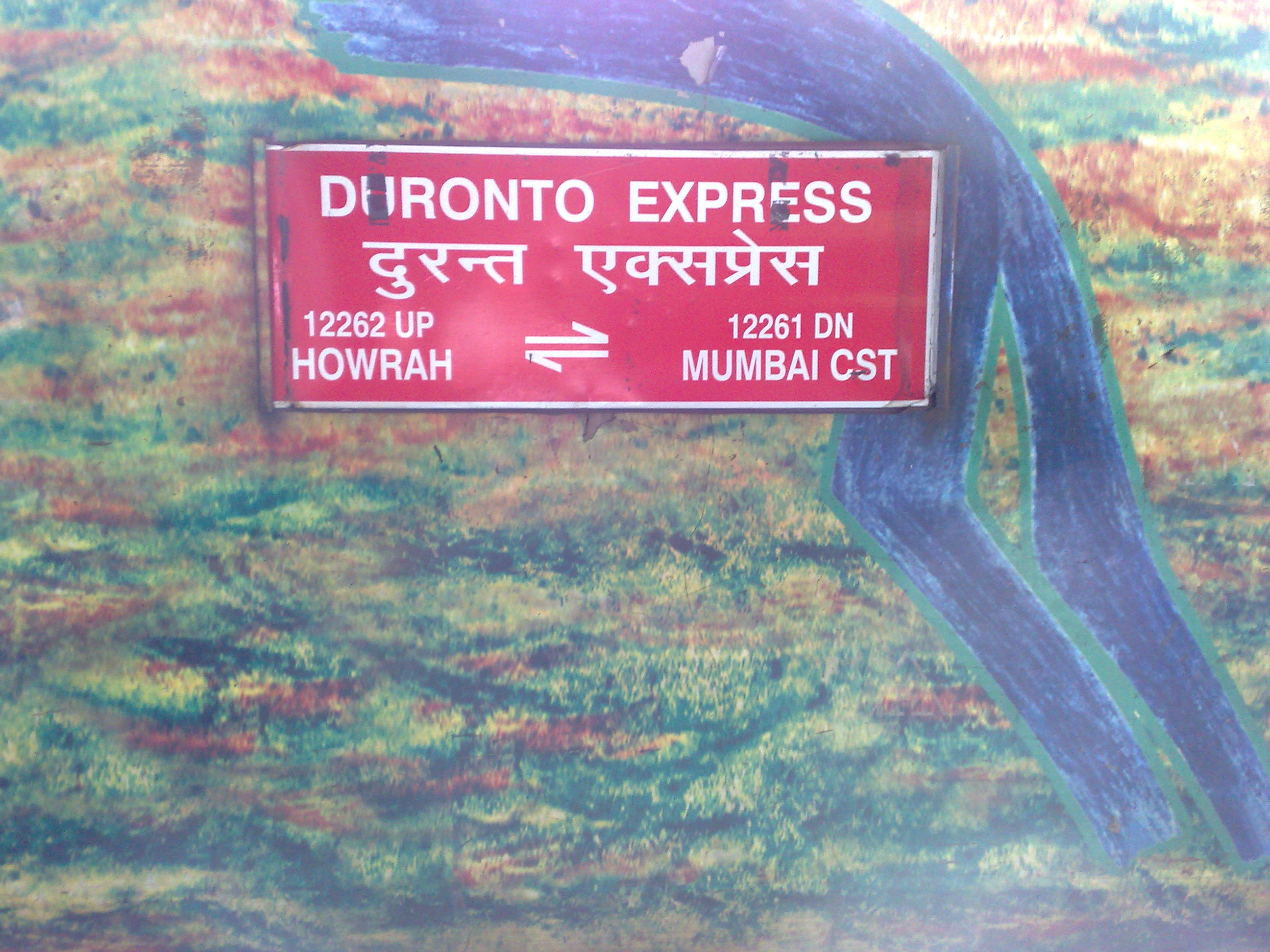

Overview
- Service type: Duronto Express
- Locale: Maharashtra, Chhattisgarh, Odisha, Jharkhand & West Bengal
- First service: 29 September 2009; 16 years ago
- Current operator: South Eastern Railway

Route
- Termini: Mumbai CSMT (CSMT); Howrah Junction (HWH)
- Distance travelled: 1,968 km (1,223 mi)
- Average journey time: 26 hours 35 minutes
- Service frequency: 4 days a week
- Train number: 12261 / 12262

On-board services
- Classes: AC First Class, AC 2 Tier, AC 3 Tier
- Seating arrangements: No
- Sleeping arrangements: Yes
- Catering facilities: Available
- Observation facilities: Large windows
- Baggage facilities: Available
- Other facilities: Below the seats

Technical
- Rolling stock: LHB coach
- Operating speed: 74 km/h (46 mph) average including halts.

The 12261 / 12262 Mumbai CSMT–Howrah Duronto Express is a Superfast Express train which belongs to South Eastern Railway zone that runs between Mumbai CSMT of Maharashtra and Howrah Junction of West Bengal in India.

== Background ==
Being the non-stop version of the Duronto train, it used to take the fewest intermediate stops for operational and technical purposes such as crew change, locomotive change, food pick-up, and water-filling. Later, most of operational (technical) stops were made commercial stops and stoppages are given in some state capitals while some state capitals are still non - stopping places.

== Rake sharing ==
Rake sharing is done with Pune-Howrah Duronto Express (12222/12221), Howrah-SMVT Bengaluru AC Superfast Express (22863/22864), Santragachi-Chennai Central AC Express (22807/22808), with a total of five Rakes primarily maintained at Santragachi Coaching Depot.

== Coach composition ==
Loco	1	2	3	4	5	6	7	8	9	10	11	12	13	14	15	16	17	18	19
	EOG	A3	A2	A1	H1	PC	B12	B11	B10	B9	B8	B7	B6	B5	B4	B3	B2	B1	EOG

12262 is the reverse composition of the above 12261.

B- Three Tier AC Sleeper/Third AC, A- Two Tier AC Sleeper/Second AC, H- AC First class cabins/First AC, PC-Pantry/Hot buffet car, EOG/GV-Generator van cum Guard van

== Locomotive ==
It previously ran with WAP-4 loco of Howrah but now mostly gets WAP-7 loco of Santragachi. Before the conversion of Mumbai CSMT to Kasara from 1500 V DC to 25 kV AC, it was hauled by WCAM-3 of KYN shed for that section.

== Speed ==
All its coaches are air conditioned LHB coach, capable of reaching 160 kmph. There is some confusing because according to Indian Railways Permanent Way Manual (IRPWM) on the Indian Railways website or Indian Railway Institute of Civil Engineering website, the BG (Broad Gauge) lines have been classified into six groups ‘A’ to ‘E’ on the basis of the future maximum permissible speeds but it may not be same as current speed.

The maximum permissible speed is 130 km/h but it is less in some parts of the journey as these parts are not fit for 130 km/h speed. The maximum permissible speed is 105 km/h between Mumbai CSMT and Kasara where increasing up to 110 kmph in future is planned, 60 km/h between Kasara and Igatpuri, either speed will be increased to 130 km/h from 110 kmph very soon or speed has already been increased recently like which has done for some trains earlier on Igatpuri - Nashik - Bhusaval - Akola - Badnera route. 130 km/h on Badnera - Wardha route, 130 kmph between Wardha and Nagpur, 130 km/h in Nagpur - Durg route, 110 km/h in Durg - Jharsuguda which is a part of Nagpur - Jharsuguda route but the speed in this part is under process to be increased to 130 kmph, 130 km/h in Jharsuguda - Tatanagar - Kharagpur - Andul route, 110 km/h between Andul and Howrah which is a part of Kharagpur - Howrah route.

== Time table ==
From Chhatrapati Shivaji Maharaj Terminus to Howrah - 12261. The train starts from Chhatrapati Shivaji Maharaj Terminus every Sunday, Tuesday, Wednesday & Thursday.

Station code	Station name	Arrival	Departure
CSMT	Chhatrapati Shivaji Maharaj Terminus	---	17:15
KYN	Kalyan Junction	17:59	18:01
KSRA	Kasara	19:07	19:10
IGP	Igatpuri	19:38	19:40
BSL	Bhusaval Junction	23:00	23:05
AK	Akola Junction	00:38	00:40
NGP	Nagpur Junction	04:10	04:15
R	Raipur Junction	08:22	08:24
BSP	Bilaspur Junction	09:55	10:05
TATA	Tatanagar Junction	16:10	16:20
HWH	Howrah Junction	20:15	---

From Howrah to Chhatrapati Shivaji Maharaj Terminus - 12262. The train starts from Howrah Junction every Monday, Tuesday, Wednesday & Friday.

Station code	Station name	Arrival	Departure
HWH	Howrah Junction	---	05:45
TATA	Tatanagar Junction	08:48	08:58
BSP	Bilaspur Junction	14:55	15:05
R	Raipur Junction	16:35	16:37
NGP	Nagpur Junction	20:50	20:55
AK	Akola Junction	23:53	23:55
BSL	Bhusaval Junction	01:45	01:50
IGP	Igatpuri	05:42	05:45
KYN	Kalyan Junction	07:00	07:02
CSMT	Chhatrapati Shivaji Maharaj Terminus	08:15	---

== Technical (operational) halts ==
12261 takes 1 technical halt at Kasara, Igatpuri. It takes about 7 mins at Kasara for addition of banker engine WAG-7 for the run through the ghats, which is removed at Igatpuri.

12262 has technical halt at Igatpuri if situation is normal and no halt at Kasara.

== Accidents and incidents ==
On July 30, 2024, the Howrah-Mumbai Express train derailed near Chakradharpur in Jharkhand's Chakradharpur division, resulting in a tragic accident around 3:43 am. Eighteen coaches were affected, including 16 passenger coaches, one power car, and one pantry car. This severe incident led to the deaths of two individuals and injuries to 20 others. Initial findings suggest a collision with a derailed goods train as the cause.
