= Marudhar Express (via Pratapgarh) =

Overview
- Service type: Express
- Current operator: North Western Railway zone

Route
- Termini: Jodhpur Junction (JU); Varanasi Junction (BSB)
- Stops: 30
- Distance travelled: 1,178 km (732 mi)
- Average journey time: 24h 20m
- Service frequency: Weekly (Note: Runs one time each direction in a week.)
- Train number: 14865/14866

On-board services
- Classes: AC II Tier, AC III Tier, Sleeper class, General Unreserved
- Seating arrangements: No
- Sleeping arrangements: Yes
- Catering facilities: On-board catering E-catering
- Observation facilities: ICF coach
- Entertainment facilities: No
- Baggage facilities: No
- Other facilities: Below the seats

Technical
- Rolling stock: 2
- Track gauge: 1,676 mm (5 ft 6 in)
- Operating speed: 50 km/h (31 mph), including halts

The Marudhar Express is an Express train belonging to North Western Railway zone that runs between Jodhpur Junction and Varanasi Junction in India. It is currently being operated with 14865/14866 train numbers on a weekly basis.

== Service ==
The 14866/Marudhar Express has an average speed of 49 km/h and covers 1,179 km in 23 hours 45 mins. 14865/Marudhar Express has an average speed of 50 km/h and covers 1,179 km in 23 hours 35 mins.

== Route and halts ==
The important halts of the train are:

- Varanasi Junction
- Bhadohi
- Janghai Junction
- Pratapgarh Junction
- Amethi
- Gauriganj
- Rae Bareli Junction
- Lucknow Charbagh
- Unnao Junction
- Kanpur Central
- Etawah Junction
- Shikohabad Junction
- Tundla Junction
- Agra Fort
- Idgah
- Achhnera Junction
- Bharatpur Junction
- Bandikui Junction
- Dausa
- Gandhinagar Jaipur
- Jaipur Junction
- Phulera Junction
- Sambhar Lake Town
- Makrana Junction
- Degana Junction
- Merta Road Junction
- Gotan
- Jodhpur Junction

== Coach composition ==
The train has standard ICF rakes with a maximum speed of 110 km/h. The train consists of 21 coaches:

- 2 AC II Tier
- 3 AC III Tier
- 11 Sleeper coaches
- 5 General
- 2 Generators cum Luggage/parcel van

== Traction ==
Both trains are hauled by a Bhagat Ki Kothi Loco Shed-based WDP-4 locomotive hauls the train from Jodhpur up to Agra, handing over to a Ghaziabad Loco Shed-based WAP-4 or WAP-7 locomotive until Lucknow following which a Lucknow Loco Shed-based WDM-3A locomotive powers the train for the remainder of the journey and vice versa.

== Rake sharing ==
The train shares its rake with:

- 14854/14853 Marudhar Express
- 14863/14864 Marudhar Express (via Sultanpur)

== See also ==
- Varanasi Junction railway station
- Jodhpur Junction railway station
- Marudhar Express
- Marudhar Express (via Sultanpur)
