= Jogi Magra railway station =

Railway station in Rajasthan, India

Jogi Magra

General information
- Location: Jogi Magra, Nagaur district, Rajasthan; India
- Coordinates: 26.697862°N 73.818142°E
- Elevation: 335 metres (1,099 ft)
- System: Indian Railways station
- Owner: Indian Railways
- Operator: North Western Railway
- Line: Jodhpur–Bathinda line
- Platforms: 1
- Tracks: Double Electric-Line

Construction
- Structure type: Standard (on-ground station)

Other information
- Status: Functioning
- Station code: JOM
- Zone(s): North Western Railway
- Division(s): Jodhpur

Services
| Preceding station | Indian Railways | Following station |
|---|---|---|
| Gotan towards ? | North Western Railway zone Jodhpur–Bathinda line | Merta Road Junction towards ? |
Location
- Interactive map

Jogi Magra railway station is a railway station located on the Jodhpur–Bathinda railway line operated by the North Western Railway zone under Jodhpur railway division. It is situated at Jogi Magra in Nagaur district in the Indian state of Rajasthan.
