= Rajasthan Sampark Kranti Express =

Train in India

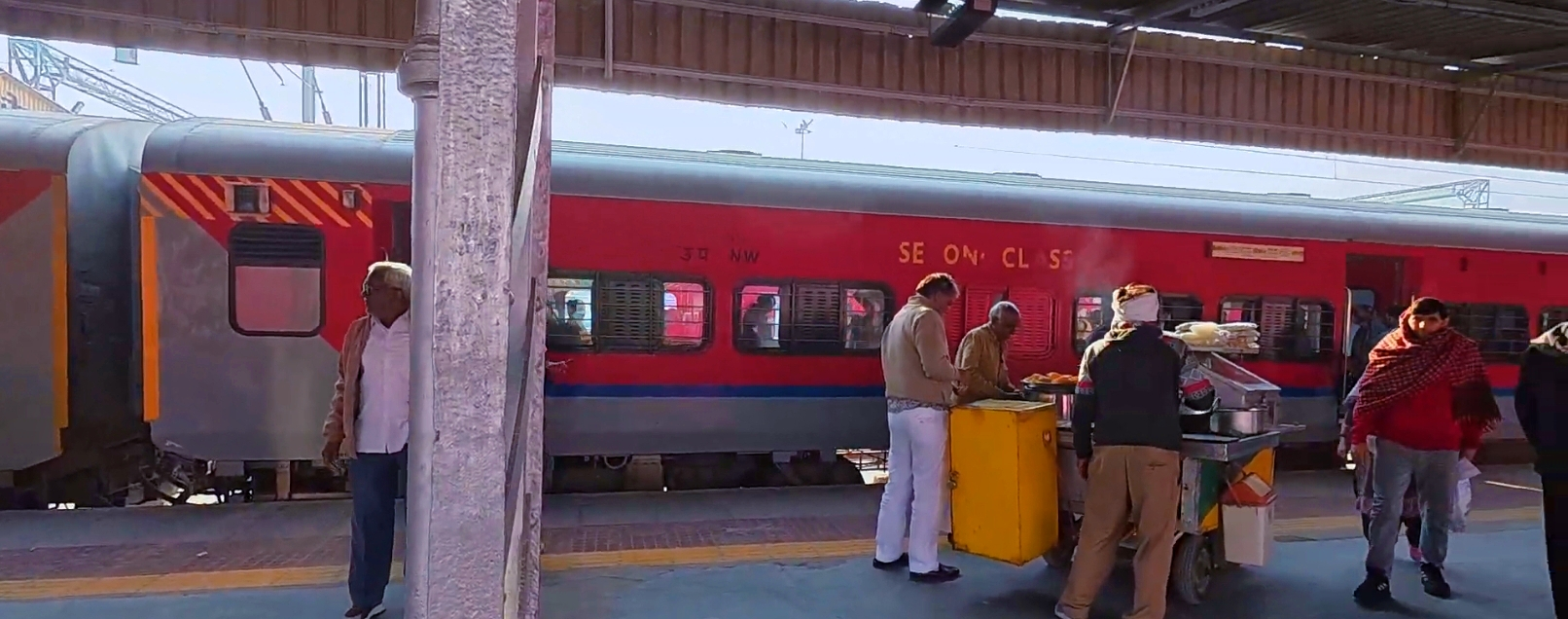
- Rajasthan Sampark Kranti Express Arrived At Rewari Junction railway station

Overview
- Service type: Sampark Kranti Express
- First service: 22 March 2005; 21 years ago
- Current operator: North Western Railway

Route
- Termini: Jodhpur (JU) and Bikaner Jn (BKN); Delhi Sarai Rohilla (DEE)
- Stops: 6
- Distance travelled: 616 km (383 mi)
- Average journey time: 10 hours
- Service frequency: Tri–weekly
- Train number: 12463 / 12464

On-board services
- Classes: AC First Class, AC 2 Tier, AC 3 Tier, Sleeper Class, General Unreserved
- Seating arrangements: Yes
- Sleeping arrangements: Yes
- Catering facilities: Available
- Observation facilities: Large windows
- Baggage facilities: Available
- Other facilities: Below the seats

Technical
- Rolling stock: LHB coach
- Track gauge: 1,676 mm (5 ft 6 in)
- Operating speed: 12464/63 (Jodhpur) average speed 64 kmph and 22464/63 (Bikaner) average speed 61 kmph.
Route map
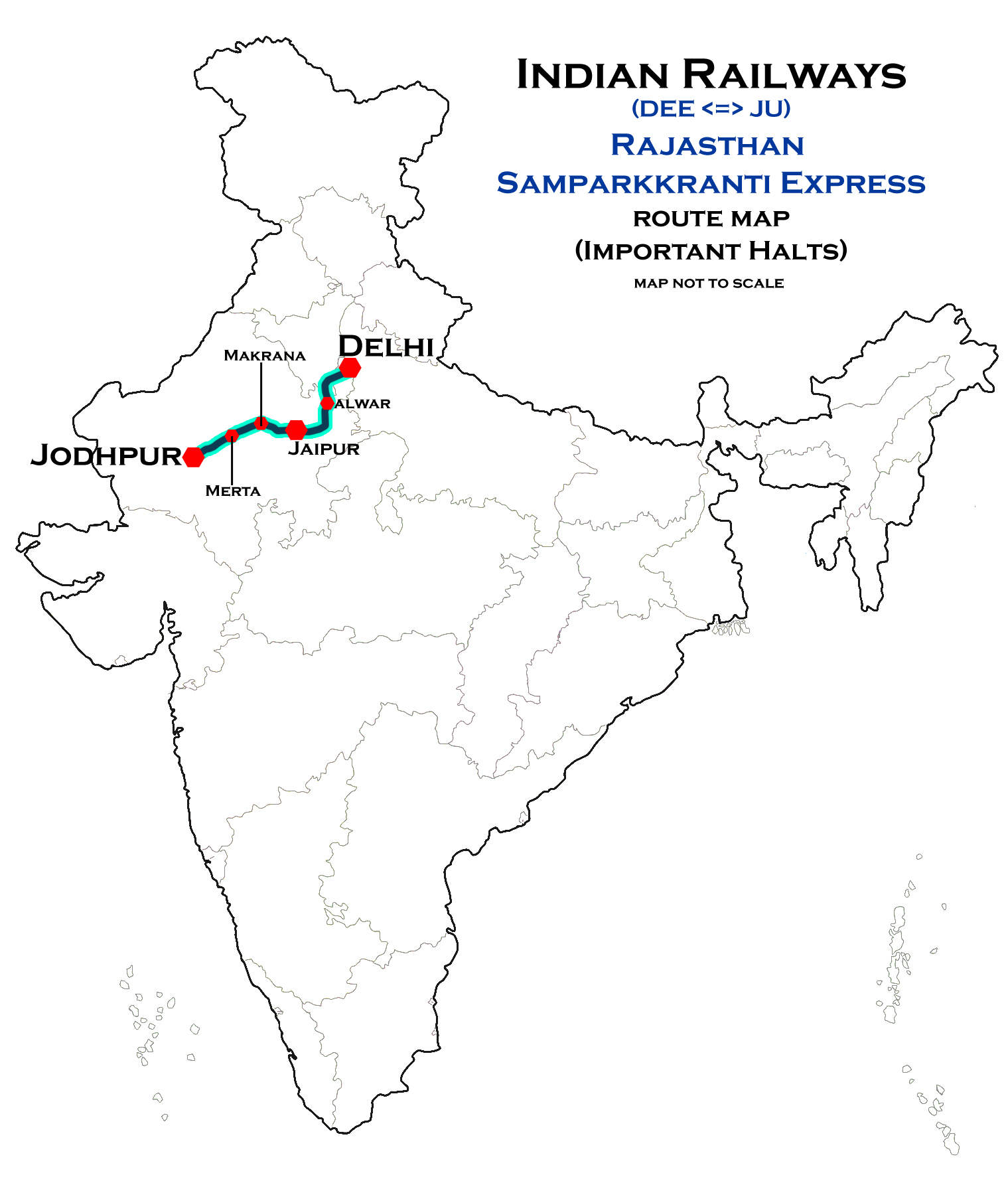

Rajasthan Sampark Kranti Express is a Superfast Express train of the Sampark Kranti Express series belonging to Indian Railways – North Western Railway zone that runs between Jodhpur/Bikaner to Delhi Sarai Rohilla in India. 12464/63 starts from Jodhpur and 22464/63 starts from Bikaner (BKN), serving the states of Delhi & Rajasthan. This train was introduced in the interim budget of 2004 / 05 by the then Railway Minister of India Mr. Nitish Kumar.

== Coaches ==
The 12464 / 12463 Rajasthan Sampark Kranti Express has 1 AC First Class cum AC 2 tier, 1 AC 2 tier, 1 AC 2 AC 3 tier, 3 Sleeper class, 3 General Unreserved & 2 EOG (Seating cum Luggage Rake) coaches. It does not carry a pantry car. In addition, nine coaches of the 22464 / 63 Delhi Sarai Rohilla–Bikaner Rajasthan Sampark Kranti Express are attached / detached from the 12464 / 63 Jodhpur–Delhi Sarai Rohilla Rajasthan Sampark Kranti Express at Merta Road Junction.

== Service ==
The 12464 Rajasthan Sampark Kranti Express covers the distance of 616 km (383 mi) in 10 hours 35 mins (58.20 km/h) and in 10 hours 00 mins as 12463 Rajasthan Sampark Kranti Express (61.60 km/h).

== Routeing ==
The 12464 / 12463 Rajasthan Sampark Kranti Express runs from Jodhpur Junction via Merta Road Junction, Degana Junction, Makrana Junction, Jaipur Junction, Alwar Junction, Delhi Cantt to Delhi Sarai Rohilla.

== Traction ==
Both trains are hauled by a Bhagat Ki Kothi Diesel Loco Shed-based WAP-7 electric locomotive on its entire journey.
