= Santragachi–Yelahanka AC Express =

Train in India

Overview
- Service type: AC Express
- Status: Active
- Locale: West Bengal, Odisha, Andhra Pradesh and Karnataka
- First service: 10 July 2025; 9 months ago (Inaugural); 2 April 2026; 35 days ago (Commercial)
- Current operator: South Eastern Railways (SER)

Route
- Termini: Santragachi Junction (SRC); Yelahanka Junction (YNK)
- Stops: 28
- Distance travelled: 1,882 km (1,169 mi)
- Average journey time: 35 hrs 30 mins
- Service frequency: Weekly
- Train number: 18063/18064

On-board services
- Classes: Sleeper coach (SL); AC 1-tier (H1); AC 2-tier (A1); AC 3-tier (B1)
- Seating arrangements: No
- Sleeping arrangements: Yes
- Auto-rack arrangements: Upper
- Catering facilities: No
- Observation facilities: Large windows
- Entertainment facilities: No

Technical
- Rolling stock: ICF coach
- Track gauge: Indian gauge
- Electrification: 25 kV 50 Hz AC overhead line
- Operating speed: 53 km (33 mi)
- Track owner: Indian Railways
- Rake sharing: No
Route map
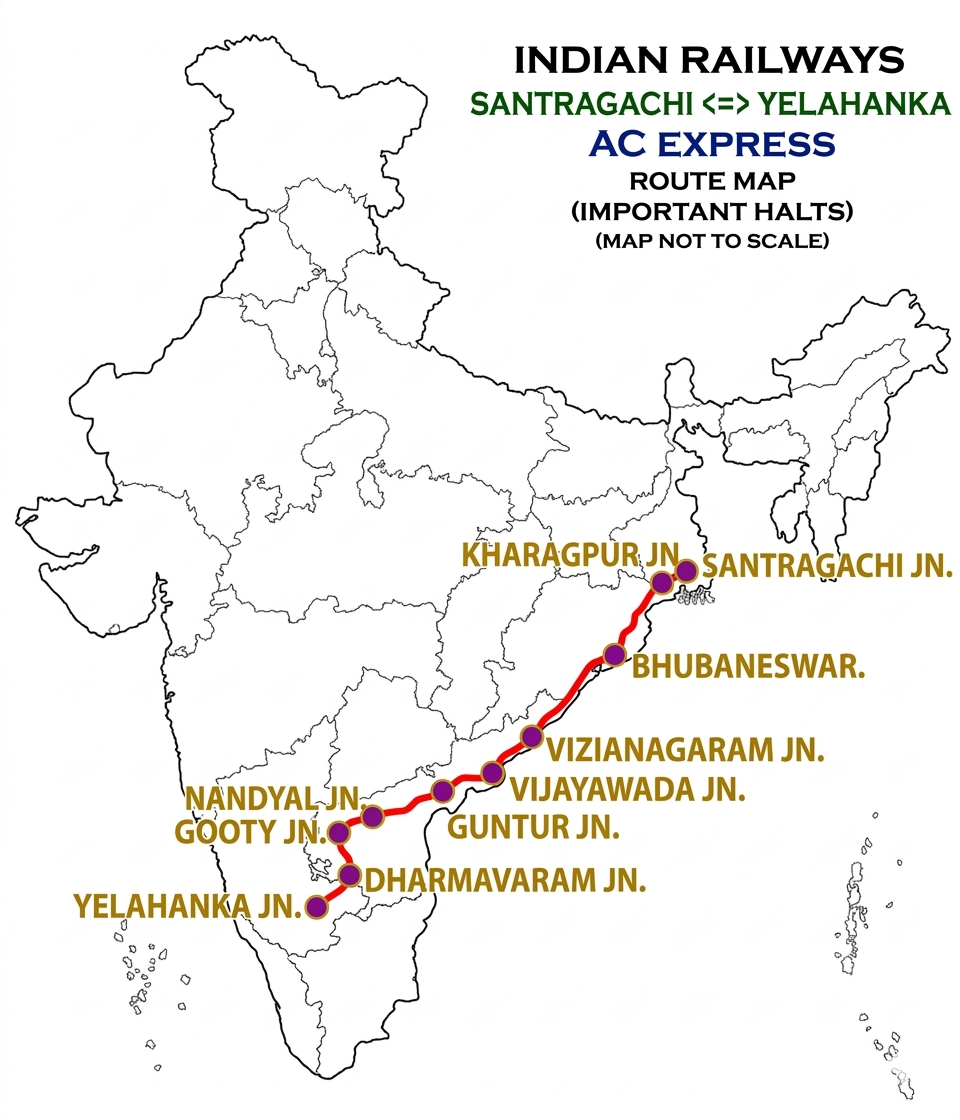

The 18063/18064 Santragachi–Yelahanka AC Express is India's 28th AC Express train of Indian Railways, which belongs to South Eastern Railway zone that runs between the city of Santragachi Junction of West Bengal and Yelahanka Junction of Karnataka in India.

The express train is inaugurated on 10 July 2025 by Honorable Prime Minister Narendra Modi through video conference.

== Overview ==
The train is operated by Indian Railways, connecting Santragachi Junction and Yelahanka Junction. It is currently operated 18063/18064 on weekly basis.

== Schedule ==
Train Schedule: Santragachi ↔ Yelahanka AC Express
Train No.	Station Code	Departure Station	Departure Time	Departure Day	Arrival Station	Arrival Hours
18063	SRC	Santragachi Junction	12:50 PM	Yelahanka Junction	12:20 AM	35h 30m
18064	YNK	Yelahanka Junction	04:50 AM	Santragachi Junction	05:00 PM	36h 10m

== Routes and halts ==
The Important Halts of the train are :

- Santragachi Junction
- Kharagpur Junction
- Balasore
- Bhadrak
- Cuttack Junction
- Bhubaneswar
- Khurda Road Junction
- Brahmapur
- Palasa
- Srikakulam Road
- Vizianagaram Junction
- Kottavalasa Junction
- Pendurthi
- Simhachalam
- Duvvada
- Rajahmundry
- Vijayawada Junction
- Guntur Junction
- Narasaraopet
- Markapur Road
- Giddalur
- Nandyal
- Dhone Junction
- Gooty Junction
- Anantapur
- Dharmavaram Junction
- Hindupur
- Yelahanka Junction

== Coach composition ==
1. Sleeper class – 6
2. AC 2nd Class – 2
3. AC 3rd Class – 6
4. AC 1st Class – 1

== Rake reversal or rake share ==
No rake reversal or rake share.

== See also ==
Trains from Santragachi Junction :

- Rupashi Bangla Express
- Santragachi–Chennai Central AC Express
- Hazur Sahib Nanded–Santragachi Express
- Santragachi–Anand Vihar Superfast Express
- Santragachi–Rani Kamalapati Humsafar Express

Trains from Yelahanka Junction :

- Prashanti Nilayam Express

== Notes ==
a. Runs a day in a week with both directions.
