= AC Express (Indian Railways) =

Type of train services by Indian Railways

AC (SuperFast) Express
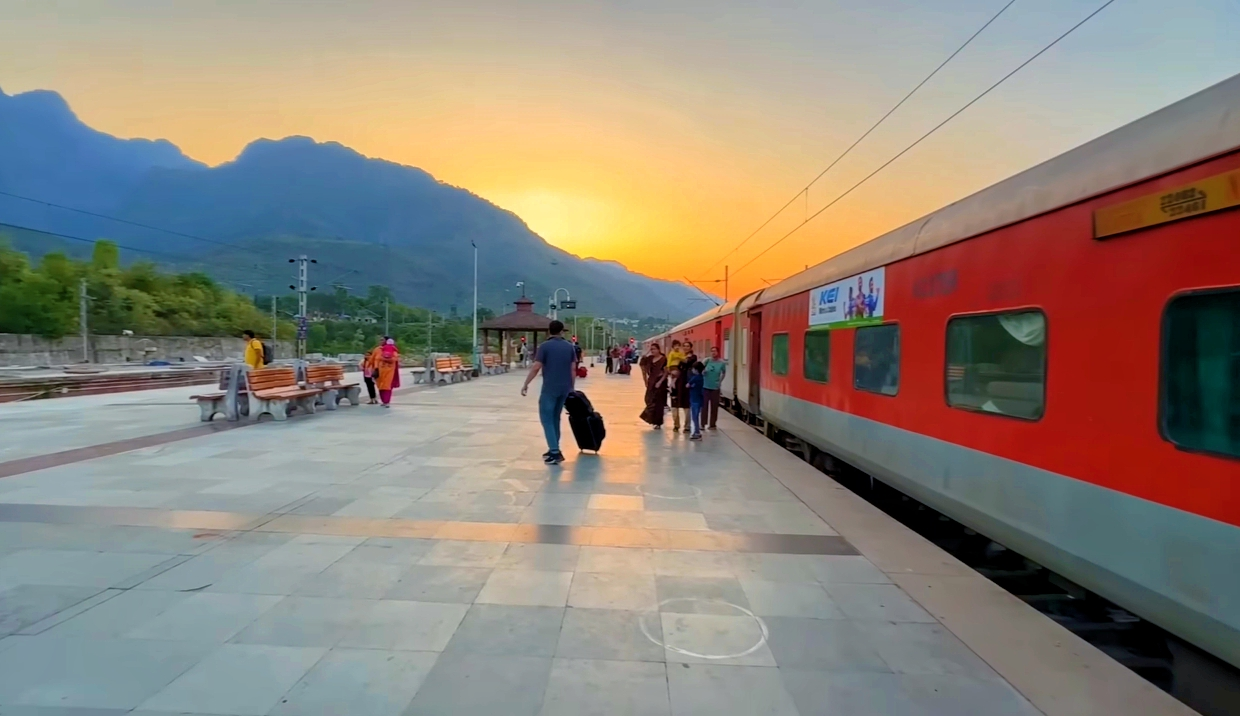
- Shri Shakti AC Express at SVD Katra

Overview
- Status: Active
- Predecessor: Deluxe Express
- First service: 1 July 2008 as Nanda Devi AC Express
- Current operator: Indian Railways

On-board services
- Classes: AC First Class, AC Two Tier, AC Three Tier, AC 3 Tier Economy
- Seating arrangements: Available
- Sleeping arrangements: Available
- Catering facilities: Pantry car available, no complimentary food
- Baggage facilities: Available

Technical
- Rolling stock: LHB coaches
- Operating speed: 110–130 km/h

Air Conditioned Express or AC Express is a series of superfast air-conditioned trains of Indian Railways that links major cities of India. These trains have the second highest priority within the Indian Railway network, after the premium trains of Indian Railways. There are 27 such AC Express operating in Indian Railways.

== History ==
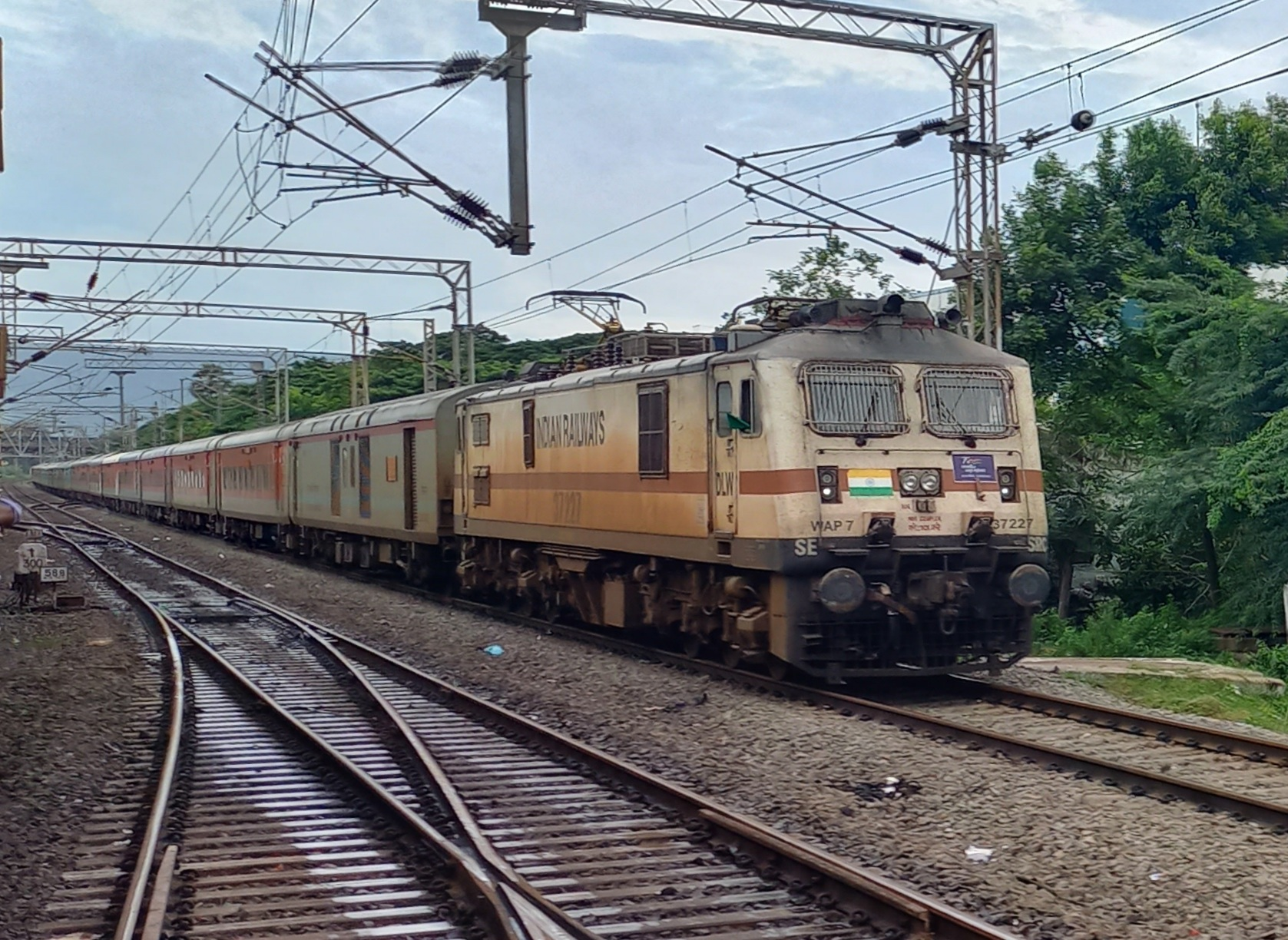
Santragachi - Chennai AC Express

The history of AC Express trains dates back to the Deluxe Express, which were the first air-conditioned trains of Indian Railways, connecting important cities across India. These were fully air-conditioned, had minimal stops, and operated at maximum speeds. The Howrah-bound Poorva Express and the Mumbai-bound Paschim Express were the first AC Express trains, originally known as the Deluxe AC Express. However, after the introduction of Rajdhani Express in 1969 and its subsequent fleet expansion, these trains lost their status as full air-conditioned trains.

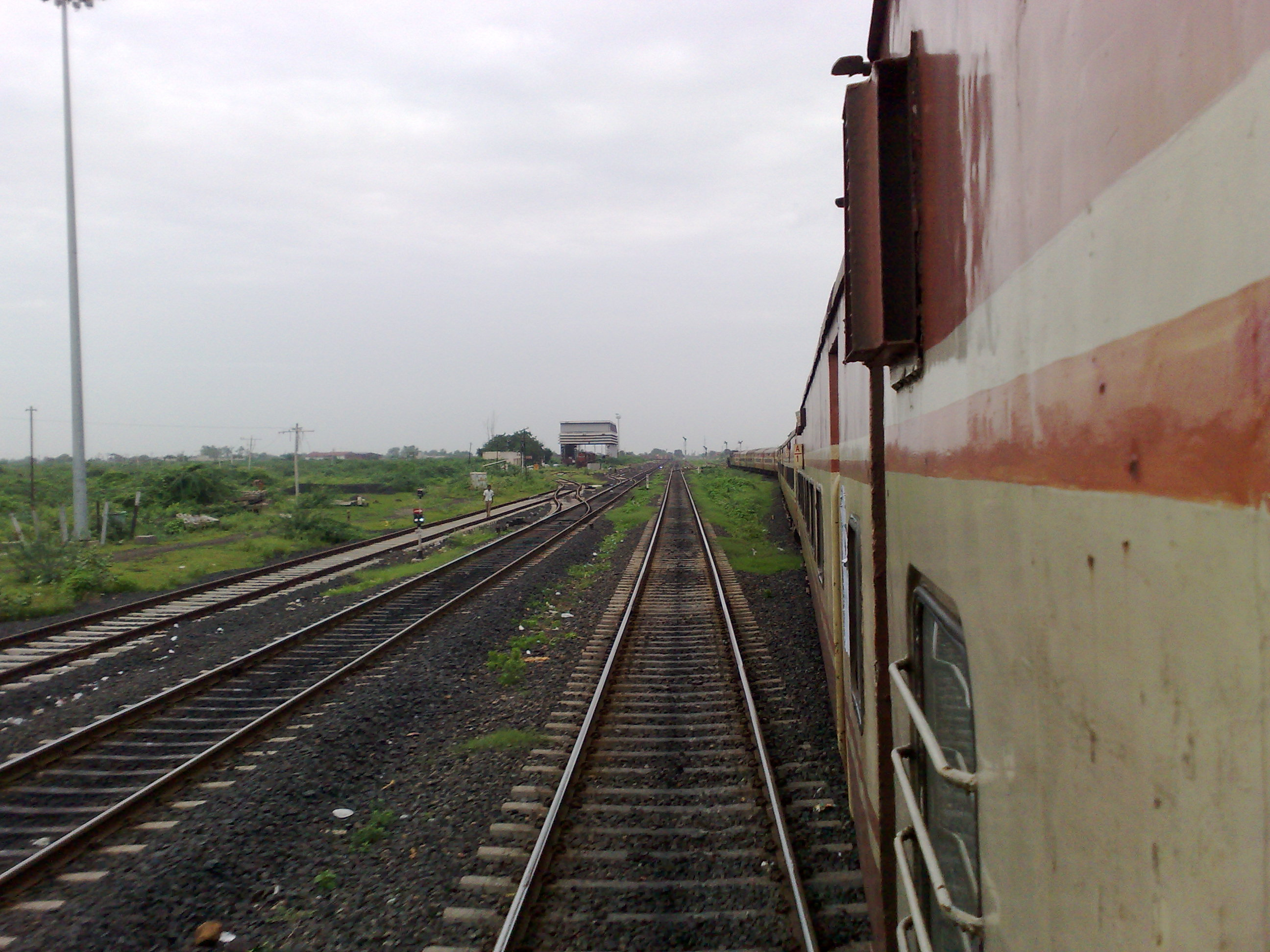
Bandra Terminus Bhuj AC Superfast Express in ICF coaches

The second type of AC Express was introduced in 1991. After the Mumbai Rajdhani was launched in 1972, there was a high demand for another pair of Rajdhani Express trains between Delhi and Mumbai. To meet this demand, on 1 July 1991, Indian Railways inaugurated the Bombay Central – New Delhi AC Express. This train ran the same route as the Bombay Rajdhani, had similar timings, and an extra 45 minutes of travel time to accommodate more passengers. On 1 January 1992, this train was formalized as the Bombay Central – H.Nizamuddin August Kranti Rajdhani Express.

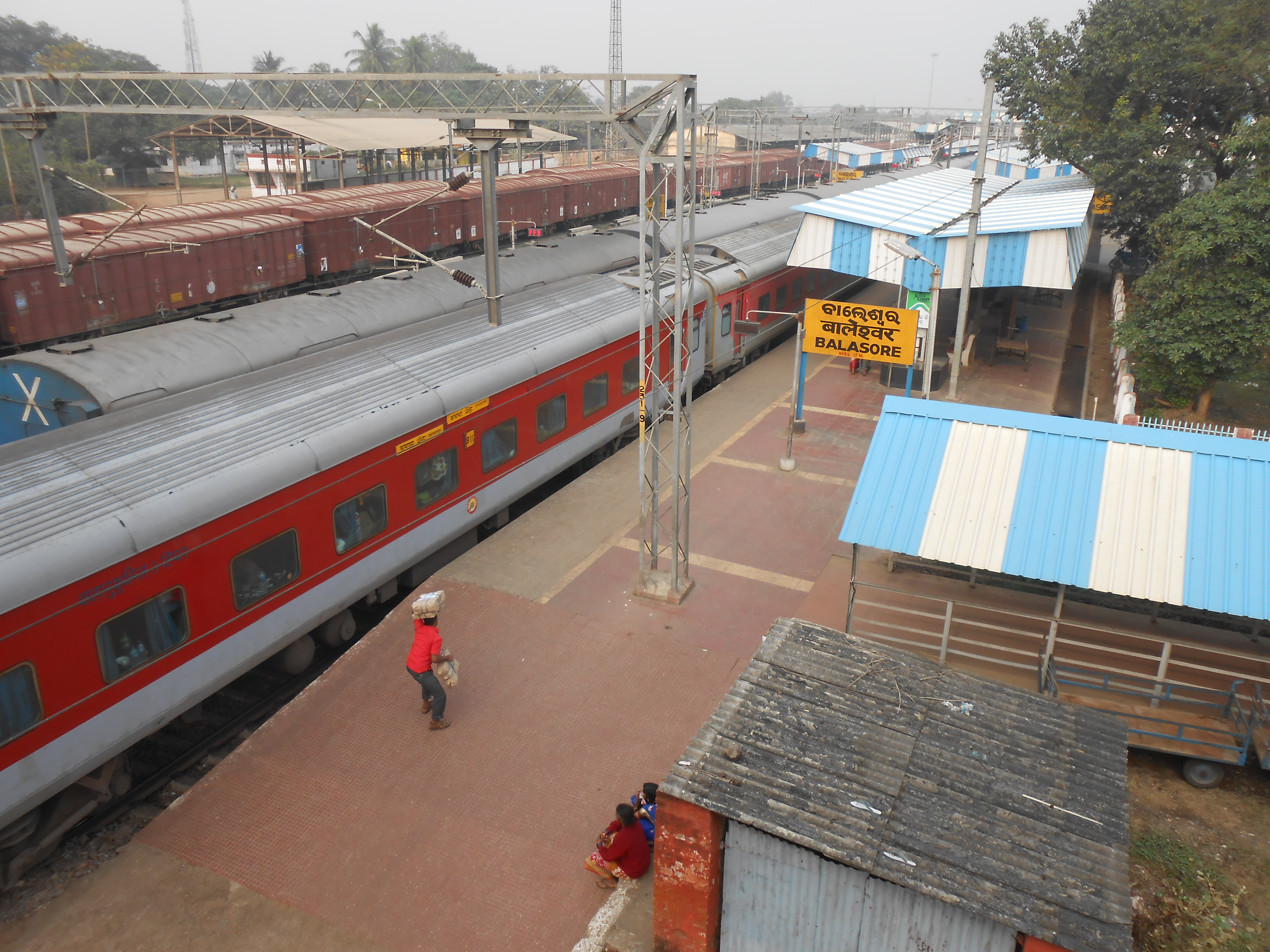
Yesvantapur - Kamakhya AC Express standing at Balasore Railway Station

The third and current type of AC Express was launched in 2008. The first of these was the Nanda Devi AC Superfast Express, which was inaugurated on 1 July 2008 initially between Dehradun and New Delhi Railway Station.

== Services ==
Unlike its predecessors which offered premium services like complimentary meals and butler services, newer AC Express trains were designed to cater to the middle and upper-middle class segments of society. These trains have limited stops and operate at speeds comparable to premium trains like the Rajdhani and Duronto. However, unlike premium trains, food and meals are not complimentary on these AC Express trains. Instead, pantry car services are available, similar to those on other general express and mail trains of Indian Railways.

Prior to the rapid conversion of the Indian Railway coaching stocks from ICF to LHB coaches, these trains used to operate using the old ICF coaches of Rajdhani Express. Earlier they were hauled by WDM-3D , WDM-3A , WDP-4 now all trains will runs by WAP-7

Currently, the following AC Express trains are operating in India.

Sr no.	Train no.	Name
1	12551/12552	Kamakhya–SMVT Bengaluru AC Superfast Express
2	14805/14806	Yesvantpur–Barmer AC Express
3	16561/16562	Yesvantpur–Thiruvananthapuram North AC Express
4	12171/12172	Lokmanya Tilak Terminus–Haridwar AC Superfast Express
5	12401/12402	Nanda Devi AC Express
6	12519/12520	Lokmanya Tilak Terminus–Agartala AC Express
7	12773/12774	Shalimar–Secunderabad AC Superfast Express
8	12783/12784	Visakhapatnam–Secunderabad AC Superfast Express
9	22115/22116	Lokmanya Tilak Terminus–Karmali AC Superfast Express
10	22117/22118	Pune–Amravati AC Superfast Express
11	22121/22122	Lokmanya Tilak Terminus–Lucknow AC Superfast Express
12	22123/22124	Pune–Ajni AC Superfast Express
13	22125/22126	Nagpur–Amritsar AC Superfast Express
14	22207/22208	Chennai Central–Thiruvananthapuram Central Super AC Superfast Express (only operational Super AC Express service in India)
15	22401/22402	Delhi Sarai Rohilla–MCTM Udhampur AC Superfast Express
16	22411/22412	Arunachal AC Superfast Express
17	22461/22462	Shri Shakti AC Express
18	22631/22632	Anuvrat AC Superfast Express
19	22475/22476	Hisar–Coimbatore AC Superfast Express
20	22807/22808	Santragachi–Chennai Central AC Express
21	22837/22838	Dharti Aaba AC Superfast Express
22	22863/22864	Howrah–SMVT Bengaluru AC Superfast Express
23	22903/22904	Bandra Terminus–Bhuj AC Superfast Express
24	12429/12430	Lucknow–New Delhi AC Superfast Express
25	15888/15887	Guwahati - Badarpur Tourist Express
26	21903/21904	Bandra Terminus - Bikaner AC Superfast Express
27	15889/15890	Muzaffarpur–Hadapsar (Pune) AC Express
28	18063/18064	Santragachi–Yelahanka AC Express
29	17053/17054	Charlapalli–Anakapalle AC Express

== Defunct services ==
- Howrah - New Jalpaiguri Yuva AC Express
- Chennai Central – Madurai AC Superfast Express was made Chennai Central – Bodinayakanur Superfast Express after 2021.
- Andhra Pradesh AC Express was made Andhra Pradesh Express after 2020.
- Hyderabad-Kakinada Cocanada AC Express was made Cocanada SF Express.

== See also ==
- Antyodaya Express
- Double Decker Express
- Duronto Express
- Garib Rath Express
- Gatimaan Express
- Humsafar Express
- Jan Sadharan Express
- Jan Shatabdi Express
- Kavi Guru Express
- Mahamana Express
- Mumbai–Ahmedabad high-speed rail corridor
- Rajdhani Express
- Rajya Rani Express
- Sampark Kranti Express
- Shatabdi Express
- Tejas Express
- Uday Express
- Vande Bharat Express
- Vivek Express
