= Shri Shakti AC Express =

Train in India

Shri Shakti AC Superfast Express

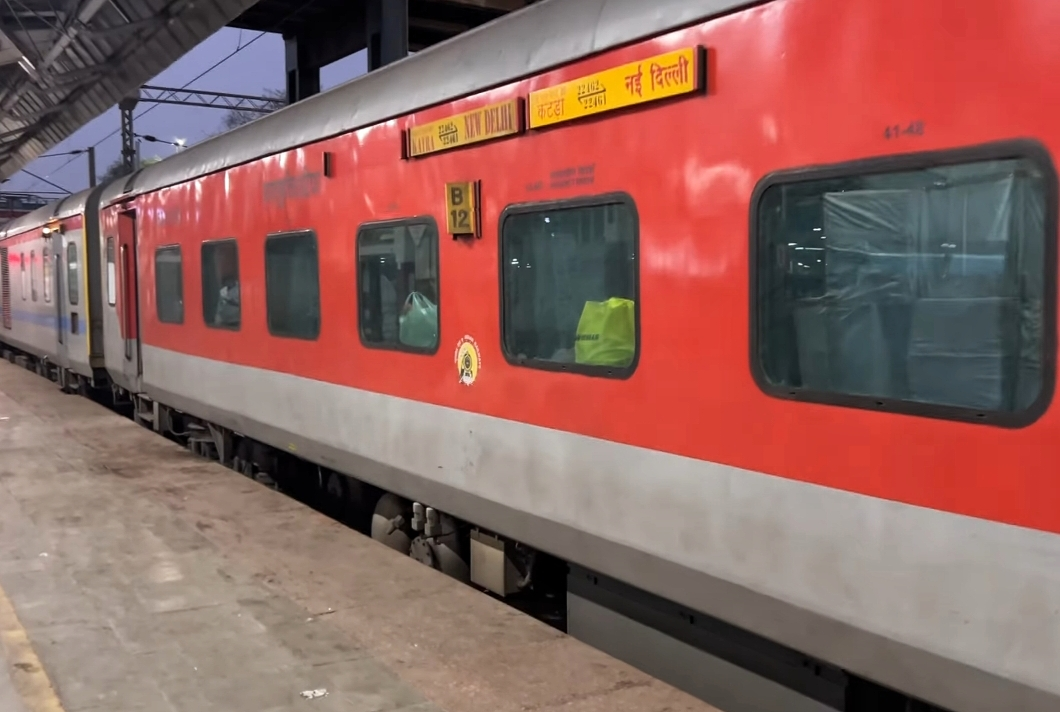
- Shri Shakti Express At Ambala Cantt Junction

Overview
- Service type: AC Superfast
- Locale: Jammu and Kashmir, Punjab, Haryana & Delhi
- First service: 14 July 2014; 12 years ago
- Current operator: Northern Railway

Route
- Termini: New Delhi (NDLS); SMVD Katra (SVDK)
- Stops: 6
- Distance travelled: 654 km (406 mi)
- Average journey time: 10 hours 45 minutes
- Service frequency: Daily
- Train number: 22461 / 22462

On-board services
- Classes: AC First Class, AC 2 Tier, AC 3 Tier
- Disabled access: Disabled access
- Seating arrangements: Yes
- Sleeping arrangements: Yes
- Catering facilities: Available
- Observation facilities: Large windows
- Baggage facilities: Available
- Other facilities: Below the seats

Technical
- Rolling stock: LHB coach
- Track gauge: 1,676 mm (5 ft 6 in)
- Operating speed: 130 km/h (81 mph) maximum, 63 km/h (39 mph) average including halts.

The 22461 / 22462 Shri Shakti AC Superfast Express is a AC Superfast train run by Indian Railways between New Delhi and Shri Mata Vaishno Devi Katra railway stations in India.

Indian Prime Minister Narendra Modi had on 4 July 2014 flagged off this train from Katra Vaishno Devi while commissioning the 25-km-long Udhampur-Katra line, built at an estimated cost of Rs 1,132.75 crore.

At the function, the Prime Minister had named the train Shri Shakti Express and said such services are planned from major cities in the country. The Vaishno Devi shrine attracts about 10 million pilgrims annually. The Train started its regular commercial operations from July 14, 2014.

The train connectivity to Katra is part of the ambitious Kashmir rail link project marking region's rail connectivity with the rest of the country. The train traverses through eight tunnels and 29 minor bridges en route Udhampur – Katra track.

== Train info ==
Train coaches	LHB rakes

Shri Shakti AC Superfast Express
Locomotive	Luggage Brake & Generator Car	AC 3 Tier											Pantry car / Catering	AC 2 Tier					AC First Class	Luggage Brake & Generator Car
LOCO	EoG	B11	B10	B9	B8	B7	B6	B5	B4	B3	B2	B1	PC	A5	A4	A3	A2	A1	H1	EoG

== Route ==
The 22461/22462 Shri Shakti Express is an AC Superfast Express run by Indian Railways between New Delhi and Shri Mata Vaishno Devi Katra railway stations in India.

Shri Shakti AC Express – 22461
#	Station	Code	Average speed (km/h)	Zone	Address
1	New Delhi	NDLS	100	NR	Ajmeri Gate 110002, Delhi NCT
2	Ambala Cantonment Junction	UMB	100	NR	Ambala 133001, Haryana
3	Ludhiana Junction	LDH	80	NR	Ludhiana 141001, Punjab
4	Jalandhar Cantonment	JRC	80	NR	Jalandhar – 144001, Punjab
5	Pathankot Junction	PTKC	60	NR	Pathankot Cantt. (Distt. Pathankot) 145001 Ph;0186-2251594, Punjab
6	Jammu Tawi	JAT	60	NR	Jammu 180002, Jammu and Kashmir
7	Udhampur	UHP	40	NR	Udhampur 182101, Jammu and Kashmir
8	Shri Mata Vaishno Devi Katra	SVDK	40	NR	Distt – Reasi (JK) Pin – 182320, Jammu and Kashmir

Shri Shakti AC Express – 22462
#	Station	Code	Average speed )km/h)	Zone	Address
1	Shri Mata Vaishno Devi Katra	SVDK	40	NR	Distt – Reasi (JK) Pin – 182320, Jammu and Kashmir
2	Udhampur	UHP	40	NR	Udhampur 182101, Jammu and Kashmir
3	Jammu Tawi	JAT	60	NR	Jammu 180002, Jammu and Kashmir
4	Pathankot Junction	JRC	80	NR	Jalandhar – 144001, Punjab
5	Jalandhar Cantonment	PTKC	60	NR	Pathankot Cantt. (Distt. Pathankot) 145001 Ph;0186-2251594, Punjab
6	Ludhiana Junction	LDH	80	NR	Ludhiana 141001, Punjab
7	Ambala Cantonment Junction	UMB	100	NR	Ambala 133001, Haryana
8	New Delhi	NDLS	100	NR	Ajmeri Gate 110002, Delhi NCT

== Traction ==
Both trains are hauled by a Ghaziabad Loco Shed-based WAP-7 electric locomotive from New Delhi to SMVD Katra and vice versa.
