= Lokmanya Tilak Terminus–Lucknow AC Superfast Express =

Mumbai Lokmanya Thilak Terminus - Lucknow Charbagh AC Superfast Express

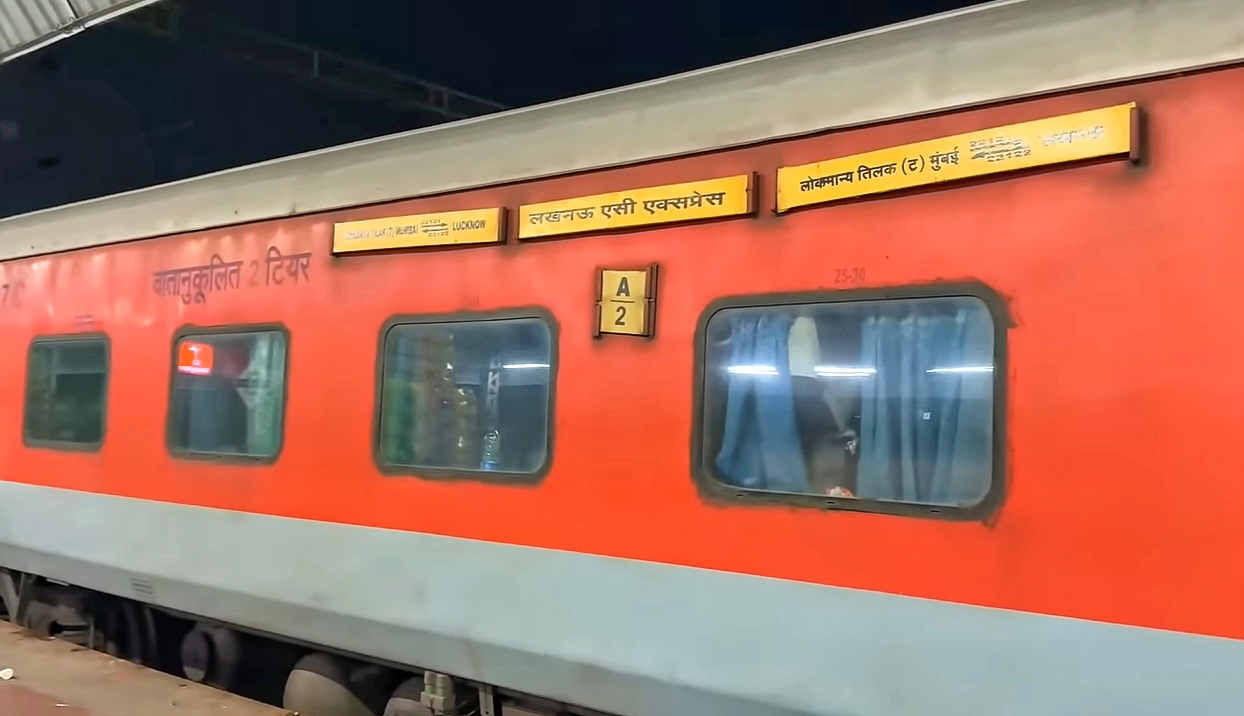
- Mumbai Lokmanya Tilak Terminus - Lucknow Charbagh AC Superfast Express At Itarsi Junction railway station

Overview
- Service type: AC Express
- First service: 8 April 2017; 9 years ago
- Current operator: Central Railways

Route
- Termini: Lokmanya Tilak Terminus; Lucknow Charbagh
- Stops: 9
- Distance travelled: 1,407 km (874 mi)
- Average journey time: 23h 40m as 22121 & 24h 5m as 22122
- Service frequency: 1 day a week (weekly)
- Train number: 22121 / 22122

On-board services
- Classes: AC 1st Class, AC 2 Tier, AC 3 Tier
- Seating arrangements: No
- Sleeping arrangements: Yes
- Auto-rack arrangements: No
- Catering facilities: Yes
- Baggage facilities: Storage space under berth

Technical
- Rolling stock: LHB coach
- Track gauge: 1,676 mm (5 ft 6 in)
- Electrification: Yes
- Operating speed: 130 km/h (81 mph) maximum, 59 km/h (37 mph), including halts

The 22121/22122 Lokmanya Tilak Terminus–Lucknow AC Superfast Express (abbreviated as LTT–Lucknow AC SF Express) is a Superfast Express train of AC Express series belonging to Indian Railways (Central Railway zone) that runs between Mumbai and Lucknow in India. It was introduced on 8 April 2017, with fully air-conditioned LHB coach. It is a weekly service. It operates as train number 22121 down from Lokmanya Tilak Terminus to Lucknow Charbagh and as train number 22122 up in the reverse direction. This train formerly shared their rake with the Lokmanya Tilak Terminus–Hazrat Nizamuddin AC Express; however, the rake sharing ended when the latter service was discontinued.

== Schedule ==
22121 AC Superfast Express leaves Mumbai LTT every Saturday at 13:40 hrs IST and reaches the Lucknow Charbagh at 13:20 hrs IST on the next day. On return, the 22122 AC Superfast Express leaves Lucknow Charbagh every Sunday at 16:10 hrs IST from platform number 3 and reaches the Mumbai LTT at 16:15 hrs IST on the next day.

== Service ==
The LTT-Lucknow AC Superfast Express covers the distance of 1,407 km (874 mi) in 23 hours 40 mins at an average speed of 59 km/h (including halts) and while on its return journey as train number 22122 takes 24 hrs 5 mins at an average speed of 58 km/h (including halts). Its highest attained speed is 130 kmph between Khandwa and Jhansi Junction.

As the average speed of the train is above 55 km/h (34 mph), as per Indian Railways rules, its fare includes a Superfast Express surcharge.

== Routeing ==
The 22121 / 22 Lokmanya Tilak Terminus–Lucknow Charbagh AC Superfast Express runs from Lokmanya Tilak Terminus via Thane, Kalyan Junction, Nasik Road, Jalgaon Junction, Bhusaval Junction, Rani Kamlapati, Jhansi Junction railway station to Lucknow Charbagh.

== Traction ==
As the route is electrified, all types of electric locos power the train up to its destination. The LTT-Lucknow AC Superfast Express is mostly hauled by Kalyan-based WAP-7 or Ajni-based WAP-7, from start to end.

== Coaches ==
The LTT-Lucknow AC Superfast Express generally has one AC 1st class coaches, three AC 2 tier class coaches, one pantry car, two luggage cum generator coaches and fifteen AC 3 tier coaches, for a total of 22 coaches. As is customary with most train services in India, coach composition may be amended at the discretion of Indian Railways depending on demand. It has fully air-conditioned LHB coach.

| Loco | 1 | 2 | 3 | 4 | 5 | 6 | 7 | 8 | 9 | 10 | 11 | 12 | 13 | 14 | 15 | 16 | 17 | 18 | 19 | 20 | 21 | 22 |
|---|---|---|---|---|---|---|---|---|---|---|---|---|---|---|---|---|---|---|---|---|---|---|
| | EOG | A1 | A2 | A3 | H1 | PC | B1 | B2 | B3 | B4 | B5 | B6 | B7 | B8 | B9 | B10 | B11 | B12 | B13 | B14 | B15 | EOG |

- EOG consists of Luggage and Generator coach
- B consists of AC 3 Tier coach
- PC consists of Pantry car coach
- A consists of AC 2 Tier coach
- H consists of First Class AC coach
