= Lokmanya Tilak Terminus–Haridwar AC Superfast Express =

Passenger train service in India

Lokmanya Tilak Terminus (Mumbai) - Haridwar AC Superfast Express

Overview
- Service type: AC Express, Superfast Express
- First service: 31 January 2011
- Current operator: Central Railways

Route
- Termini: Lokmanya Tilak Terminus; Haridwar Junction
- Stops: 9
- Distance travelled: 1,778 km (1,105 mi) as 12171 Lokmanya Tilak Terminus Haridwar AC Superfast Express, 1,771 km (1,100 mi) as 12172 Haridwar Lokmanya Tilak Terminus AC Superfast Express
- Average journey time: 29 hours 00 minutes as 12171 Lokmanya Tilak Terminus Haridwar AC Superfast Express, 29 hours 15 minutes as 12172 Haridwar Lokmanya Tilak Terminus AC Superfast Express
- Service frequency: 2 days a week. 12171 Lokmanya Tilak Terminus Haridwar AC Superfast Express – Monday & Thursday. 12172 Haridwar Lokmanya Tilak Terminus AC Superfast Express – Tuesday & Friday.
- Train number: 12171 / 12172

On-board services
- Classes: AC 1st Class, AC 2 tier, AC 3 tier
- Sleeping arrangements: Yes
- Catering facilities: No Pantry Car Coach attached

Technical
- Rolling stock: LHB coach
- Track gauge: 1,676 mm (5 ft 6 in)
- Operating speed: 140 km/h (87 mph) maximum,60.93 km/h (38 mph), including halts

The 12171 / 72 Lokmanya Tilak Terminus Haridwar AC Superfast Express is a Superfast Express train belonging to Indian Railways - Central Railway zone that runs between Lokmanya Tilak Terminus and Haridwar Junction in India.

It operates as train number 12171 from Lokmanya Tilak Terminus to Haridwar Junction and as train number 12172 in the reverse direction serving the states of Maharashtra, Madhya Pradesh, Uttar Pradesh, Delhi & Uttarakhand.

== Coaches ==
The Express has 1 AC 1st Class, 2 AC 2 tier, 15 AC 3 tier & 2 End on Generator coaches. It does not carry a Pantry car coach.

As is customary with most train services in India, Coach Composition may be amended at the discretion of Indian Railways depending on demand.

== Service ==
The Express covers the distance of 1771 kilometres in 29 hours 00 mins, averaging 61.31 km/h (38 mph), as the 12171 to Haridwar and 29 hours 15 mins as 12172 to Lokmanya Tilak, averaging 60.55 km/h (38 mph).

As the average speed of the train is above 55 km/h (34 mph), as per Indian Railways rules, its fare includes a superfast surcharge.

== Routing ==
The Express runs from Lokmanya Tilak Terminus via Nashik Road, Bhusaval Junction, Khandwa Junction, Bhopal Junction, Jhansi Junction, Hazrat Nizamuddin, Meerut City to Haridwar Junction.

== Traction ==
Before the route was fully electrified, a Kalyan based WCAM 3 engine would haul the train from Lokmanya Tilak Terminus up to Bhusaval Junction handing over to a Bhusaval based WAP 4 until Hazrat Nizamuddin after which a Tughlakabad based WDM 3A powers the train for the remainder of the journey.

With Central Railways progressively moving towards a complete changeover from DC to AC traction, it is now hauled by a Bhusaval based WAP 4 from Lokmanya Tilak Terminus until Hazrat Nizamuddin after which a Tughlakabad based WDM 3A powers the train for the remainder of the journey.

As the route has now been fully electrified, it is now an end to end haul by a Bhusaval based WAP 4. More recently, an Ajni/KALYAN(KYN) based Head on Generation enabled WAP 7 has been allocated to this train.

== Timings ==
The 12171 Express leaves Lokmanya Tilak Terminus every Monday and Thursday at 07:55 hrs IST and reaches Haridwar Junction at 13:10 hrs IST the next day.

The 12172 Express leaves Haridwar Junction every Tuesday & Friday at 18:50 hrs IST and reaches Lokmanya Tilak Terminus at 23:45 hrs IST the next day.
