= Parbatsar City railway station =

Railway station in Nagaur district, Rajastha

Parbatsar City

General information
- Location: Parbatsar, Nagaur district, Rajasthan; India
- Coordinates: 26.888499°N 74.762780°E
- Elevation: 430 metres (1,410 ft)
- System: Indian Railways station
- Owner: Indian Railways
- Operator: North Western Railway
- Line: Makrana–Parbatsar City line
- Platforms: 1
- Tracks: 1

Construction
- Structure type: Standard (on ground station)
- Parking: Yes

Other information
- Status: Functioning
- Station code: PBC
- Zone(s): North Western Railway
- Division(s): Jodhpur
Location
- Location within India Location within Rajasthan

Parbatsar City railway station is a railway station in Nagaur district, Rajasthan. Its code is PBC. It serves Parbatsar town. The station consists of a single platform. Passenger trains start from here for Makrana. Notable individuals who have disembarked at this location include Ashok Kumar, Shekhar Kapur, and Devika Rani.
