= Merta City railway station =

Railway station in Rajasthan, India

General information
- Location: Merta City, Nagaur district, Rajasthan; India
- Coordinates: 26.6516°N 74.0353°E
- Elevation: 322 metres (1,056 ft)
- System: Indian Railways station
- Owner: Indian Railways
- Operator: North Western Railway
- Line: Jodhpur–Bathinda line
- Platforms: 1
- Tracks: 2
- Connections: Auto stand

Construction
- Structure type: Standard (on ground station)
- Parking: No
- Cycle facilities: No

Other information
- Status: Operational
- Station code: MEC
- Zone(s): North Western Railway
- Division(s): Jodhpur
Location

Merta City railway station is a major railway station in Nagaur district, Rajasthan. Its code is MEC. It serves Merta City. The station consists of three platforms. The platforms are not well sheltered. It lacks many facilities including water and sanitation.
