= Howrah–SMVT Bengaluru AC Superfast Express =

Train in India

Howrah Junction – SMVT Bengaluru AC Superfast Express

Overview
- Service type: AC Express
- First service: 8 January 2016; 10 years ago
- Current operator: South Eastern Railway

Route
- Termini: Howrah Junction (HWH); SMVT Bengaluru (SMVB)
- Stops: 11
- Distance travelled: 1,954 km (1,214 mi)
- Average journey time: 29 hours 10 minutes
- Service frequency: Weekly
- Train number: 22863 / 22864

On-board services
- Classes: AC First Class, AC 2 Tier, AC 3 Tier
- Seating arrangements: No
- Sleeping arrangements: Yes
- Catering facilities: Available
- Observation facilities: Large windows
- Baggage facilities: Available
- Other facilities: Below the seats

Technical
- Rolling stock: LHB coach
- Track gauge: 1,676 mm (5 ft 6 in)
- Operating speed: 130 km/h (81 mph) maximum, 66 km/h (41 mph) average including halts.
Route map
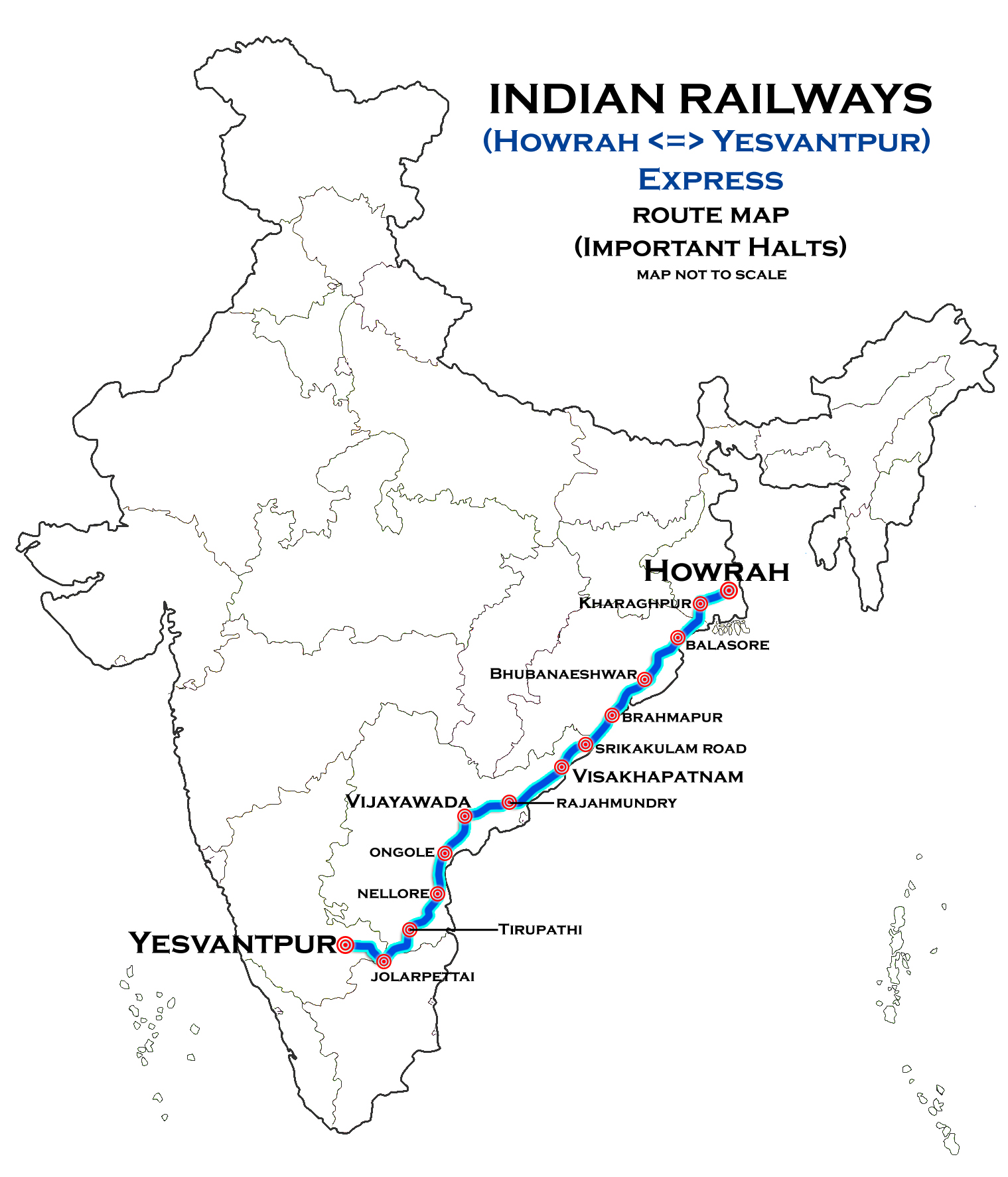

The Howrah–SMVT Bengaluru AC Superfast Express is a Weekly Superfast AC Express train belonging to Indian Railways – South Eastern Railway zone that runs between Howrah Junction and Sir M. Visvesvaraya Terminal, Bengaluru in India.

It operates as train number 22863 from Howrah Junction to Sir M. Visvesvaraya Terminal and as train number 22864 in the reverse direction, serving the states of West Bengal, Odisha, Andhra Pradesh, Tamil Nadu & Karnataka.

== Coaches ==
The 22863 / 64 Howrah Junction – Sir M. Visvesvaraya Terminal AC Superfast Express has 10 AC 3 tier, 3 AC 2 Tier, 1 First Class AC Coach & 2 End on Generator coaches. It carries a pantry car .

As is customary with most train services in India, coach composition may be amended at the discretion of Indian Railways depending on demand.

Loco	1	2	3	4	5	6	7	8	9	10	11	12	13	14	15	16	17
	EOG	B1	B2	B3	B4	B5	B6	B7	B8	B9	B10	PC	H1	A1	A2	A3	EOG

- EOG consists of Luggage and Generator coach
- B consists of AC 3 Tier coach
- PC consists of Pantry car coach
- A consists of AC 2 Tier coach
- H consists of First Class AC coach

== Service ==
The 22863 Howrah Junction–Yesvantpur Junction AC Superfast Express covers the distance of 1,954 km (1,214 mi) in 29 hours (67.00 km/h) and in 29 hours 05 mins as 22864 Yesvantpur Junction–Howrah Junction AC Superfast Express (67.00 km/h).

As the average speed of the train is above 55 km/h (34 mph), as per Indian Railways rules, its fare includes a Superfast surcharge.

== Routeing ==
The 22863 / 64 Howrah–SMVT Bengaluru AC Superfast Express runs from

- Howrah
- Kharagpur Junction
- Balasore
- Cuttack Junction
- Bhubaneswar
- Brahmapur
- Khurda Road Junction
- Vizianagaram Junction
- Simhachalam North
- Vijayawada Junction
- Renigunta Junction
- Katpadi Junction
- Sir M. Visvesvaraya Terminal, Bengaluru

== Traction ==
As the route is electrified, a Tatanagar Loco Shed or Santragachi Loco Shed-based WAP-7 electric locomotive powers the train up to its destination.

== Operation ==
- 22863 Howrah Junction–SMVT Bengaluru AC Superfast Express leaves Howrah Junction every Monday & arriving SMVT Bengaluru on next day.
- 22864 SMVT Bengaluru–Howrah Junction AC Superfast Express leaves SMVT Bengaluru every Wednesday & arriving Howrah Junction on next day.
