= Anuvrat AC Superfast Express =

Train in India

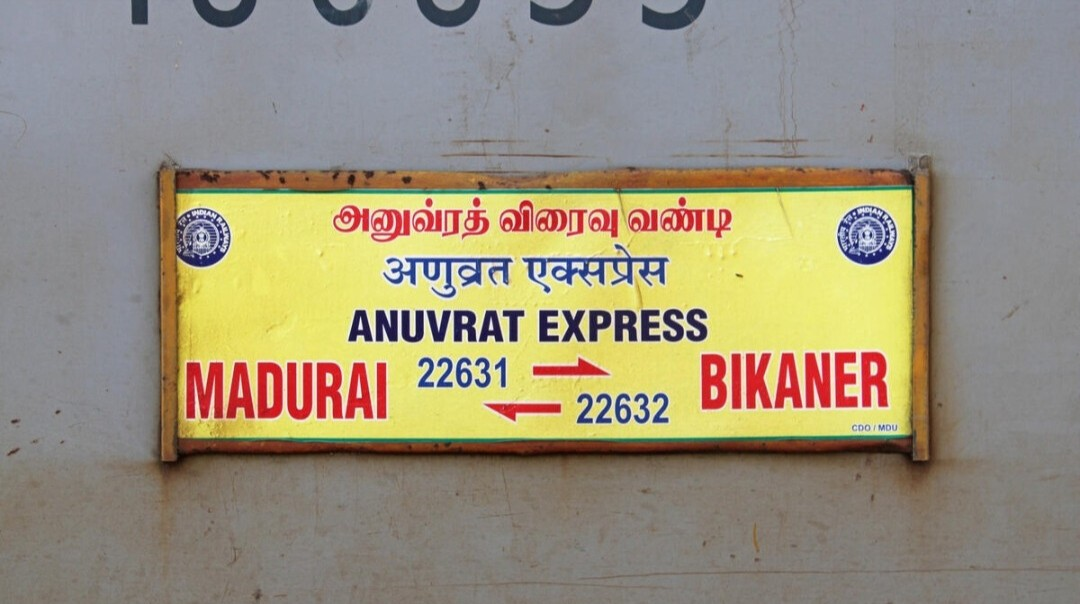
- Anuvrat AC Superfast Express train board

Overview
- Service type: AC Superfast
- First service: 27 March 2014; 12 years ago
- Current operator: Southern Railway

Route
- Termini: Madurai (MDU); Bikaner (BKN)
- Stops: 39
- Distance travelled: 3,060 km (1,901 mi)
- Average journey time: 50 hrs 55 mins
- Service frequency: Weekly
- Train number: 22631 / 22632

On-board services
- Classes: AC First Class, AC 2 Tier, AC 3 Tier
- Seating arrangements: No
- Sleeping arrangements: Yes
- Catering facilities: Available
- Observation facilities: Large windows
- Baggage facilities: Available
- Other facilities: Below the seats

Technical
- Rolling stock: LHB coach
- Track gauge: 1,676 mm (5 ft 6 in)
- Operating speed: 130 km/h (81 mph) maximum, 60 km/h (37 mph) average including halts.
Route map
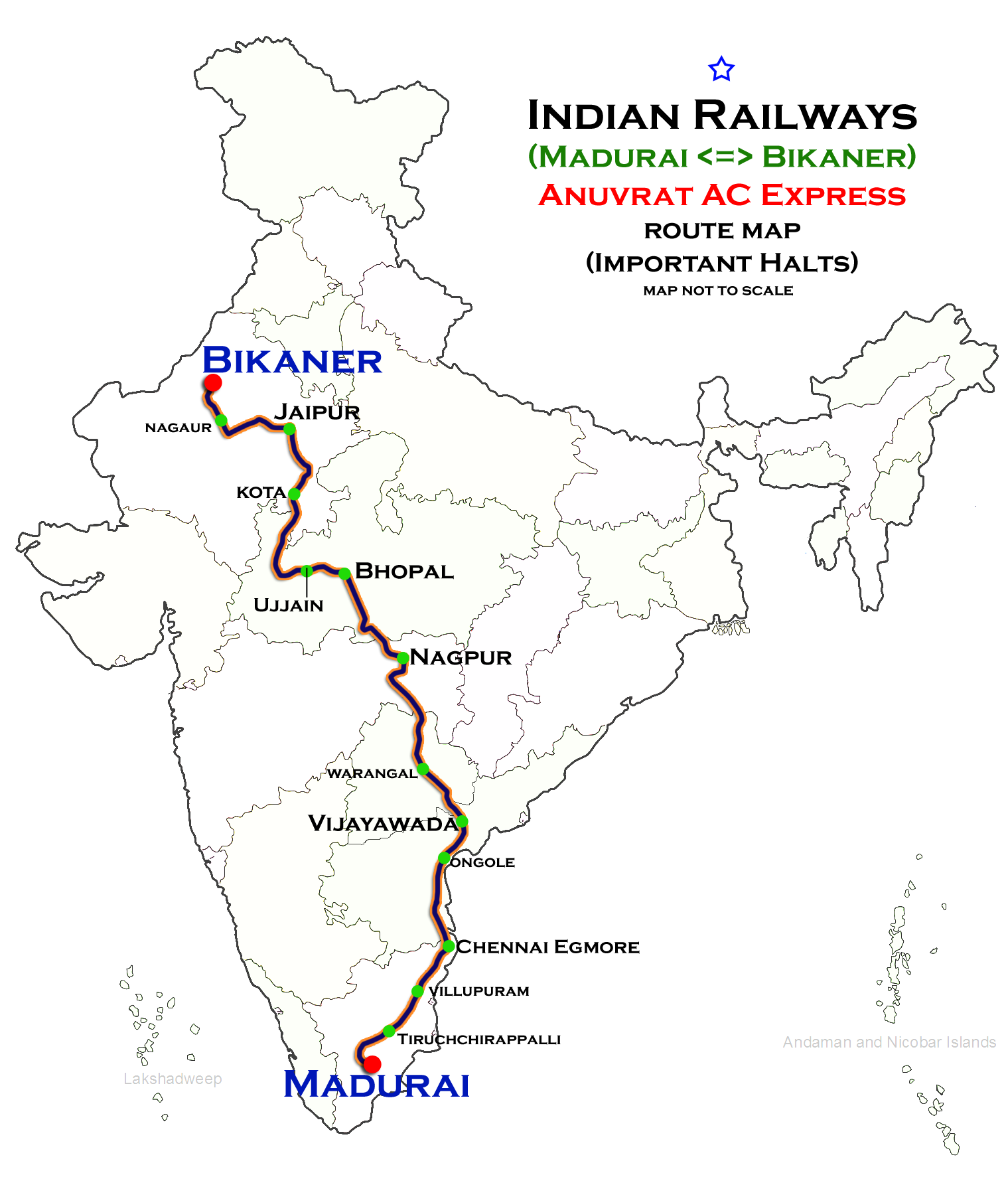

The 22631 / 22632 Anuvrat AC Superfast Express is an AC express train belonging to Indian Railways – Southern Railway zone that runs between Madurai Junction and Bikaner Junction in India. This is the second longest running AC Superfast Express in India after the extension of Lokmanya Tilak Terminus–Agartala AC Express to Agartala.

It operates as train number 22631 from Madurai Junction to Bikaner Junction and as train number 22632 in the reverse direction, serving the states of Tamil Nadu, Andhra Pradesh, Telangana, Maharashtra, Madhya Pradesh and Rajasthan.

Initially this train use to originate from Chennai Central, after which Indian Railways extended its origin from Madurai Junction till Bikaner Junction.

== Coaches ==
The 22631 / 22632 Anuvrat AC Express used to run with ICF coach now it has 1 AC First Class, 4 AC 2 tier, 14 AC 3 tier and 2 End on Generators. It also carries a pantry car..

As is customary with most train services in India, coach composition may be amended at the discretion of Indian Railways depending on demand.

== Service ==
The 22631 Anuvrat AC Express covers the distance of 3,060 km (1,901 mi) in 54 hours 00 mins (56 km/h) and in 52 hours 40 mins as 22632 Anuvrat AC Express (58 km/h).

As the average speed of the train is above 55 km/h (34 mph), as per Indian Railways rules, its fare includes a Superfast surcharge.

== Route & halts ==
The 22631 / 22632 Anuvrat AC Express runs from Madurai Junction via Tiruchchirappalli Junction, Viluppuram Junction, Chennai Egmore, Gudur Junction, Nellore, Ongole,Vijayawada Junction, Warangal, Ramagundam, Balharshah, Nagpur, Itarsi Junction, Bhopal Junction, Ujjain Junction, Nagda Junction, Kota Junction, Sawai Madhopur, Banasthali Niwai, Durgapura, Jaipur Junction, Phulera Junction, Makrana Junction, Degana Junction, Nagaur to Bikaner Junction (subscription required) .

== Direction reversal ==
The train reverses its direction twice at;

- Nagda Junction
- Sawai Madhopur Junction.

== Traction ==
As the route is fully electrified, it is hauled by a Royapuram Loco Shed or Erode Loco Shed based WAP-7 electric locomotive on its entire journey.

== Schedule ==
- 22631 Anuvrat AC Express runs from Madurai Junction every Thursday 11.55 hrs reaching Bikaner Junction on the Saturday at 16.00 hrs .
- 22632 Anuvrat AC Express runs from Bikaner Junction every Sunday at 15.00 hrs reaching Madurai Junction on Tuesday at 18.30 hrs .
