= Santragachi–Chennai Central AC Express =

Superfast Express train service in India

Santragachi Junction - MGR Chennai Central AC Superfast Express

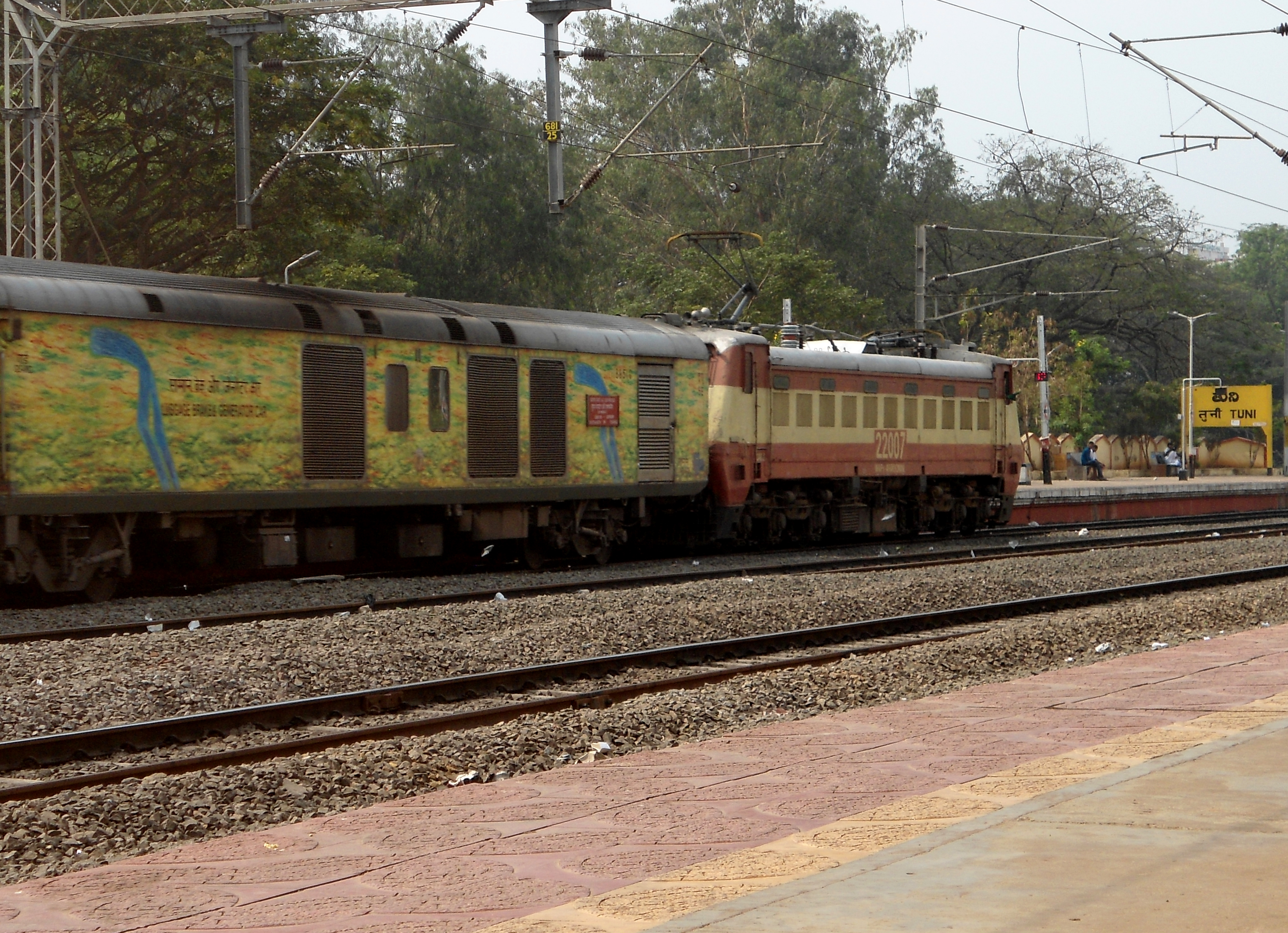
- (Santragacchi–Chennai) AC Express at Tuni with a WAP-1 loco

Overview
- Service type: Superfast Express, AC Express
- First service: 21 January 2014
- Current operator: South Eastern Railways

Route
- Termini: Santragachi Junction; Chennai Central
- Stops: 17
- Distance travelled: 1,655 km (1,028 mi)
- Average journey time: 27 hours 45 mins as 22807 Santragachi–Chennai Central AC Express, 26 hours 30 mins as 22808 Chennai Central–Santragachi AC Express.
- Service frequency: 2 days a week. 22807 Santragachi–Chennai Central AC Express – Tuesday and Friday. 22808 Chennai Central–Santragachi AC Express – Thursday and Sunday.
- Train number: 22807 / 22808

On-board services
- Classes: AC First Class, AC 2 tier, AC 3 tier
- Seating arrangements: No
- Sleeping arrangements: Yes
- Catering facilities: Yes

Technical
- Rolling stock: Standard Indian Railways LHB coach
- Track gauge: 1,676 mm (5 ft 6 in)
- Electrification: Yes
- Operating speed: 140 km/h (87 mph) maximum, 61.01 km/h (38 mph), including halts
Route map
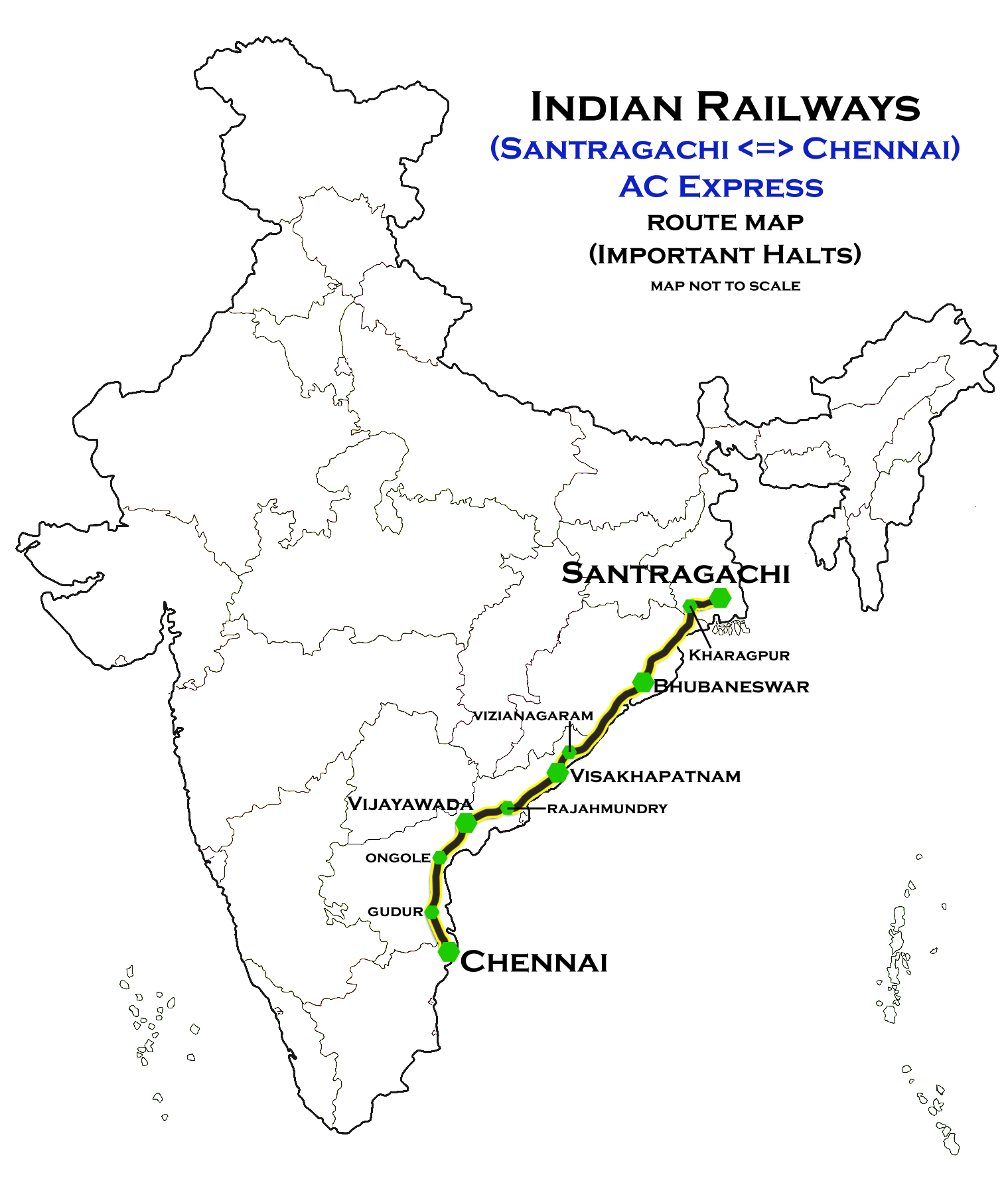

The 22807 / 08 Santragachi–Chennai Central AC Express is a Bi - Weekly Superfast AC Express train belonging to Indian Railways – South Eastern Railway zone that runs between Santragachi Junction and Chennai Central in India.

It operates as train number 22807 from Santragachi Junction to Chennai Central and as train number 22808 in the reverse direction, serving the 4 states of West Bengal, Odisha, Andhra Pradesh and Tamil Nadu.

== Coaches ==
The 22807 / 08 Santragachi–Chennai Central AC Express has 1 AC First Class, 4 AC 2 tier, 10 AC 3 tier and 2 End on Generator cum Luggage Rack Coaches. In addition, it carries a pantry car coach .

As is customary with most train services in India, coach composition may be amended at the discretion of Indian Railways depending on demand.

== Service ==
The 22807 Santragachi–Chennai Central AC Express covers the distance of 1655 kilometres in 27 hours 45 mins (59.64 km/h) and in 26 hours 30 mins as 22808 Chennai Central–Santragachi AC Express (62.45 km/h).

As the average speed of the train is above 55 km/h (34 mph), as per Indian Railways rules, its fare includes a Superfast surcharge.

== Routeing ==
The 22807 / 08 Santragachi–Chennai Central AC Express runs from Santragachi Junction via Kharagpur Junction, Cuttack Junction, Bhubaneswar, Khurda Road Jn, Visakhapatnam, Vijayawada Junction, Gudur Junction to Chennai Central.

It reverses direction of travel at Visakhapatnam.

== Traction ==
As the route is fully electrified, a Santragachi-based WAP-7 and WAP-1 locomotive hauls the train from Santragachi Junction up to Visakhapatnam and afterwards a Royapuram-based WAP-7 or WAP-1 locomotive hauls the train to Chennai Central.

== Operation ==
22807 Santragachi–Chennai Central AC Express runs from Santragachi Junction every Tuesday and Friday reaching Chennai Central the next day.

22808 Chennai Central–Santragachi AC Express runs from Chennai Central every Thursday and Sunday, reaching Santragachi Junction the next day.
