= Marudhar Express (via Faizabad) =

Indian train service

Overview
- Service type: Express
- First service: 15 August 1998
- Current operator: North Western Railways

Route
- Termini: Jodhpur Junction (JU); Varanasi Junction (BSB)
- Stops: 34 as 14854 Jodhpur–Varanasi Junction Marudhar Express, 33 as 14853 Varanasi Junction–Jodhpur Marudhar Express, 30 as 14864 Jodhpur–Varanasi Junction Marudhar Express, 29 as 14863 Varanasi Junction–Jodhpur Marudhar Express, 31 as 14866 Jodhpur–Varanasi Junction Marudhar Express, 29 as 14865 Varanasi Junction–Jodhpur Marudhar Express.
- Distance travelled: 1,203 km (748 mi) as 14854 / 53 Jodhpur–Varanasi Junction Marudhar Express, 1,161 km (721 mi) as 14864 Jodhpur–Varanasi Junction Marudhar Express, 1,163 km (723 mi) as 14863 Varanasi Junction–Jodhpur Marudhar Express, 1,179 km (733 mi) as 14866 Jodhpur–Varanasi Junction Marudhar Express, 1,181 km (734 mi) as 14865 Varanasi Junction–Jodhpur Marudhar Express.
- Average journey time: 24 hours 45 mins as 14854 Jodhpur–Varanasi Junction Marudhar Express, 24 hours 30 mins as 14853 Varanasi Junction–Jodhpur Marudhar Express, 22 hours 50 mins as 14864 Jodhpur–Varanasi Junction Marudhar Express, 23 hours 35 mins as 14863 Varanasi Junction–Jodhpur Marudhar Express, 23 hours 45 mins as 14866 Jodhpur–Varanasi Junction Marudhar Express, 23 hours 35 mins as 14865 Varanasi Junction–Jodhpur Marudhar Express.
- Service frequency: 14854 Jodhpur–Varanasi Junction Marudhar Express–Monday, Thursday & Saturday, 14853 Varanasi Junction–Jodhpur Marudhar Express–Monday, Wednesday & Saturday, 14864 Jodhpur–Varanasi Junction Marudhar Express–Tuesday, Friday & Sunday, 14863 Varanasi Junction–Jodhpur Marudhar Express–Tuesday, Friday & Sunday, 14866 Jodhpur–Varanasi Junction Marudhar Express–Wednesday, 14865 Varanasi Junction–Jodhpur Marudhar Express – Thursday.
- Train number: 14853 / 54 / 63 / 64 / 65 / 66

On-board services
- Classes: AC 2 tier, AC 3 tier, Sleeper class, General Unreserved
- Seating arrangements: Yes
- Sleeping arrangements: Yes
- Catering facilities: No pantry car attached
- Observation facilities: Rake sharing between 14853 / 54 / 63 / 64 / 65 / 66 Jodhpur–Varanasi Junction Marudhar Express

Technical
- Rolling stock: Standard Indian Railways coaches
- Track gauge: LHB Coaches
- Operating speed: 110 km/h (68 mph) maximum 48.85 km/h (30 mph) as 14854 / 53 Jodhpur–Varanasi Junction Marudhar Express, 14864 / 63 Jodhpur–Varanasi Junction Marudhar Express – 50.07 km/h (31 mph), 14866 / 65 Jodhpur–Varanasi Junction Marudhar Express – 49.86 km/h (31 mph) including halts.

The 14853 / 54 / 63 / 64 / 65 / 66 Jodhpur–Varanasi Junction Marudhar Express is an Express train belonging to Indian Railways – North Western Railway zone that runs between Jodhpur Junction & Varanasi Junction in India.

It operates as train number 14854 / 64 / 66 from Jodhpur Junction to Varanasi Junction and as train number 14853 / 63 / 65 in the reverse direction, serving the states of Uttar Pradesh & Rajasthan. It is the fastest train between Jaipur and Lucknow and one of the most important train of NWR.

The word Marudhar translates as Master of Air.

== Coaches ==
The 14853 / 54 / 63 / 64 / 65 / 66 Jodhpur–Varanasi Junction Marudhar Express has 2 AC 2 tier, 3 AC 3 tier, 12 Sleeper class, 4 General Unreserved & 2 SLR (Seating cum Luggage Rake) coaches hence total 23 coaches. It does not carry a pantry car.

As is customary with most train services in India, coach composition may be amended at the discretion of Indian Railways depending on demand.

== Service ==
- 14854 Jodhpur–Varanasi Junction Marudhar Express covers the distance of 1,203 kilometres (748 mi) in 24 hours 45 mins (48.61 km/h).
- 14853 Varanasi Junction–Jodhpur Marudhar Express covers the distance of 1,203 kilometres (748 mi) in 24 hours 30 mins (49.10 km/h).
- 14864 Jodhpur–Varanasi Junction Marudhar Express covers the distance of 1,161 kilometres (721 mi) in 22 hours 50 mins (50.85 km/h).
- 14863 Varanasi Junction-Jodhpur Marudhar Express covers the distance of 1,163 kilometres (723 mi) in 23 hours 35 mins (49.31 km/h).
- 14866 Jodhpur–Varanasi Junction Marudhar Express covers the distance of 1,179 kilometres (733 mi) in 23 hours 45 mins (49.64 km/h).
- 14865 Varanasi Junction-Jodhpur Marudhar Express covers the distance of 1,181 kilometres (734 mi) in 23 hours 35 mins (50.08 km/h).

As the average speed of the train is below 55 km/h (34 mph), as per Indian Railways rules, its fare does not include a Superfast surcharge.

== Routeing ==
The 14853 / 54 / 63 / 64 / 65 / 66 Jodhpur–Varanasi Junction Marudhar Express runs from Jodhpur Junction via Degana Junction, Jaipur Junction, Bharatpur Junction, Agra Fort, Kanpur Central, Lucknow NR, thereafter Faizabad Junction (14854 / 53) or Sultanpur (14864 / 63) or Rae Bareli Junction (14866 / 65) to Varanasi Junction.

== Traction ==
The entire route is yet to be fully electrified.

- 14854 / 53 / 66 / 65 Jodhpur–Varanasi Junction Marudhar Express via Faizabad Junction & Rae Bareli Junction – a Bhagat Ki Kothi-based WDP-4 locomotive hauls the train from Jodhpur Junction up to Agra Fort handing over to a Ghaziabad-based WAP-4 or WAP-7 locomotive until Lucknow NR following which a Lucknow-based WDM-3A locomotive powers the train for the remainder of the journey.
- 14864 / 63 Jodhpur–Varanasi Junction Marudhar Express via Sultanpur – a Bhagat Ki Kothi-based WDP-4 locomotive hauls the train from Jodhpur Junction up to Agra Fort handing over to a Ghaziabad-based WAP-4 or WAP-7 locomotive which powers the train for the remainder of the journey.

== Operation ==
- 14854 Jodhpur–Varanasi Junction Marudhar Express via Faizabad Junction leaves Jodhpur Junction every Monday, Thursday & Saturday and reaches Varanasi Junction the next day.
- 14853 Varanasi Junction–Jodhpur Marudhar Express via Faizabad Junction leaves Varanasi Junction every Monday, Wednesday & Saturday and reaches Jodhpur Junction the next day.
- 14864 Jodhpur–Varanasi Junction Marudhar Express via Sultanpur leaves Jodhpur Junction every Tuesday, Friday & Sunday and reaches Varanasi Junction the next day.
- 14863 Varanasi Junction–Jodhpur Marudhar Express via Sultanpur leaves Varanasi Junction every Tuesday, Friday & Sunday and reaches Jodhpur Junction the next day.
- 14866 Jodhpur–Varanasi Junction Marudhar Express via Rae Bareli Junction leaves Jodhpur Junction every Wednesday and reaches Varanasi Junction the next day.
- 14865 Varanasi Junction–Jodhpur Marudhar Express via Rae Bareli Junction leaves Varanasi Junction every Thursday and reaches Jodhpur Junction the next day.

== See also ==
- Varanasi Junction railway station
- Jodhpur Junction railway station
- Marudhar Express (via Pratapgarh)
- Marudhar Express (via Sultanpur)
