= Gotan railway station =

Railway Station in Rajasthan

Gotan

General information
- Location: Gotan, Nagaur district, Rajasthan; India
- Coordinates: 26°39′10.5″N 73°44′18.9″E
- Elevation: 324 metres (1,063 ft)
- System: Indian Railways station
- Owner: Indian Railways
- Operator: North Western Railway
- Lines: Jodhpur–Bathinda line Bikaner–Merta Road line Falna–Merta Road line
- Platforms: 2
- Tracks: 2

Construction
- Structure type: Standard (on-ground station)
- Parking: Yes
- Cycle facilities: No

Other information
- Status: Functioning
- Station code: GOTN
- Zone(s): North Western Railway
- Division(s): Jodhpur
Location
- Location within India Location within Rajasthan

Gotan railway station is a railway station in Nagaur district, Rajasthan. Its code is GOTN. It serves Gotan village. The station consists of a pair of platforms. Passenger and Express trains halt here.

== Trains ==
The following trains halt at Gotan railway station in both directions:

- Malani Express
- Bandra Terminus–Jammu Tawi Vivek Express
- Bhagat Ki Kothi–Bilaspur Express
- Ahmedabad–Jammu Tawi Express
- Mandore Express
- Ranthambore Express
- Jaipur–Jodhpur Intercity Express
- Marudhar Express
- Ranakpur Express
- Kalka–Barmer Express
- Bhagat Ki Kothi–Mannargudi Weekly Express
