= Makrana Junction railway station =

Railway station in Rajasthan, India

Makrana Junction

General information
- Location: Makrana, Nagaur district, Rajasthan; India
- Coordinates: 27.037010°N 74.725073°E
- Elevation: 426 metres (1,398 ft)
- System: Indian Railways station
- Owner: Indian Railways
- Operator: North Western Railway
- Lines: Merta Road–Rewari line Makrana–Parbatsar City line
- Platforms: 3
- Tracks: 3

Construction
- Structure type: Standard (on-ground station)
- Parking: Yes
- Cycle facilities: No

Other information
- Status: Functioning
- Station code: MKN
- Zone(s): North Western Railway
- Division(s): Jodhpur
Location
- Location within India Location within Rajasthan

Makrana Junction railway station is a railway station in Nagaur district, Rajasthan. Its code is MKN. It serves Makrana City. The station consists of 3 platforms. Passenger, Express, and Superfast trains halt here.
