= Merta Road Junction railway station =

Railway station in Rajasthan, India

Merta Road Junction
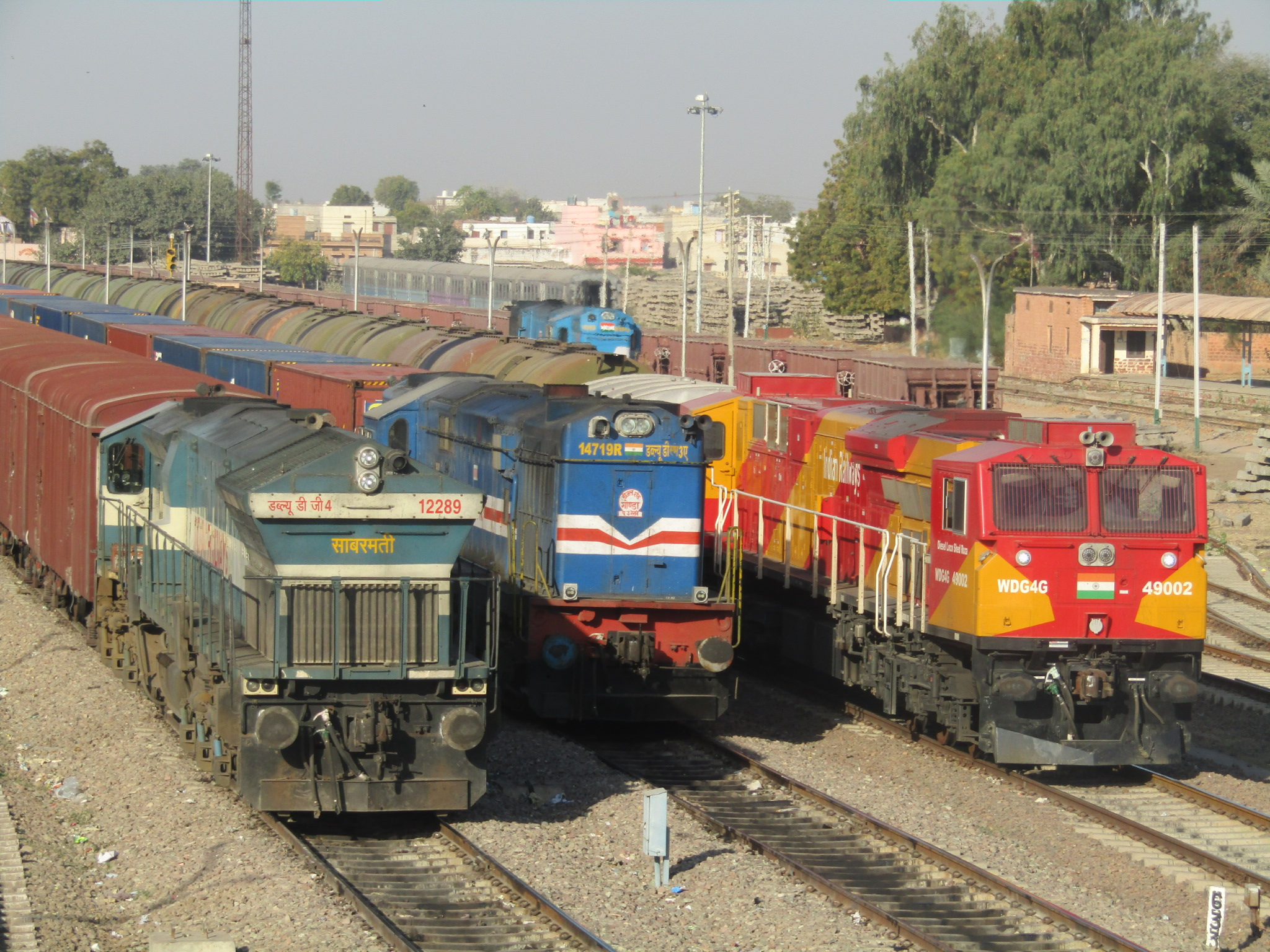
- Three freight locomotives standing at Merta Road Junction railway station.

General information
- Location: Merta Road, Nagaur district, Rajasthan; India
- Coordinates: 26.7278°N 73.9179°E
- Elevation: 322 metres (1,056 ft)
- System: Indian Railways station
- Owner: Indian Railways
- Operator: North Western Railways
- Lines: Jodhpur–Bathinda line, Bikaner–Merta Road line, Falna–Merta Road line,,Merta Road–Rewari line
- Platforms: 3
- Tracks: 5
- Connections: Auto stand

Construction
- Structure type: Standard (on ground station)
- Parking: Yes
- Cycle facilities: Yes
- Accessible: Available

Other information
- Status: Functioning
- Station code: MTD
- Zone(s): North Western Railway zone
- Division(s): Jodhpur
Location
- Location within Rajasthan Location within India

Merta Road Junction railway station (station code:- MTD) also known as Merta Road Station which serves Merta Road, India. Approximately 75–100 passenger trains pass through the station each day requiring its 3 platforms and serving more than 8000-10000 passengers per day. The station located around 105 km away from Jodhpur at Jodhpur–Bikaner route. This is a major railway station in Nagaur district, Rajasthan. The platform is semi well sheltered. Almost all facilities are available including water, sanitation.
