= Banaras–Hadapsar (Pune) Amrit Bharat Express =

Amrit Bharat Express train route in India

Banaras - Hadapsar (Pune) Amrit Bharat Express

Overview
- Service type: Amrit Bharat Express, Superfast
- Status: Active
- Locale: Uttar Pradesh, Madhya Pradesh and Maharashtra
- First service: 28 April 2026; 31 days ago (Inaugural); 2 May 2026; 27 days ago (Commercial)
- Current operator: North Eastern Railways (NER)

Route
- Termini: Banaras (BNRS); Hadapsar (HDP)
- Stops: 20
- Distance travelled: 1,710 km (1,063 mi)
- Average journey time: 29 hrs 55 mins
- Service frequency: Daily
- Train number: 22589/22590
- Lines used: Banaras–Prayagraj line (Towards Gyanpur Road ); Prayagraj–Jhansi line (Towards Fatehpur, Govindpuri ); Jhansi–Itarsi line (Towards Bina Junction, Rani Kamalapati ); Itarsi–Bhusaval line (Towards Harda, Khandwa Junction ); Bhusaval–Daund Chord line (Towards Jalgaon Junction, Manmad Junction, Ahilyanagar )

On-board services
- Class: Sleeper Class Coach (SL) General Unreserved Coach (GS)
- Seating arrangements: Yes
- Sleeping arrangements: Yes
- Auto-rack arrangements: Upper
- Catering facilities: On-board Catering
- Observation facilities: Saffron-Grey
- Entertainment facilities: Electric Outlets; Reading lights; Bottle Holder
- Other facilities: CCTV cameras; Bio-Vacuum Toilets; Foot-Operated Water Taps; Passenger information system

Technical
- Rolling stock: Modified LHB Coaches
- Track gauge: Indian gauge 1,676 mm (5 ft 6 in) broad gauge
- Electrification: 25 kV 50 Hz AC Overhead line
- Operating speed: 57 km (35 mi) (Avg.)
- Track owner: Indian Railways
- Rake sharing: No
Route map
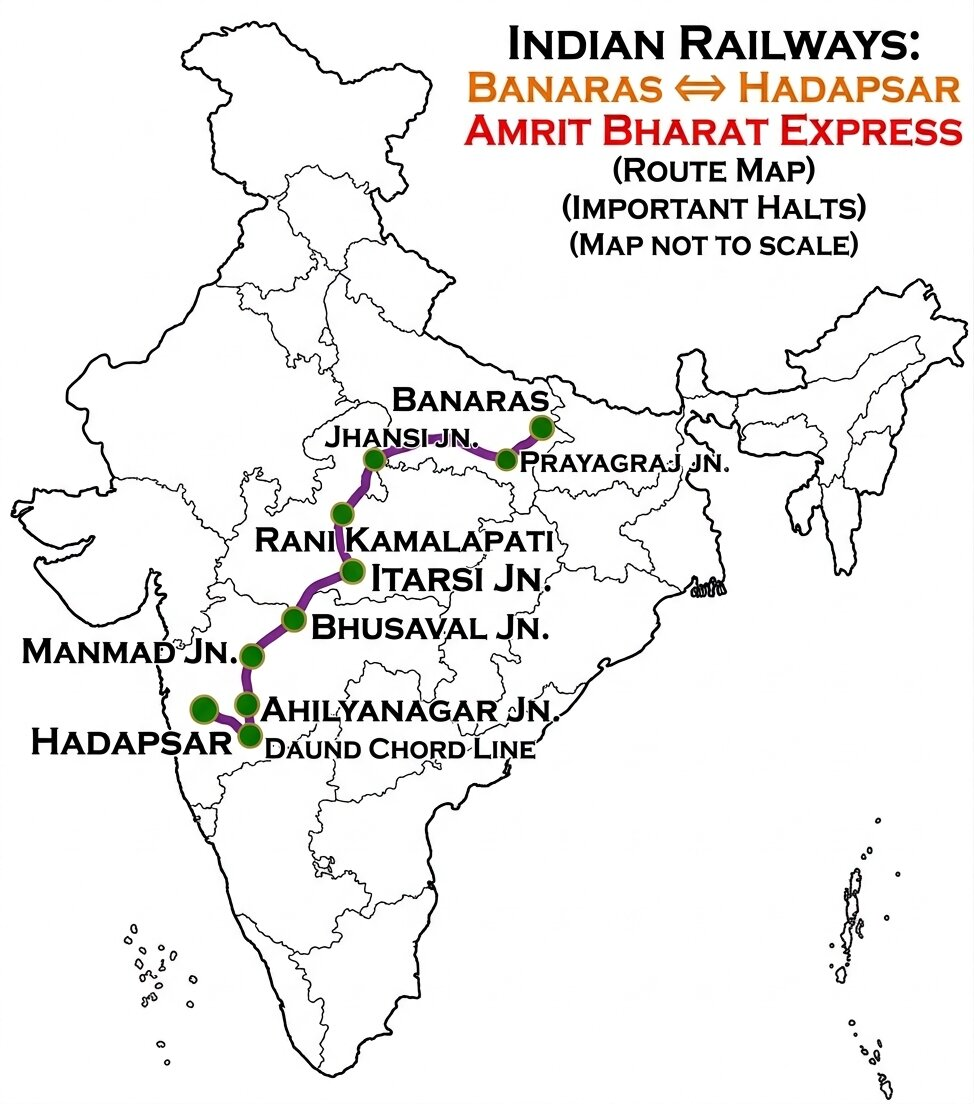

The 22589/22590 Banaras–Hadapsar (Pune) Amrit Bharat Express is India's 32nd Non-AC Superfast Amrit Bharat Express train, which runs across the states of Uttar Pradesh, Madhya Pradesh and Maharashtra by connecting Banaras the Holy Ganga pilgrims city in Uttar Pradesh with Hadapsar (Pune), a major satellite terminal of the cultural capital of Maharashtra, Pune in India.

The express train was inaugurated by 28 April 2026 by Honb'le Prime Minister Narendra Modi through video conference.

== Overview ==
The train is operated by Indian Railways, connecting Banaras and Hadapsar. It is currently operated 22589/22590 on daily basis.

== Rakes ==
It is the 32nd Amrit Bharat 2.0 Express train in which the locomotives were designed by Chittaranjan Locomotive Works (CLW) at Chittaranjan, West Bengal and the coaches were designed and manufactured by the Integral Coach Factory at Perambur, Chennai under the Make in India Initiative. Pulled by GKP WAP5

== Schedule ==
Train Schedule: Banaras ↔ Hadapsar Amrit Bharat Express
Train No.	Station Code	Departure Station	Departure Time	Departure Day	Arrival Station	Arrival Hours
22589	BNRS	Banaras	6:15 PM	Hadapsar	12:10 AM	29h 55m
22590	HDP	Hadapsar	7:50 AM	Banaras	2:30 PM	30h 40m

== Routes and halts ==
The halts for this 22589/22590 Banaras – Hadapsar (Pune) Amrit Bharat Express are as follows :-

1. Banaras
2. Gyanpur Road
3. Prayagraj Junction
4. Fatehpur
5. Govindpuri
6. Orai
7. Jhansi Junction
8. Bina Junction
9. Rani Kamalapati
10. Narmadapuram
11. Itarsi Junction
12. Harda
13. Khandwa Junction
14. Bhusaval Junction
15. Jalgaon Junction
16. Manmad Junction
17. Kopargaon
18. Ahilyanagar Junction
19. Daund Chord Line
20. Hadapsar

== Rake reversal ==
No rake Reversal or rake share.

== See also ==
● Amrit Bharat Express

● Vande Bharat Sleeper Express

● Duronto Express

● Banaras

● Hadapsar

== Notes ==
a. Runs daily in a week with both directions.
