= Subedarganj–Lokmanya Tilak Terminus Amrit Bharat Express =

Amrit Bharat Express train route in India

Subedarganj – Mumbai LTT Amrit Bharat Express

Overview
- Service type: Amrit Bharat Express, Superfast
- Status: Active
- Locale: Uttar Pradesh, Madhya Pradesh and Maharashtra
- First service: 24 August 2026; 2 months ago (Inaugural); 27 August 2026; 59 days ago (Commercial)
- Current operator: North Central Railways (NCR)

Route
- Termini: Subedarganj (SFG); Lokmanya Tilak Terminus (LTT)
- Stops: 20
- Distance travelled: 1,670 km (1,038 mi)
- Average journey time: 32 hrs 40 mins
- Service frequency: Weekly
- Train number: 14121/14122
- Lines used: Subedarganj–Fatehpur–Govindpuri line; Satna–Katni–Jabalpur line; Itarsi–Khandwa–Bhusaval line; Nashik Road–Kalyan line; Thane–Lokmanya Tilak Terminus line

On-board services
- Classes: Sleeper class coach (SL); General unreserved coach (GS)
- Seating arrangements: Yes
- Sleeping arrangements: Yes
- Auto-rack arrangements: Upper
- Catering facilities: No
- Observation facilities: Saffron-grey
- Entertainment facilities: Electric outlets; Reading lights; Bottle holder
- Other facilities: CCTV cameras; Bio-vacuum toilets; Foot-operated water taps; Passenger information system

Technical
- Rolling stock: Modified LHB coaches
- Track gauge: Indian gauge
- Electrification: 25 kV 50 Hz AC overhead line
- Operating speed: 51 km (32 mi) (Avg.)
- Track owner: Indian Railways
- Rake sharing: Yes
Route map
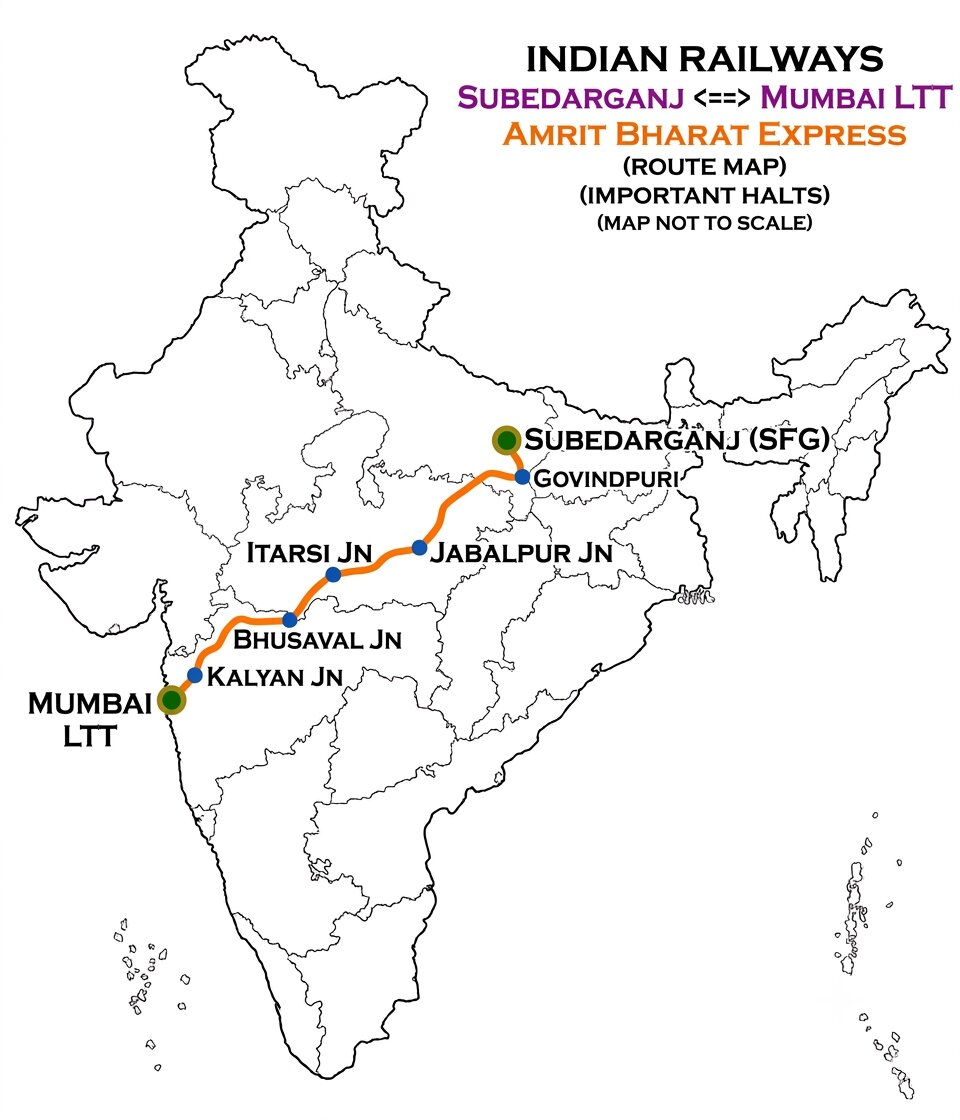

The 14121/14122 Subedarganj–Mumbai LTT Amrit Bharat Express is India's 40th Non-AC Superfast Amrit Bharat Express train, which runs across the states of Uttar Pradesh Madhya Pradesh and Maharashtra by connecting Subedarganj of Prayagraj, the growing transit hub in Uttar Pradesh with Lokmanya Tilak Terminus of Mumbai, the financial capital of Maharashtra.

The express train is inaugurated on 2026 by Honorable Prime Minister Narendra Modi through video conference.

== Overview ==
The train is operated by Indian Railways, connecting Subedarganj and Lokmanya Tilak Terminus. It is currently operated 14121/14122 on weekly basis.

== Rakes ==
It is the 40th Amrit Bharat 2.0 Express train in which the locomotives were designed by Chittaranjan Locomotive Works (CLW) at Chittaranjan, West Bengal and the coaches were designed and manufactured by the Integral Coach Factory at Perambur, Chennai under the Make in India Initiative.

== Schedule ==
Train Schedule: Subedarganj ↔ Mumbai LTT Amrit Bharat Express
Train No.	Station Code	Departure Station	Departure Time	Departure Day	Arrival Station	Arrival Hours
14121	SFG	Subedarganj	12:10 PM	Lokmanya Tilak Terminus	08:50 PM	32h 40m
14122	LTT	Lokmanya Tilak Terminus	10:50 PM	Subedarganj	07:30 AM	32h 40m

== Routes and halts ==
The important halts of the train are :

- Subedarganj
- Fatehpur
- Govindpuri
- Baruwa Sumerpur
- Ragaul
- Banda
- Chitrakutdham Karwi
- Satna Junction
- Maihar
- Katni Junction
- Jabalpur Junction
- Narsinghpur
- Pipariya
- Itarsi Junction
- Khandwa Junction
- Bhusaval Junction
- Nasik Road
- Kalyan Junction
- Thane
- Lokmanya Tilak Terminus

== Rake reversal or rake share ==
No rake reversal or rake share.

== See also ==
- Amrit Bharat Express
- Vande Bharat Sleeper Express
- Vande Bharat Express
- Uday Express
- Humsafar Express

== Notes ==
a. Runs a day in a week with both directions.
