= Rajendra Nagar Terminal–New Delhi Amrit Bharat Express =

Amrit Bharat Express train route in India

Rajendra Nagar Terminal – New Delhi Amrit Bharat Express
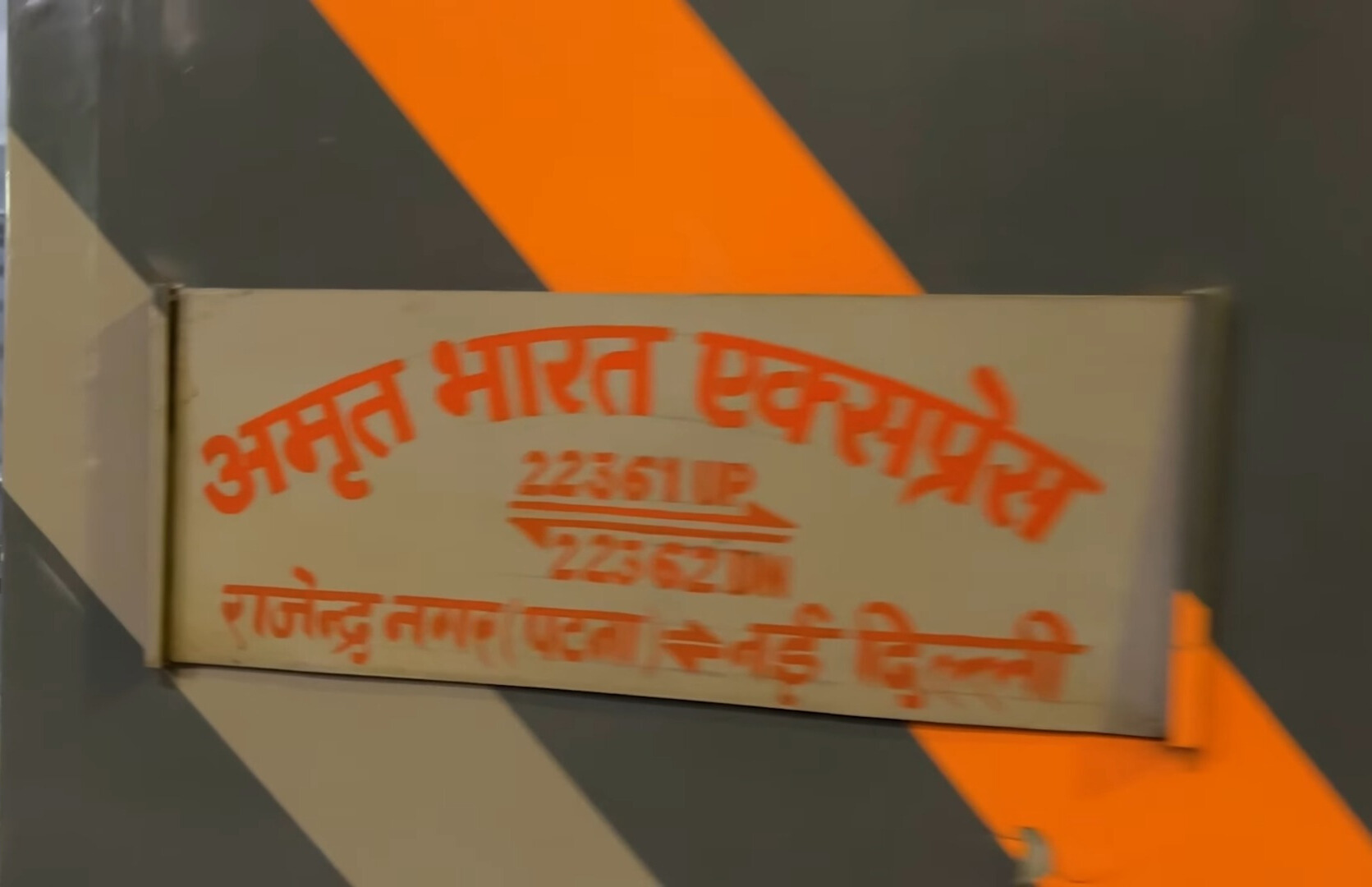

Overview
- Service type: Amrit Bharat Express, Superfast Express Train
- Locale: Bihar, Uttar Pradesh and New Delhi
- First service: 18 July 2025; 14 months ago (Inaugural); 31 July 2025; 13 months ago (Commercial)
- Current operator: East Central Railways (ECR)

Route
- Termini: Rajendra Nagar Terminal (RJPB); New Delhi (NDLS)
- Stops: 08
- Distance travelled: 999 km (621 mi)
- Service frequency: Daily
- Train number: 22361 / 22362
- Lines used: Rajendra Nagar Terminal–Patna–Pt. Deen Dayal Upadhyaya line; Pt. Deen Dayal Upadhyaya–Kanpur–Ghaziabad line; Ghaziabad–New Delhi line

On-board services
- Class: Sleeper class coach (SL) General unreserved coach (GEN)
- Seating arrangements: Yes
- Sleeping arrangements: Yes
- Entertainment facilities: Electric outlets; Reading lights; Bottle holder
- Other facilities: CCTV cameras; Bio-vacuum toilets; Foot-operated water taps; Passenger information system

Technical
- Rolling stock: Modified LHB coaches
- Track gauge: Indian gauge
- Electrification: 25 kV 50 Hz AC overhead line
- Operating speed: 60 km/h (37 mph) (Avg.)
- Average length: 23.54 m (77.2 ft) (each) and 22 coaches
- Track owner: Indian Railways
- Rake maintenance: Rajendra Nagar Terminal (RJPB)

The 22361/22362 Rajendra Nagar Terminal – New Delhi Amrit Bharat Express is India's 4th Non-AC Superfast Amrit Bharat Express train, which currently runs across the states of Bihar, Uttar Pradesh and New Delhi by connecting the and capital city of Bihar Patna, with the national capital, New Delhi in India. It is the first Amrit Bharat service to be categorized as a superfast express train in Indian Railways.

This train was inaugurated on 18 July 2025 by Prime Minister Narendra Modi via virtual conferencing from Motihari, a city in the state of Bihar.

== Rakes ==
The train uses two dedicated Amrit Bharat 2.0 trainsets, the locomotives of which are designed by Chittaranjan Locomotive Works (CLW) in Chittaranjan, West Bengal and the coaches are designed and manufactured by the Integral Coach Factory at Perambur, Chennai under the Make in India initiative.

Each rake has 22 coaches, out of which 2 are Seating cum Luggage (SLR) coaches, 11 are General Unreserved (GS) coaches, 8 are Sleeper class (SL) coaches and 1 is a pantry car (PC) coach. The primary maintenance of the rake is executed at Rajendra Nagar Terminal coaching complex.

== Service ==
- The 22361 Rajendra Nagar Terminal – New Delhi Amrit Bharat Express leaves Rajendra Nagar Terminal at 19:45 hrs every day and reaches New Delhi the next day at 13:10 hrs. It covers its journey in 17 hrs 25 min, averaging at 57 km/h (35 mph).
- The 22362 New Delhi – Rajendra Nagar Terminal Amrit Bharat Express leaves New Delhi at 19:10 hrs every day and reaches Rajendra Nagar Terminal the next day at 11:45 hrs. It covers its journey in 16 hrs 35 min, averaging at 60 km/h (37 mph).
- The maximum permissible speed of this train is 130 km/h (81 mph).

== Train halts ==
The halts for this 22361/22362 Rajendra Nagar Terminal – New Delhi Amrit Bharat Express is as given below:

1. Rajendra Nagar Terminal (start)
2. Patna Junction
3. Danapur
4. Ara Junction
5. Buxar
6. Pandit DD Upadhyaya Junction
7. Subedarganj
8. Govindpuri
9. Ghaziabad Junction
10. New Delhi (end)

== See also ==
- Amrit Bharat Express
- Vande Bharat Express
- Tejas Express
- Gatimaan Express
- Rajendra Nagar Terminal railway station
- New Delhi railway station
