= Banaras–Sealdah Amrit Bharat Express =

Amrit Bharat Express train route in India

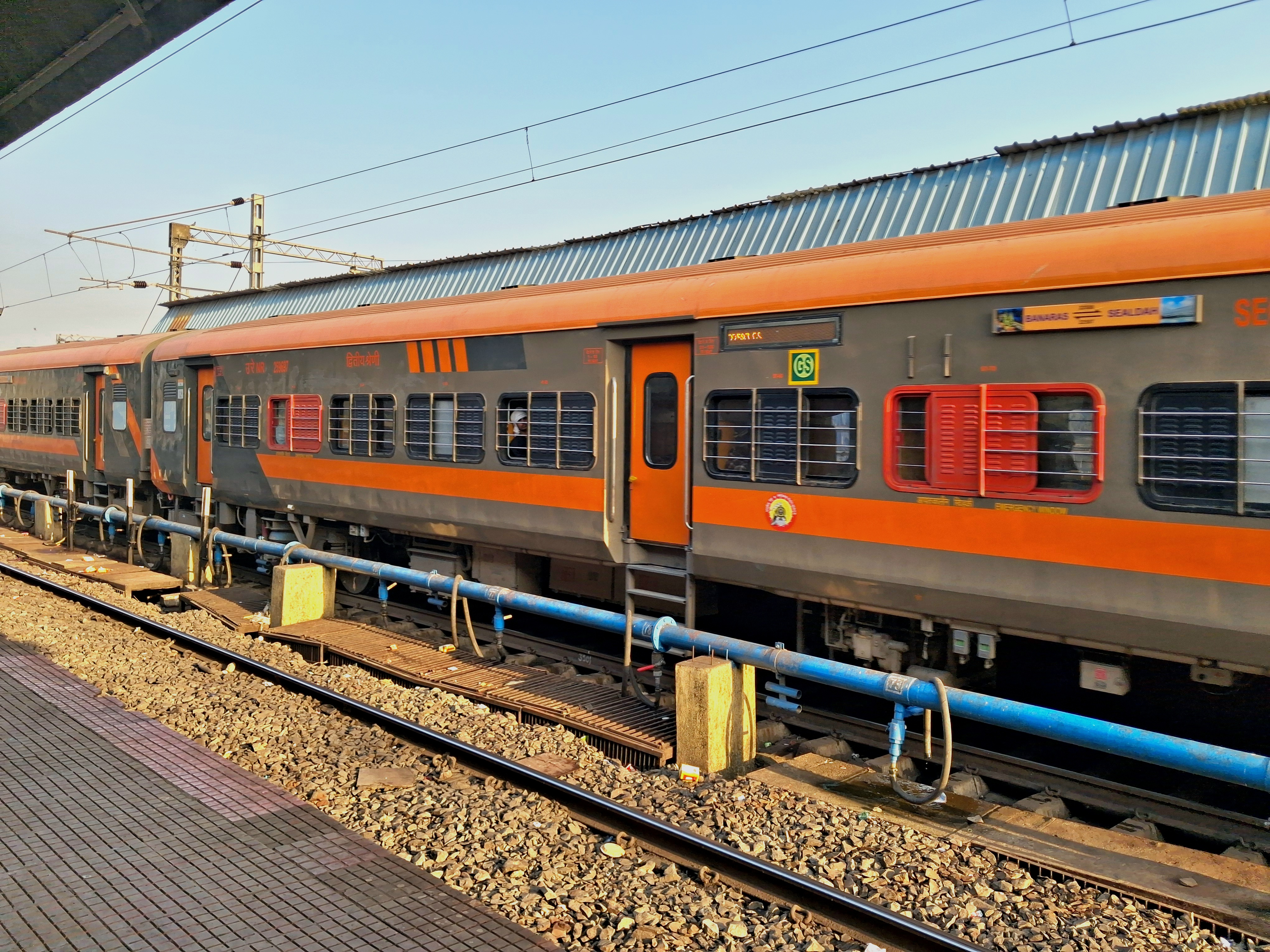

Overview
- Service type: Amrit Bharat Express, Superfast
- Status: Active
- Locale: Uttar Pradesh, Bihar, Jharkhand and West Bengal
- First service: 18 January 2026; 7 months ago (Inaugural); 24 January 2026; 7 months ago (Commercial)
- Current operator: North Eastern Railways (NER)

Route
- Termini: Banaras (BNRS); Sealdah (SDAH)
- Stops: 8
- Distance travelled: 772 km (480 mi)
- Average journey time: 11 hrs 50 mins
- Service frequency: Tri-weekly
- Train number: 22588/22587
- Lines used: Pt. Deen Dayal Upadhyaya–Banaras line; Gaya–Pt. Deen Dayal Upadhyaya line; Asansol–Patna line; Sealdah–Asansol line

On-board services
- Class: Sleeper class coach (SL) General unreserved coach (GS)
- Seating arrangements: Yes
- Sleeping arrangements: Yes
- Auto-rack arrangements: Upper
- Catering facilities: No
- Observation facilities: Saffron-grey
- Entertainment facilities: Electric outlets; Reading lights; Bottle holder
- Other facilities: CCTV cameras; Bio-vacuum toilets; Foot-operated water taps; Passenger information system

Technical
- Rolling stock: Modified LHB coaches
- Track gauge: Indian gauge
- Electrification: 25 kV 50 Hz AC overhead line
- Operating speed: 65 km (40 mi) (Avg.)
- Track owner: Indian Railways
- Rake maintenance: Banaras (BNRS)
- Rake sharing: No

The 22588/22587 Banaras–Sealdah Amrit Bharat Express is India's 24th Non-AC Superfast Amrit Bharat Express train, which runs across the states of Uttar Pradesh, Bihar, Jharkhand and West Bengal by connecting Banaras, the Holy Ganga pilgrims city in Uttar Pradesh with Sealdah, in the city of Kolkata.

The express train was inaugurated on 18 January 2026 by Honb'le Prime Minister Shri Narendra Modi through video conference.

== Overview ==
The train is operated by Indian Railways, connecting Banaras and Sealdah. It is currently operated 22588/22587 on weekly basis.

== Rakes ==
It is the 24th Amrit Bharat 2.0 Express train in which the locomotives were designed by Chittaranjan Locomotive Works (CLW) at Chittaranjan, West Bengal and the coaches were designed and manufactured by the Integral Coach Factory at Perambur, Chennai under the Make in India initiative.

== Schedule ==
22587 / 22588 Sealdah–Banaras Amrit Bharat Express
| Train type | Amrit Bharat Express |
| Distance | 773 km |
| Average speed | ~65 km/h |
| Journey time (SDAH → BNRS) | 11 hours 50 minutes |
| Journey time (BNRS → SDAH) | 11 hours 45 minutes |
| Classes | Sleeper (SL) |
| Unreserved classes | General (GEN), Persons with Disabilities (PWD) |
| Operating days | SDAH → BNRS: Monday, Wednesday, Saturday; BNRS → SDAH: Tuesday, Friday, Sunday |
| Railway zone | North Eastern Railway |

== Route & halts ==
Sealdah–Banaras Amrit Bharat Express :
| Sr. | 22587 Sealdah–Banaras | | | | 22588 Banaras–Sealdah | | | |
| Sr. | Station | Day | Arr. | Dep. | Station | Day | Arr. | Dep. |
|---|---|---|---|---|---|---|---|---|
| 1 | Sealdah | 1 | SRC | 19:30 | Banaras | 1 | SRC | 22:10 |
| 2 | Durgapur | 1 | 21:19 | 21:21 | Pt. Deen Dayal Upadhyaya Junction | 1 | 23:10 | 23:15 |
| 3 | Asansol Junction | 1 | 21:42 | 21:45 | Patna Junction | 2 | 01:58 | 02:05 |
| 4 | Madhupur Junction | 1 | 22:35 | 22:37 | Jasidih Junction | 2 | 05:00 | 05:02 |
| 5 | Jasidih Junction | 1 | 22:56 | 22:58 | Madhupur Junction | 2 | 05:19 | 05:21 |
| 6 | Patna Junction | 2 | 02:43 | 02:50 | Asansol Junction | 2 | 06:17 | 06:20 |
| 7 | Pt. Deen Dayal Upadhyaya Junction | 2 | 06:10 | 06:15 | Durgapur | 2 | 06:43 | 06:45 |
| 8 | Banaras | 2 | 07:20 | DSTN | Sealdah | 2 | 09:55 | DSTN |

== Rake reversal ==
No rake reversal or rake share.

== See also ==
- Amrit Bharat Express
- Vande Bharat Express
- Rajdhani Express
- Sealdah railway station
- Banaras railway station

== Notes ==
a. Runs 3 day in a week with both directions.
