= Gorakhpur–Bandra Terminus Amrit Bharat Express =

Amrit Bharat Express train route in India

Gorakhpur – Bandra Terminus Amrit Bharat Express

Overview
- Service type: Amrit Bharat Express, Superfast
- Status: Active
- Locale: Uttar Pradesh, Rajasthan, Madhya Pradesh, Gujarat and Maharashtra
- First service: 28 August 2026; 2 months ago
- Current operator: North Eastern Railways (NER)

Route
- Termini: Gorakhpur Junction (GKP); Bandra Terminus (BDTS)
- Stops: 22
- Distance travelled: 1,842 km (1,145 mi)
- Average journey time: 34 hrs 10 mins
- Service frequency: Weekly
- Train number: 15085/15086
- Lines used: Gorakhpur–Kanpur line; Tundla–Agra Fort line; Bayana–Gangapur–Kota line; Kota–Ratlam–Vadodara line; Towards (Bandra Terminus)

On-board services
- Classes: Sleeper class coach (SL); General unreserved coach (GS)
- Seating arrangements: Yes
- Sleeping arrangements: Yes
- Auto-rack arrangements: Upper
- Catering facilities: No
- Observation facilities: Saffron-grey
- Entertainment facilities: Electric outlets; Reading lights; Bottle holder
- Other facilities: CCTV cameras; Bio-vacuum toilets; Foot-operated water taps; Passenger information system

Technical
- Rolling stock: Modified LHB coaches
- Track gauge: Indian gauge
- Electrification: 25 kV 50 Hz AC overhead line
- Operating speed: 57 km (35 mi) (Avg.)
- Track owner: Indian Railways
- Rake maintenance: Gorakhpur Junction (GKP)
- Rake sharing: No
Route map
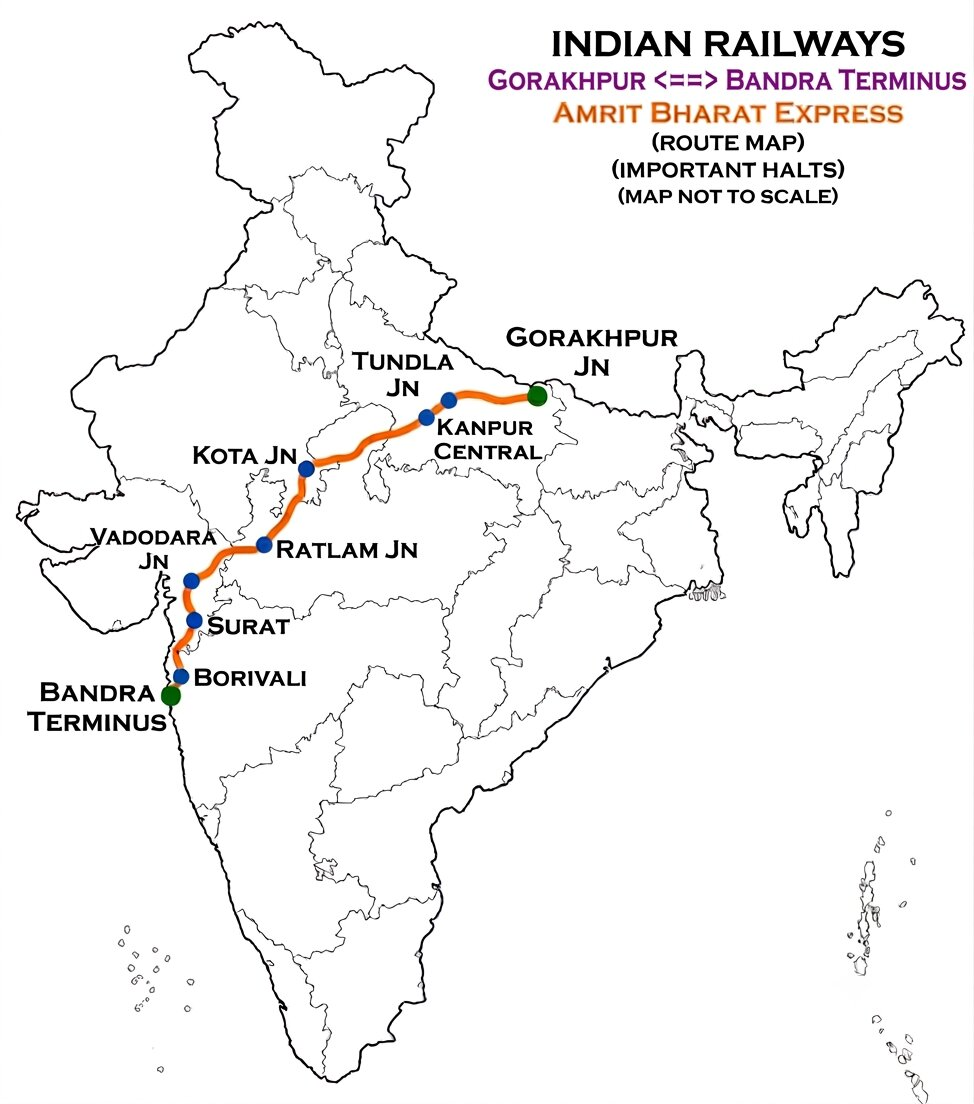

The 15085/15086 Gorakhpur–Bandra Terminus Amrit Bharat Express is India's 43rd Non-AC Superfast Amrit Bharat Express train, which runs across the states of Uttar Pradesh, Rajasthan, Madhya Pradesh, Gujarat and Maharashtra by connecting Gorakhpur Junction of Gorakhpur, the city of Gorakhnath Temple in Uttar Pradesh with Bandra Terminus of Mumbai, the financial capital of Maharashtra.

The express train was inaugurated on 28 August 2026 by Honorable Prime Minister Narendra Modi through video conference.

== Overview ==
The train is operated by Indian Railways, connecting Gorakhpur Junction and Bandra Terminus. It is currently operated 15085/15086 on weekly basis.

== Rakes ==
It is the 43rd Amrit Bharat 2.0 Express train in which the locomotives were designed by Chittaranjan Locomotive Works (CLW) at Chittaranjan, West Bengal and the coaches were designed and manufactured by the Integral Coach Factory at Perambur, Chennai under the Make in India Initiative.

== Schedule ==
Train Schedule: Gorakhpur ↔ Bandra Terminus Amrit Bharat Express
Train No.	Station Code	Departure Station	Departure Time	Departure Day	Arrival Station	Arrival Hours	Journey Time
15085	GKP	Gorakhpur Junction	07:50 AM	Friday	Bandra Terminus	05:45 PM	33h 55m
15086	BDTS	Bandra Terminus	09:45 PM	Saturday	Gorakhpur Junction	06:45 AM	33h 00m

== Routes and halts ==
The important halts of the train are :

- Gorakhpur Junction
- Khalilabad
- Basti
- Gonda Junction
- Badshahnagar
- Aishbagh
- Kanpur Central
- Tundla Junction
- Agra Fort
- Bayana Junction
- Gangapur City Junction
- Kota Junction
- Bhawani Mandi
- Shamgarh
- Ratlam Junction
- Vadodara Junction
- Surat
- Valsad
- Vapi
- Palghar
- Borivali
- Bandra Terminus

== Rake reversal or rake share ==
No rake reversal or rake share.

== See also ==
- Amrit Bharat Express
- Vande Bharat Sleeper Express
- Vande Bharat Express
- Uday Express
- Humsafar Express

== Notes ==
a. Runs a day in a week with both directions.
