= Charlapalli–Gorakhpur Amrit Bharat Express =

Amrit Bharat Express train route in India

Charlapalli – Gorakhpur Amrit Bharat Express

Overview
- Service type: Amrit Bharat Express, Superfast
- Status: Active
- Locale: Telangana, Maharashtra, Madhya Pradesh and Uttar Pradesh
- First service: 2 October 2026; 29 days ago
- Current operator: South Central Railways (SCR)

Route
- Termini: Charlapalli (CHZ); Gorakhpur Junction (GKP)
- Stops: 21
- Distance travelled: 1,811 km (1,125 mi)
- Average journey time: 32 hrs 40 mins
- Service frequency: Weekly
- Train number: 22075/22076
- Lines used: Charlapalli–Kazipet–Nagpur line; Nagpur–Bhopal line; Bhopal–Jhansi line; Jhansi–Kanpur line; Lucknow–Gorakhpur line

On-board services
- Classes: Sleeper class coach (SL); General unreserved coach (GS)
- Seating arrangements: Yes
- Sleeping arrangements: Yes
- Auto-rack arrangements: Upper
- Catering facilities: No
- Observation facilities: Saffron-grey
- Entertainment facilities: Electric outlets; Reading lights; Bottle holder
- Other facilities: CCTV cameras; Bio-vacuum toilets; Foot-operated water taps; Passenger information system

Technical
- Rolling stock: Modified LHB coaches
- Track gauge: Indian gauge
- Electrification: 25 kV 50 Hz AC overhead line
- Operating speed: 55 km (34 mi) (Avg.)
- Track owner: Indian Railways
- Rake maintenance: Charlapalli (CHZ)
- Rake sharing: Yes
Route map
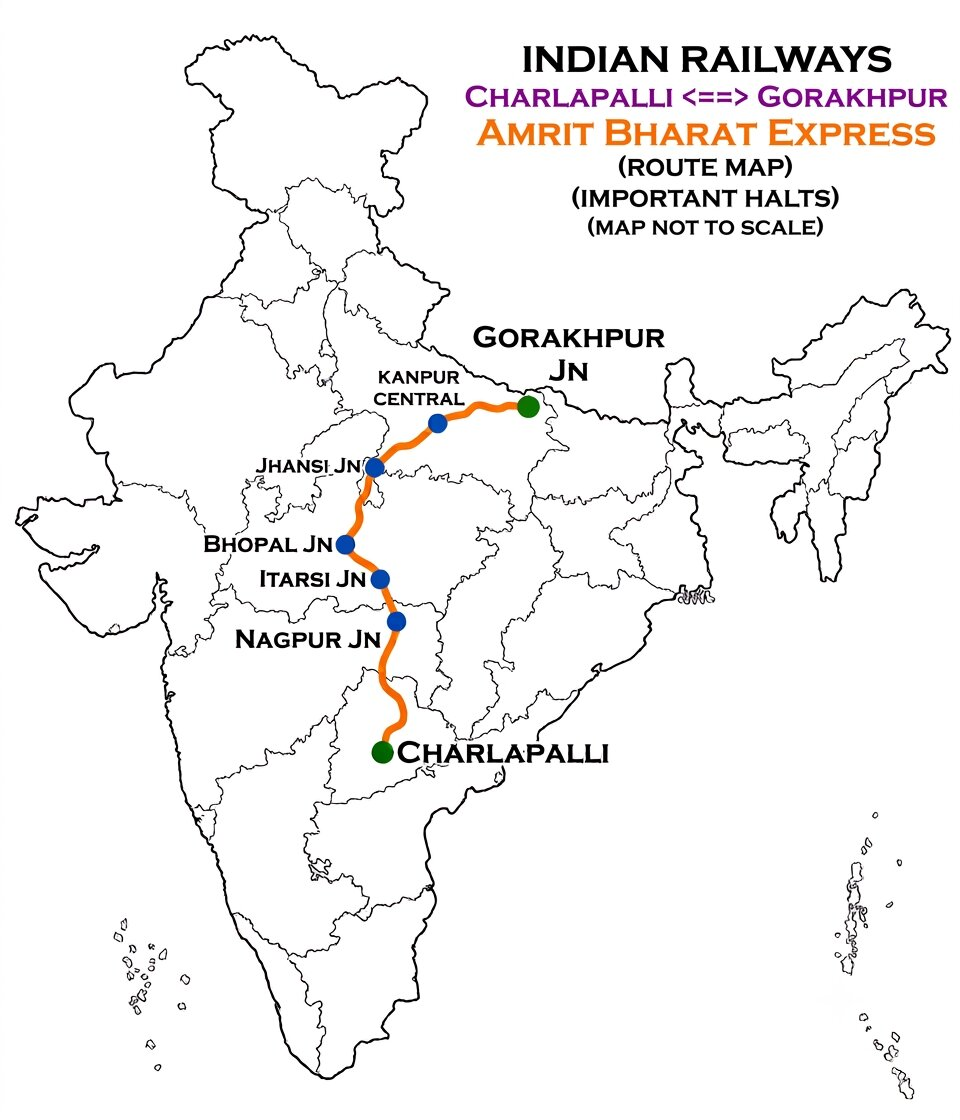

The 22075/22076 Charlapalli–Gorakhpur Amrit Bharat Express is India's 44th Non-AC Superfast Amrit Bharat Express train, which runs across the states of Telangana, Maharashtra, Madhya Pradesh and Uttar Pradesh by connecting Charlapalli of Hyderabad, the City of Pearls in Telangana with Gorakhpur Junction of Gorakhpur, the city of Gorakhnath Temple in Uttar Pradesh.

The express train was inaugurated on 2 October 2026 by Honorable Prime Minister Narendra Modi through video conference.

== Overview ==
The train is operated by Indian Railways, connecting Charlapalli and Gorakhpur Junction. It is currently operated 22075/22076 on weekly basis.

== Rakes ==
It is the 44th Amrit Bharat 2.0 Express train in which the locomotives were designed by Chittaranjan Locomotive Works (CLW) at Chittaranjan, West Bengal and the coaches were designed and manufactured by the Integral Coach Factory at Perambur, Chennai under the Make in India Initiative.

== Schedule ==
Train Schedule: Charlapalli ↔ Gorakhpur Amrit Bharat Express
Train No.	Station Code	Departure Station	Departure Time	Departure Day	Arrival Station	Arrival Hours
22075	CHZ	Charlapalli	08:00 PM	Gorakhpur Junction	03:30 AM	32h 40m
22076	GKP	Gorakhpur Junction	08:30 AM	Charlapalli	05:00 PM	32h 30m

== Routes and halts ==
The important halts of the train are :

- Charlapalli
- Kazipet Junction
- Peddapalli Junction
- Mancherial
- Balharshah
- Chandrapur
- Nagpur Junction
- Betul
- Itarsi Junction
- Bhopal Junction
- Bina Junction
- Jhansi Junction
- Orai
- Pokhrayan
- Kanpur Central
- Aishbagh
- Lucknow City
- Gomti Nagar
- Barabanki Junction
- Gonda Junction
- Gorakhpur Junction

== Rake reversal or rake share ==
The rake sharing with Charlapalli – Thiruvananthapuram North Amrit Bharat Express (17041/17042).

== See also ==
- Amrit Bharat Express
- Vande Bharat Sleeper Express
- Vande Bharat Express
- Uday Express
- Humsafar Express

== Notes ==
a. Runs a day in a week with both directions.
