= Gaya–Delhi Junction Amrit Bharat Express =

Amrit Bharat Express train route in India

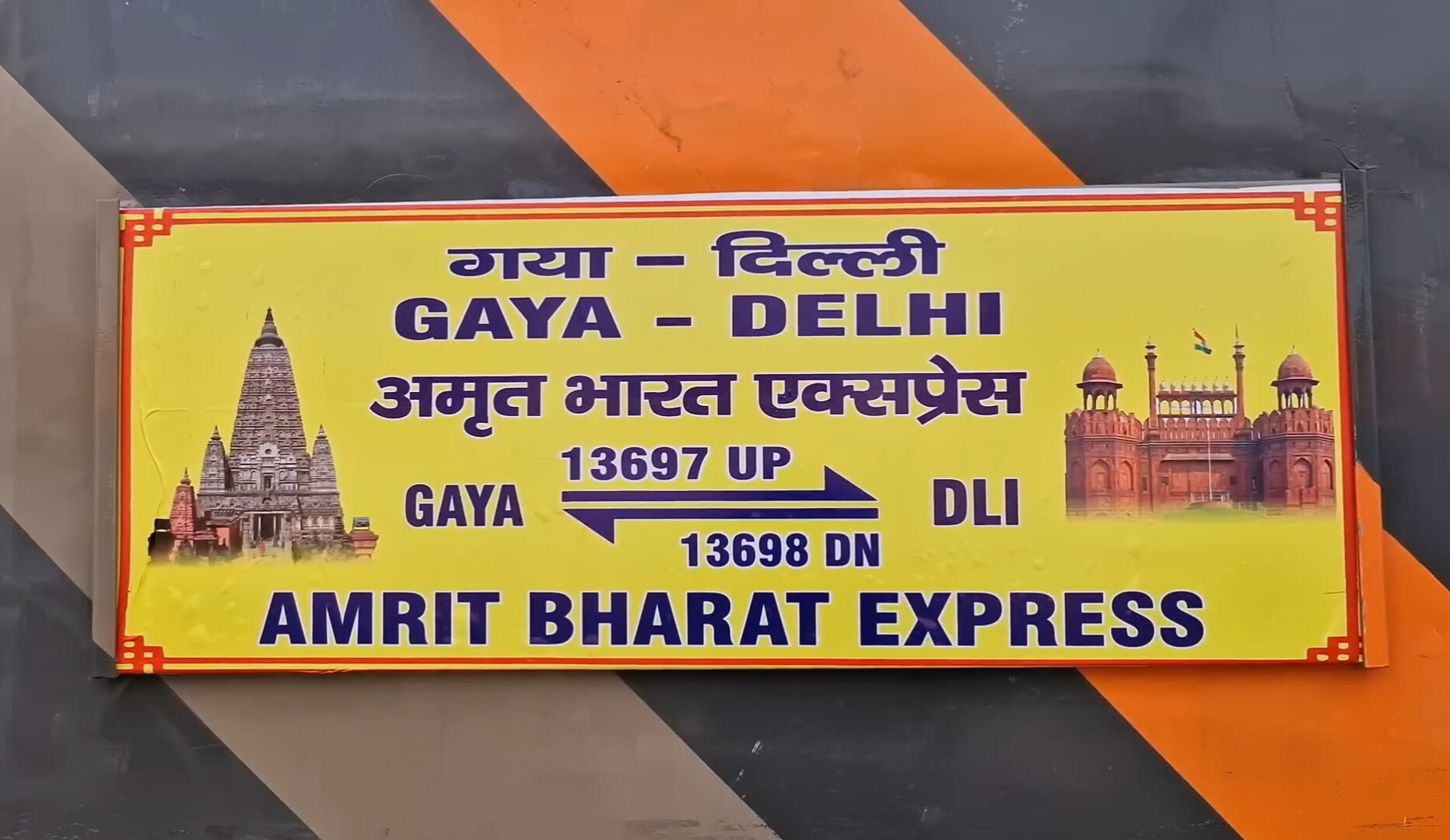

Overview
- Service type: Amrit Bharat Express, Superfast
- Status: Operating (Active)
- Locale: Bihar, Uttar Pradesh and New Delhi
- First service: 22 August 2025 (Inaugural); 28 August 2025; 11 months ago (Commercial)
- Current operator: East Central Railways (ECR)

Route
- Termini: Gaya Junction (GAYA); Delhi Junction (DLI)
- Stops: 11
- Distance travelled: 985 km (612 mi)
- Average journey time: 19 hrs 30 mins
- Service frequency: Bi-weekly
- Train number: 13697/13698
- Lines used: Gaya–Pt. Deen Dayal Upadhyaya line; Pt. Deen Dayal Upadhyaya–Kanpur line; Kanpur–Delhi section

On-board services
- Class: Sleeper class coach (SL) General unreserved coach (GS)
- Seating arrangements: Yes
- Sleeping arrangements: Yes
- Auto-rack arrangements: Upper
- Catering facilities: On-board catering
- Observation facilities: Saffron-grey
- Entertainment facilities: Electric outlets; Reading lights; Bottle holder
- Other facilities: CCTV cameras; Bio-vacuum toilets; Foot-operated water taps; Passenger information system

Technical
- Rolling stock: Modified LHB coaches
- Track gauge: Indian gauge
- Electrification: 25 kV 50 Hz AC overhead line
- Operating speed: 51 km (32 mi) (Avg.)
- Track owner: Indian Railways
- Rake sharing: No

The 13697/13698 Gaya–Delhi Junction Amrit Bharat Express is India's 9th Non-AC Superfast Amrit Bharat Express train, which currently runs across the states of Bihar, Uttar Pradesh and New Delhi, the capital city of India.

The express train was inaugurated on 22 August 2025 by Honorable Prime Minister Narendra Modi through video conference.

== Overview ==
The train is operated by Indian Railways, connecting Gaya Junction and Old Delhi Junction. It is currently operated with train numbers 13697/13698 on bi-weekly services

== Rakes ==
It is the 9th Amrit Bharat 2.0 Express train in which the locomotives were designed by Chittaranjan Locomotive Works (CLW) at Chittaranjan, West Bengal and the coaches were designed and manufactured by the Integral Coach Factory at Perambur, Chennai under the Make in India initiative.

== Services ==
The 13697/13698 Gaya–Delhi Junction Amrit Bharat Express currently operates 2 days in a week, covering a distance of 985 km (612 mi) in a travel time of 19 hrs 30 mins with an average speed of 51 km/h (31.6 mph). The Maximum Permissible Speed (MPS) is 130 km/h (81 mph).

== Routes and halts ==
The halts for this 13697/13698 Gaya–Delhi Junction Amrit Bharat Express are as follows :

1. Gaya Junction
2. Anugraha Narayan Road
3. Dehri On Sone
4. Sasaram Junction
5. Bhabua Road
6. Pt. Deen Dayal Upadhyaya Junction
7. Subedarganj
8. Govindpuri
9. Tundla Junction
10. Ghaziabad Junction
11. Old Delhi Junction

== Rake reversal ==
There is no rake reversal or rake share.

== See also ==
- Amrit Bharat Express
- Vande Bharat Express
- Tejas Express
- Duronto Express
- Gaya Junction railway station
- Delhi Junction railway station

== Notes ==
a. 13697 – Sunday & Thursday | 13698 – Monday & Friday
