= Gorakhpur–Delhi Junction Amrit Bharat Express =

Amrit Bharat Express train route in India

Gorakhpur – Delhi Junction Amrit Bharat Express

Overview
- Service type: Amrit Bharat Express, Superfast
- Status: Active
- Locale: Uttar Pradesh and Delhi
- First service: 27 August 2026; 54 days ago
- Current operator: North Eastern Railways (NER)

Route
- Termini: Gorakhpur Junction (GKP); Delhi Junction (DLI)
- Stops: 10
- Distance travelled: 724 km (450 mi)
- Average journey time: 14 hrs 05 mins
- Service frequency: Weekly
- Train number: 15095/15096
- Lines used: Gorakhpur–Gonda line; Gonda–Sitapur–Bareilly line; Moradabad–Ghaziabad–Delhi line

On-board services
- Classes: Sleeper class coach (SL); General unreserved coach (GS)
- Seating arrangements: Yes
- Sleeping arrangements: Yes
- Auto-rack arrangements: Upper
- Catering facilities: No
- Observation facilities: Saffron-grey
- Entertainment facilities: Electric outlets; Reading lights; Bottle holder
- Other facilities: CCTV cameras; Bio-vacuum toilets; Foot-operated water taps; Passenger information system

Technical
- Rolling stock: Modified LHB coaches
- Track gauge: Indian gauge
- Electrification: 25 kV 50 Hz AC overhead line
- Operating speed: 51 km (32 mi) (Avg.)
- Track owner: Indian Railways
- Rake maintenance: Gorakhpur Junction (GKP)
- Rake sharing: No
Route map
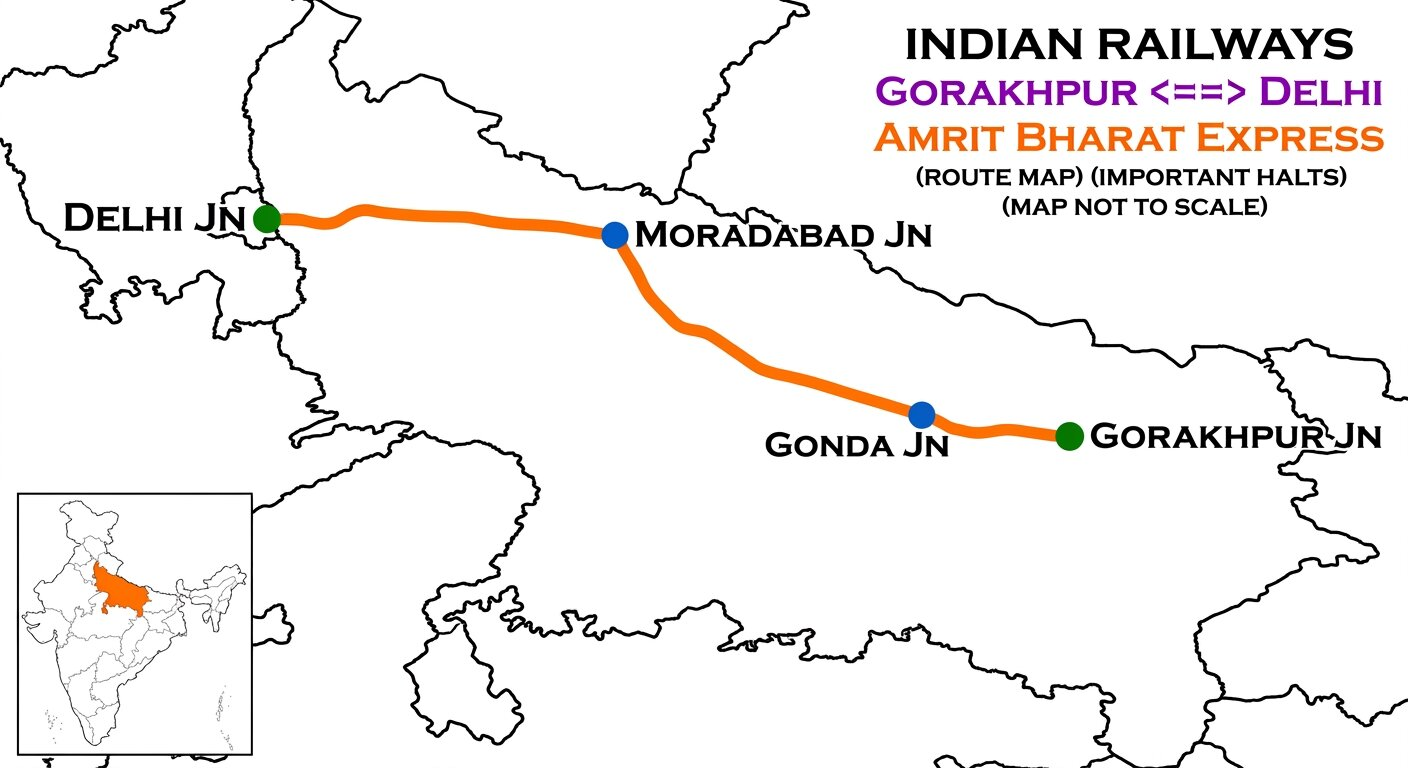

The 15095/15096 Gorakhpur–Delhi Junction Amrit Bharat Express is India's 42nd Non-AC Superfast Amrit Bharat Express train, which runs across the states of Uttar Pradesh and New Delhi by connecting Gorakhpur Junction of Gorakhpur, the city of Gorakhnath Temple in Uttar Pradesh with Delhi Junction of Delhi, the national capital of India.

The express train is inaugurated on 2026 by Honorable Prime Minister Narendra Modi through video conference.

== Overview ==
The train is operated by Indian Railways, connecting Gorakhpur Junction and Delhi Junction. It is currently operated 15095/15096 on weekly basis.

== Rakes ==
It is the 42nd Amrit Bharat 2.0 Express train in which the locomotives were designed by Chittaranjan Locomotive Works (CLW) at Chittaranjan, West Bengal and the coaches were designed and manufactured by the Integral Coach Factory at Perambur, Chennai under the Make in India Initiative.

== Schedule ==
Train Schedule: Gorakhpur ↔ Delhi Junction Amrit Bharat Express
Train No.	Station Code	Departure Station	Departure Time	Departure Day	Arrival Station	Arrival Hours
15095	GKP	Gorakhpur Junction	10:45 PM	Delhi Junction	12:50 PM	14h 05m
15096	DLI	Delhi Junction	2:00 PM	Gorakhpur Junction	06:30 AM	16h 30m

== Routes and halts ==
The important halts of the train are :

- Gorakhpur Junction
- Khalilabad
- Basti
- Gonda Junction
- Burhwal Junction
- Sitapur Junction
- Bareilly Junction
- Moradabad Junction
- Ghaziabad Junction
- Delhi Junction

== Rake reversal or rake share ==
No rake reversal or rake share.

== See also ==
- Amrit Bharat Express
- Vande Bharat Sleeper Express
- Vande Bharat Express
- Uday Express
- Humsafar Express

== Notes ==
a. Runs a day in a week with both directions.
