= Howrah–Anand Vihar Terminal Amrit Bharat Express =

Amrit Bharat Express train route in India

Howrah – Anand Vihar Terminal Amrit Bharat Express
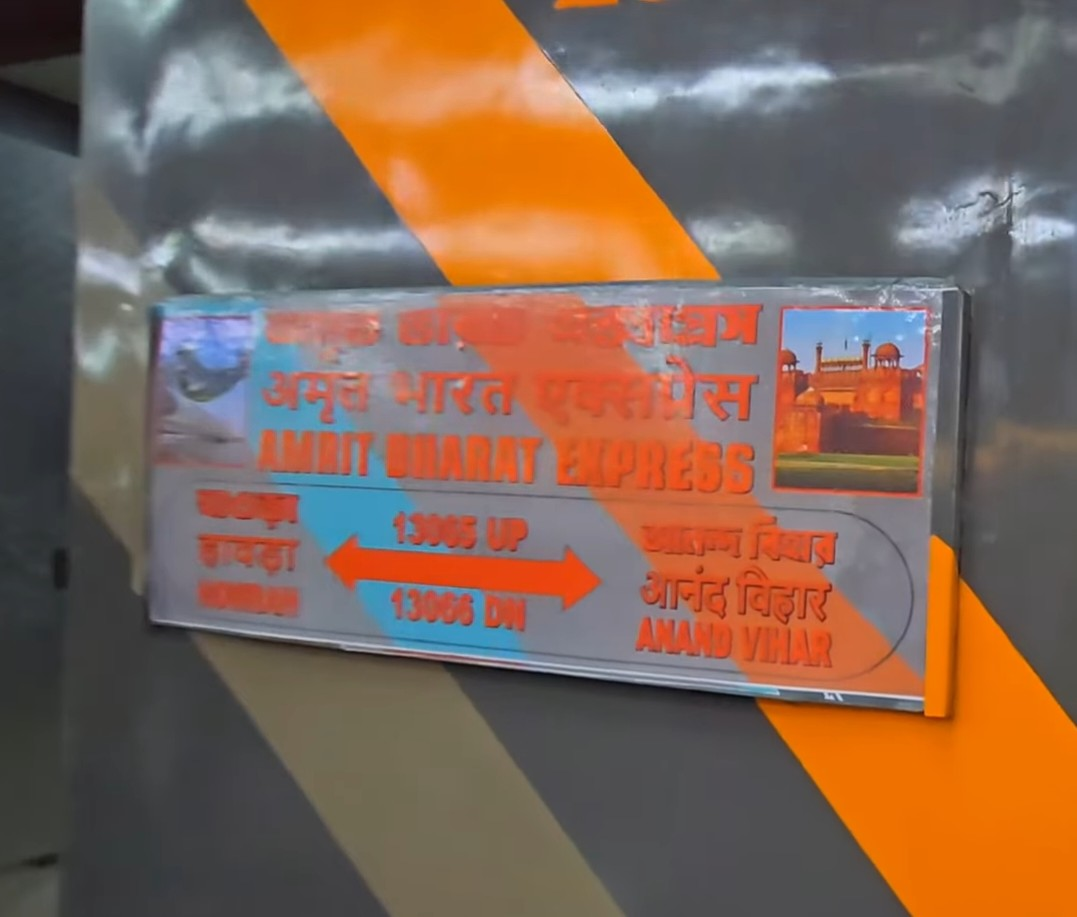

Overview
- Service type: Amrit Bharat Express, Superfast
- Status: Active
- Locale: West Bengal, Jharkhand, Bihar, Uttar Pradesh and New Delhi
- First service: 18 January 2026; 9 months ago (Inaugural); 22 January 2026; 8 months ago (Commercial)
- Current operator: Eastern Railways (ER)

Route
- Termini: Howrah Junction (HWH); Anand Vihar Terminal (ANVT)
- Stops: 27
- Distance travelled: 1,455 km (904 mi)
- Average journey time: 27 hrs 40 mins
- Service frequency: Weekly
- Train number: 13065/13066
- Lines used: Howrah–Gaya line (Towards Barddhaman Junction, Asansol Junction ); Gaya–Pt. Deen Dayal Upadhyaya line; Varanasi–Sultanpur–Lucknow line; Lucknow–Moradabad line; Hapur–Ghaziabad–Anand Vihar

On-board services
- Class: Sleeper class coach (SL) General unreserved coach (GS)
- Seating arrangements: Yes
- Sleeping arrangements: Yes
- Auto-rack arrangements: Upper
- Catering facilities: On-board catering
- Observation facilities: Saffron-grey
- Entertainment facilities: Electric outlets; Reading lights; Bottle holder
- Other facilities: CCTV cameras; Bio-vacuum toilets; Foot-operated water taps; Passenger information system

Technical
- Rolling stock: Modified LHB coaches
- Track gauge: Indian gauge
- Electrification: 25 kV 50 Hz AC overhead line
- Operating speed: 65 km (40 mi) (Avg.)
- Track owner: Indian Railways
- Rake sharing: No

The 13065/13066 Howrah–Anand Vihar Terminal Amrit Bharat Express is India's 23rd Non-AC Superfast Amrit Bharat Express train, which runs across the states of West Bengal, Jharkhand, Bihar, Uttar Pradesh and New Delhi by connecting the oldest largest station city Howrah Junction with Anand Vihar Terminal, the Modern Gateway of National capital New Delhi in India.

The express train is inaugurated on 18 January 2026 by Honorable Prime Minister Narendra Modi through video conference.

== Overview ==
The train is operated by Indian Railways, connecting Howrah Junction and Anand Vihar Terminal. It is currently operated 13065/13066 on weekly basis.

== Rakes ==
It is the 23rd Amrit Bharat 2.0 Express train in which the locomotives were designed by Chittaranjan Locomotive Works (CLW) at Chittaranjan, West Bengal and the coaches were designed and manufactured by the Integral Coach Factory at Perambur, Chennai under the Make in India initiative.

== Schedule ==
Train schedule: Howrah ↔ Anand Vihar Terminal Amrit Bharat Express
Train no.	Station code	Departure station	Departure time	Departure day	Arrival station	Arrival hours
13065	HWH	Howrah Junction	11:10 PM	Anand Vihar Terminal	2:50 AM	27h 0m
13066	ANVT	Anand Vihar Terminal	5:15 AM	Howrah Junction	10:50 AM	29h 35m

== Routes and halts ==
The halts for this 13065/13066 Howrah – Anand Vihar Terminal Amrit Bharat Express are as follows:-

1. Howrah Junction
2. Bandel Junction
3. Barddhaman Junction
4. Durgapur
5. Asansol Junction
6. Dhanbad Junction
7. NSCB Junction Gomoh Jn
8. Parasnath
9. Koderma Junction
10. Gaya Junction
11. Anugraha Narayan Road
12. Dehri-on-Sone
13. Sasaram Junction
14. Bhabua Road
15. Pandit Deen Dayal Upadhyaya Junction
16. Varanasi Junction
17. Jaunpur City
18. Sultanpur Junction
19. Maharaja Bijli Pasi
20. Lucknow Charbagh
21. Shahjahanpur
22. Bareilly Junction
23. Moradabad Junction
24. Gajraula Junction
25. Hapur Junction
26. Ghaziabad Junction
27. Anand Vihar Terminal

== Rake reversal ==
No rake reversal or rake share.

== See also ==
- Amrit Bharat Express
- Vande Bharat Express
- Rajdhani Express
- Howrah Junction
- Anand Vihar Terminal
- Panvel–Alipurduar Amrit Bharat Express

== Notes ==
a. Runs a day in a week with both directions.
