= Dhanbad–Coimbatore Amrit Bharat Express =

Amrit Bharat Express train route in India

Dhanbad – Coimbatore Amrit Bharat Express

Overview
- Service type: Amrit Bharat Express, Superfast
- Status: Active
- Locale: Jharkhand, Bihar, Uttar Pradesh, Madhya Pradesh, Maharashtra, Andhra Pradesh and Tamil Nadu
- First service: 22 August 2026; 41 days ago
- Current operator: East Central Railways (ECR)

Route
- Termini: Dhanbad Junction (DHN); Coimbatore Junction (CBE)
- Stops: 41
- Distance travelled: 2,976 km (1,849 mi)
- Average journey time: 50 hrs 20 mins
- Service frequency: Weekly
- Train number: 22363/22364
- Lines used: Dhanbad–Gaya line; Gaya–Pt. Deen Dayal Upadhyaya line; Prayagraj Chheoki–Jabalpur line; Jabalpur–Itarsi line; Itarsi–Gudur line Towards (Nagpur Junction), (Balharshah), (Khammam), (Vijayawada Junction); Gudur–Katpadi line Towards (Renigunta Junction); Jolarpettai–Coimbatore line Towards (Salem Junction), (Erode Junction)

On-board services
- Classes: Sleeper class coach (SL); General unreserved coach (GS)
- Seating arrangements: Yes
- Sleeping arrangements: Yes
- Auto-rack arrangements: Upper
- Catering facilities: No
- Observation facilities: Saffron-grey
- Entertainment facilities: Electric outlets; Reading lights; Bottle holder
- Other facilities: CCTV cameras; Bio-vacuum toilets; Foot-operated water taps; Passenger information system

Technical
- Rolling stock: Modified LHB coaches
- Track gauge: Indian gauge
- Electrification: 25 kV 50 Hz AC overhead line
- Operating speed: 59 km (37 mi) (Avg.)
- Track owner: Indian Railways
- Rake sharing: Yes
Route map
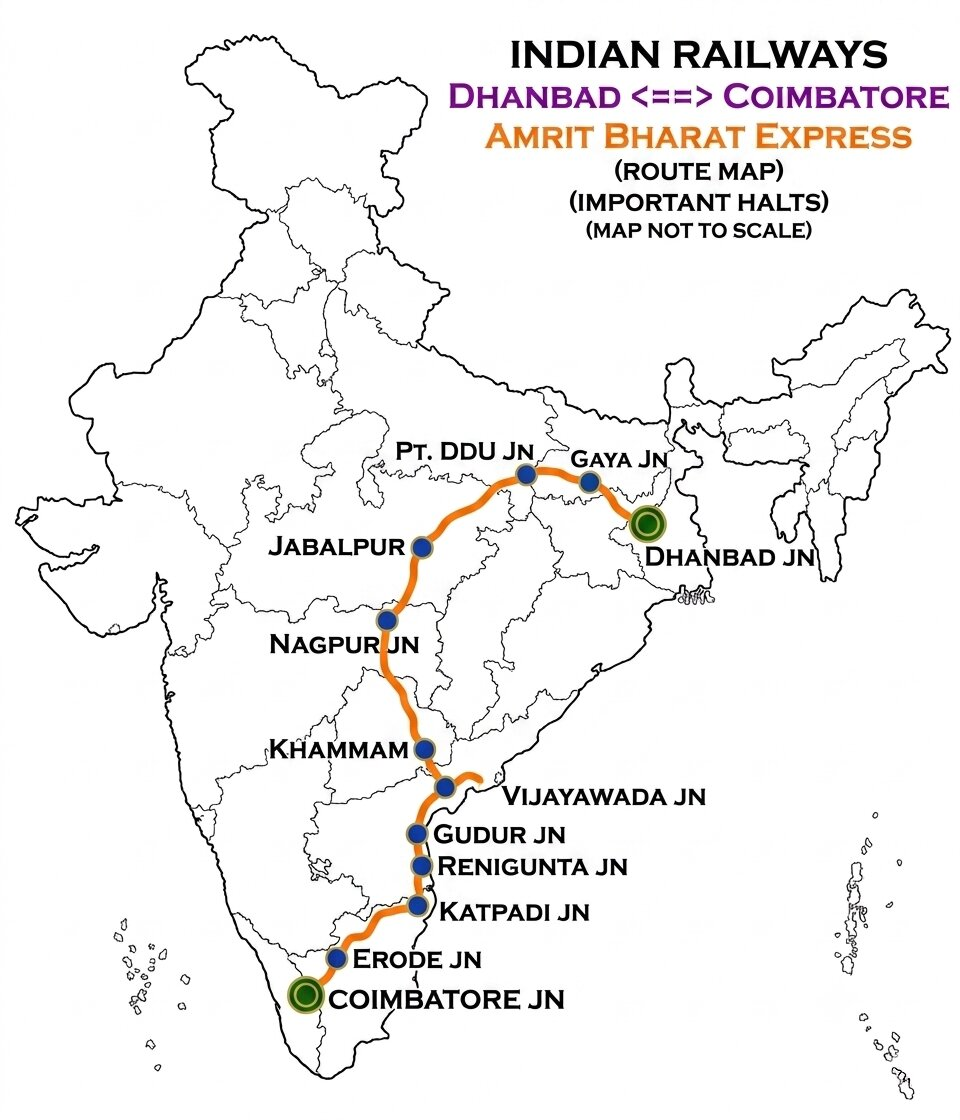

The 22363/22364 Dhanbad–Coimbatore Amrit Bharat Express is India's 38th Non-AC Superfast Amrit Bharat Express train, which runs across the states of Jharkhand, Bihar, Uttar Pradesh, Madhya Pradesh, Maharashtra, Andhra Pradesh and Tamil Nadu by connecting Dhanbad Junction of Dhanbad, the Coal capital city in Jharkhand with Coimbatore Junction of the Textile city of Coimbatore of Tamil Nadu.

The express train is inaugurated on 2026 by Prime Minister Narendra Modi through video conference.

== Overview ==
The train is operated by Indian Railways, connecting Dhanbad Junction and Coimbatore Junction. It is currently operated 22363/22364 on weekly basis.

== Rakes ==
It is the 38th Amrit Bharat 2.0 Express train in which the locomotives were designed by Chittaranjan Locomotive Works (CLW) at Chittaranjan, West Bengal and the coaches were designed and manufactured by the Integral Coach Factory at Perambur, Chennai under the Make in India Initiative.

== Schedule ==
Train Schedule: Dhanbad ↔ Coimbatore Amrit Bharat Express
Train No.	Station Code	Departure Station	Departure Time	Arrival Station	Arrival Time	Total Duration
22363	DHN	Dhanbad Junction	04:10 PM	Coimbatore Junction	06:30 PM	50h 20m
22364	CBE	Coimbatore Junction	07:50 AM	Dhanbad Junction	01:00 PM	53h 10m

== Routes and halts ==
The Important Halts of the train are:

- Dhanbad Junction
- NCSB Gomoh
- Parasnath
- Hazaribagh Road
- Koderma Junction
- Gaya Junction
- Anugraha Narayan Road
- Dehri-on-Sone
- Sasaram
- Bhabua Road
- Pt. Deen Dayal Upadhyaya Junction
- Mirzapur
- Prayagraj Chheoki Junction
- Satna Junction
- Katni Junction
- Jabalpur Junction
- Narsinghpur
- Pipariya
- Itarsi Junction
- Betul
- Nagpur Junction
- Chandrapur
- Balharshah
- Sirpur Kaghaznagar
- Mancherial
- Peddapalli Junction
- Warangal
- Mahabubabad
- Khammam
- Vijayawada Junction
- Ongole
- Nellore
- Gudur Junction
- Renigunta Junction
- Tiruttani
- Katpadi Junction
- Jolarpettai Junction
- Salem Junction
- Erode Junction
- Tiruppur
- Coimbatore Junction

== See also ==
- Amrit Bharat Express
- Vande Bharat Sleeper Express
- Vande Bharat Express
- Uday Express
- Humsafar Express

== Notes ==
a. Runs a day in a week with both directions.
