= Pune–Danapur Amrit Bharat Express =

Amrit Bharat Express train route in India

Pune – Danapur Amrit Bharat Express

Overview
- Service type: Amrit Bharat Express, Superfast
- Status: Active
- Locale: Maharashtra, Madhya Pradesh, Uttar Pradesh and Bihar
- First service: 17 June 2026; 2 months ago (Inaugural); 27 June 2026; 59 days ago (Commercial)
- Current operator: Central Railways (CR)

Route
- Termini: Pune Junction (PUNE); Danapur (DNR)
- Stops: 21
- Distance travelled: 1,748 km (1,086 mi)
- Average journey time: 34 hrs 05 mins
- Service frequency: Weekly
- Train number: 11431/11432
- Lines used: Pune–Daund–Manmad line; Manmad–Bhusawal line; Bhusaval–Jabalpur line; Jabalpur–Prayagraj Chheoki line; Prayagraj Chheoki–Pt. Deen Dayal Upadhyaya–Danapur line

On-board services
- Classes: Sleeper class coach (SL); General unreserved coach (GS)
- Seating arrangements: Yes
- Sleeping arrangements: Yes
- Auto-rack arrangements: Upper
- Catering facilities: No
- Observation facilities: Saffron-grey
- Entertainment facilities: Electric outlets; Reading lights; Bottle holder
- Other facilities: CCTV cameras; Bio-vacuum toilets; Foot-operated water taps; Passenger information system

Technical
- Rolling stock: Modified LHB coaches
- Track gauge: Indian gauge
- Electrification: 25 kV 50 Hz AC overhead line
- Operating speed: 60 km (37 mi) (Avg.)
- Track owner: Indian Railways
- Rake maintenance: Pune Junction (PUNE)
- Rake sharing: No
Route map
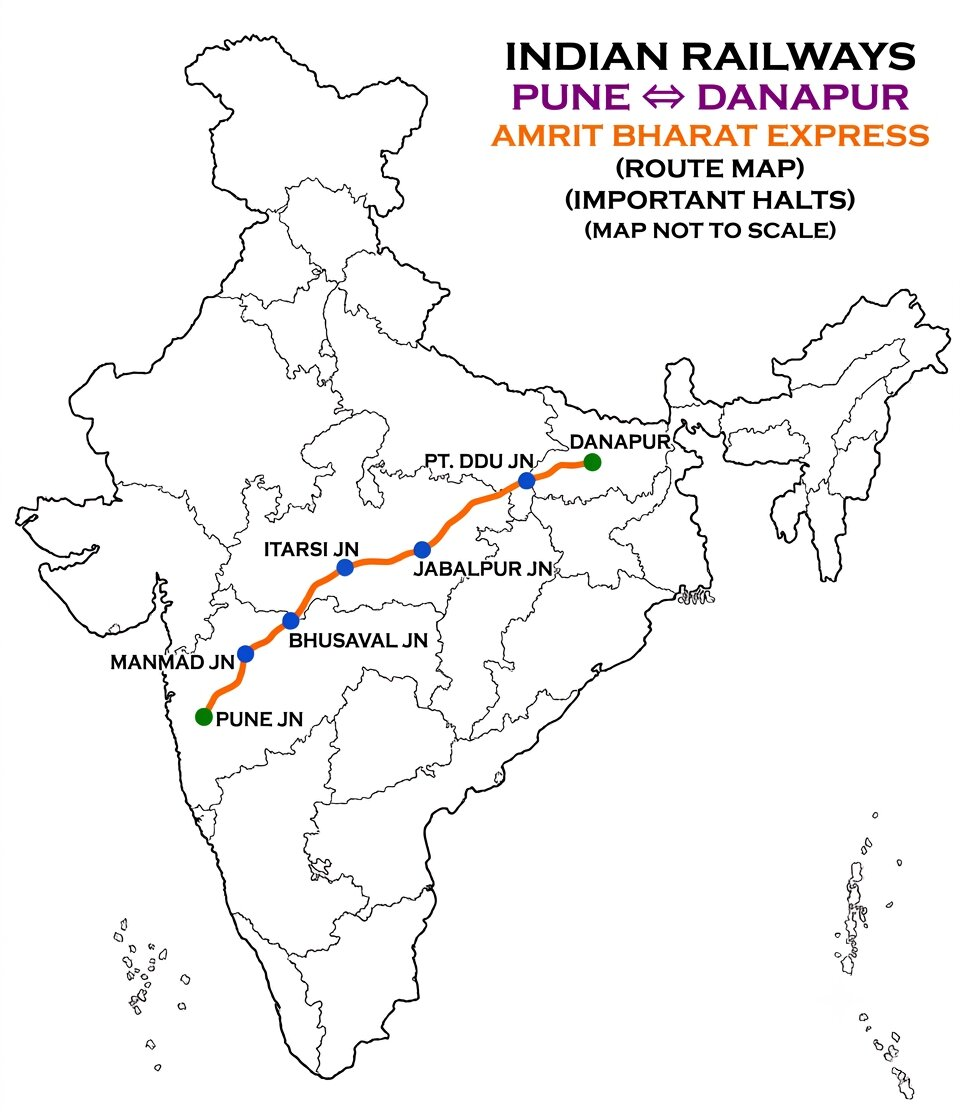

The 11431/11432 Pune–Danapur Amrit Bharat Express is India's 36th Non-AC Superfast Amrit Bharat Express train, which runs across the states of Maharashtra, Madhya Pradesh, Uttar Pradesh and Bihar by connecting Pune Junction of Pune, the Oxford of the East in Maharashtra with Danapur of Patna, the historical city in Bihar.

The express train is inaugurated on 2026 by Honorable Prime Minister Narendra Modi through video conference.

== Overview ==
The train is operated by Indian Railways, connecting Pune Junction and Danapur. It is currently operated 11431/11432 on weekly basis.

== Rakes ==
It is the 36th Amrit Bharat 2.0 Express train in which the locomotives were designed by Chittaranjan Locomotive Works (CLW) at Chittaranjan, West Bengal and the coaches were designed and manufactured by the Integral Coach Factory at Perambur, Chennai under the Make in India Initiative.

== Schedule ==
Train Schedule: Pune ↔ Danapur Amrit Bharat Express
| Train No. | Station Code | Departure Station | Departure Time | Departure Day | Arrival Station | Arrival Hours |
|---|---|---|---|---|---|---|
| 11431 | PUNE | Pune Junction | 03:25 PM | Danapur | 01:30 AM | 34h 05m |
| 11432 | DNR | Danapur | 3:30 AM | Pune Junction | 11:05 AM | 31h 35m |

== Routes and halts ==
The important halts of the train are :

- Pune Junction
- Daund Chord Line
- Ahilyanagar Junction
- Belapur (BAP)
- Kopargaon
- Manmad Junction
- Bhusaval Junction
- Khandwa Junction
- Itarsi Junction
- Pipariya
- Narsinghpur
- Jabalpur Junction
- Katni Junction
- Maihar
- Satna Junction
- Manikpur Junction
- Prayagraj Chheoki Junction
- Pt. Deen Dayal Upadhyaya Junction
- Buxar
- Ara Junction
- Danapur

== Rake reversal or rake share ==
No rake reversal or rake share.

== See also ==
- Amrit Bharat Express
- Vande Bharat Sleeper Express
- Vande Bharat Express
- Uday Express
- Humsafar Express

== Notes ==
a. Runs a day in a week with both directions.
