= Lokmanya Tilak Terminus–Ayodhya Cantonment Amrit Bharat Express =

Amrit Bharat Express train route in India

Mumbai LTT - Ayodhya Cantt Amrit Bharat Express

Overview
- Service type: Amrit Bharat Express, Superfast
- Status: Active
- Locale: Maharashtra, Madhya Pradesh and Uttar Pradesh
- First service: 28 April 2026; 34 days ago (Inaugural) 02212; 3 May 2026; 29 days ago (Commercial)
- Current operator: Central Railways (CR)

Route
- Termini: Lokmanya Tilak Terminus (LTT); Ayodhya Cantt Junction (AYC)
- Stops: 14
- Distance travelled: 1,500 km (932 mi)
- Average journey time: 26 hrs 20 mins
- Service frequency: Weekly
- Train number: 22111/22112
- Lines used: Lokmanya Tilak Terminus–Kalyan–Bhusaval line; Bhusaval–Jabalpur line; Jabalpur–Prayagraj line; Prayagraj–Sultanpur line; Sultanpur–Ayodhya Cantt

On-board services
- Class: Sleeper Class Coach (SL) General Unreserved Coach (GS)
- Seating arrangements: Yes
- Sleeping arrangements: Yes
- Auto-rack arrangements: Upper
- Catering facilities: On-board Catering
- Observation facilities: Saffron-Grey
- Entertainment facilities: Electric Outlets; Reading lights; Bottle Holder
- Other facilities: CCTV cameras; Bio-Vacuum Toilets; Foot-Operated Water Taps; Passenger information system

Technical
- Rolling stock: Modified LHB Coaches
- Track gauge: Indian gauge 1,676 mm (5 ft 6 in) broad gauge
- Electrification: 25 kV 50 Hz AC Overhead line
- Operating speed: 57 km (35 mi) (Avg.)
- Track owner: Indian Railways
- Rake sharing: No
Route map
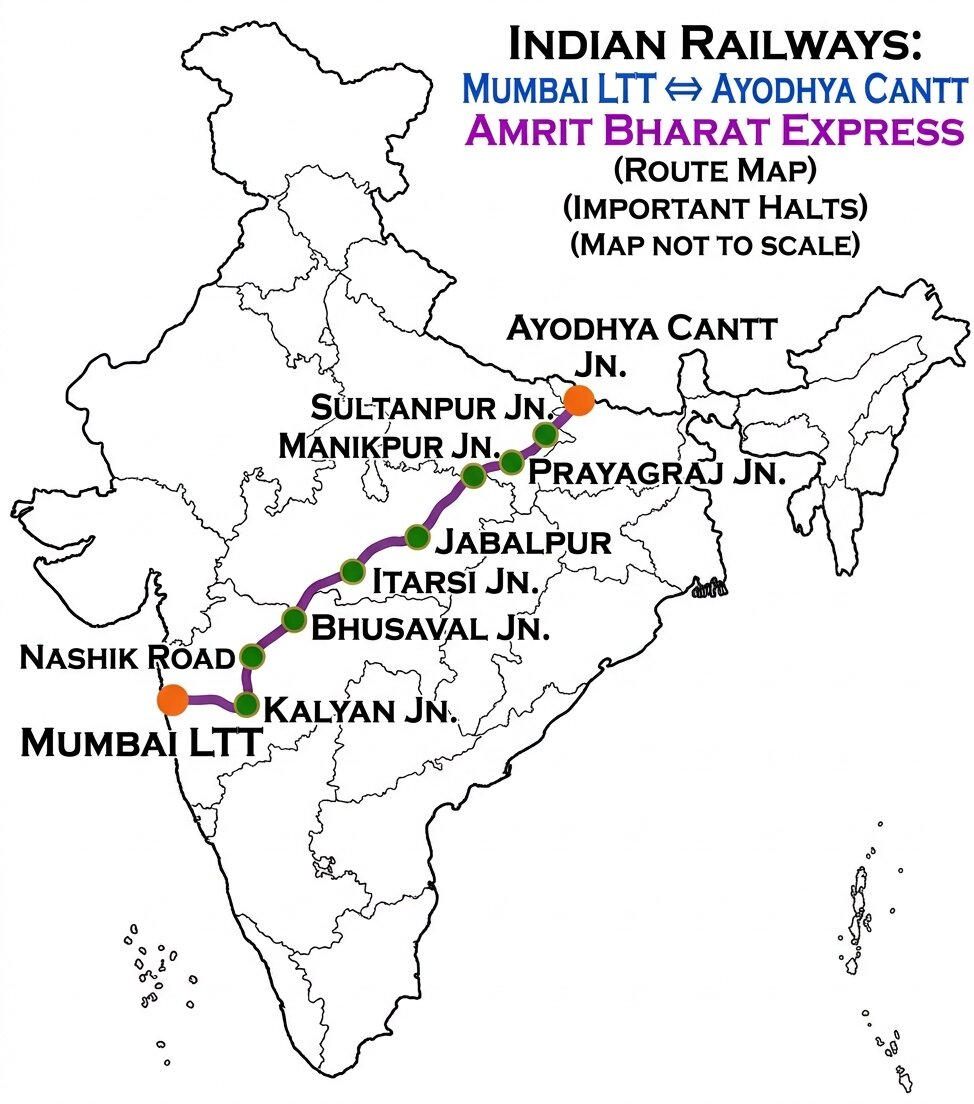

The 22111/22112 Mumbai LTT–Ayodhya Cantt Amrit Bharat Express is India's 33rd Non-AC Superfast Amrit Bharat Express train, which runs across the states of Maharashtra, Madhya Pradesh and Uttar Pradesh by connecting the Lokmanya Tilak Terminus in Mumbai, the financial capital with Ayodhya Cantonment Junction, a major railway station serving the holy city of Ayodhya of Uttar Pradesh in India.

The express train is inaugurated on 28 April 2026 by Honorable Prime Minister Narendra Modi through video conference.

== Overview ==
The train is operated by Indian Railways, connecting Lokmanya Tilak Terminus and Ayodhya Cantt Junction. It is currently operated 22111/22112 on weekly basis.

== Rakes ==
It is the 33rd Amrit Bharat 2.0 Express train in which the locomotives were designed by Chittaranjan Locomotive Works (CLW) at Chittaranjan, West Bengal and the coaches were designed and manufactured by the Integral Coach Factory at Perambur, Chennai under the Make in India Initiative.

== Schedule ==
Train Schedule: Mumbai LTT ↔ Ayodhya Cantt Amrit Bharat Express
Train No.	Station Code	Departure Station	Departure Time	Departure Day	Arrival Station	Arrival Hours
22111	LTT	Lokmanya Tilak Terminus	7:55 AM	Ayodhya Cantt Junction	10:15 AM	26h 20m
22112	AYC	Ayodhya Cantt Junction	1:50 PM	Lokmanya Tilak Terminus	4:15 PM	26h 25m

== Routes and halts ==
The halts for this 22111/22112 Mumbai LTT – Ayodhya Cantt Amrit Bharat Express are as follows:-

1. Lokmanya Tilak Terminus
2. Thane
3. Kalyan Junction
4. Nashik Road
5. Jalgaon Junction
6. Bhusaval Junction
7. Itarsi Junction
8. Jabalpur Junction
9. Satna Junction
10. Manikpur Junction
11. Prayagraj Junction
12. Pratapgarh Junction
13. Sultanpur Junction
14. Ayodhya Cantt Junction

== Rake reversal ==
The train will reverse 1 time :

1. Prayagraj Junction

== See also ==
● Amrit Bharat Express

● Vande Bharat Express

● Rajdhani Express

● Mumbai LTT

● Ayodhya Cantt Junction

== Notes ==
a. Runs a day in a week with both directions.
