= Ahmedabad–Bhagalpur Amrit Bharat Express =

Amrit Bharat Express train route in India

Ahmedabad – Bhagalpur Amrit Bharat Express

Overview
- Service type: Amrit Bharat Express, Superfast
- Status: Active
- Locale: Gujarat, Madhya Pradesh, Rajasthan, Uttar Pradesh and Bihar
- First service: 23 August 2026; 1 day ago (Inaugural); 26 August 2026; 1 day's time (Commercial)
- Current operator: Western Railways (WR)

Route
- Termini: Ahmedabad Junction (ADI); Bhagalpur Junction (BGP)
- Stops: 29
- Distance travelled: 1,981 km (1,231 mi)
- Average journey time: 36 hrs 10 mins
- Service frequency: Weekly
- Train number: 19423/19424
- Lines used: Ahmedabad–Chhayapuri–Ratlam line Towards (Kota Junction), (Sawai Madhopur Junction), (Gangapur City Junction), (Bayana Junction); Tundla–Govindpuri line; Pt. Deen Dayal Upadhyaya–Patna line; Bakhtiyarpur–Mokama line; Kiul–Jamalpur line; Towards Bhagalpur Junction

On-board services
- Classes: Sleeper class coach (SL); General unreserved coach (GS)
- Seating arrangements: Yes
- Sleeping arrangements: Yes
- Auto-rack arrangements: Upper
- Catering facilities: No
- Observation facilities: Saffron-grey
- Entertainment facilities: Electric outlets; Reading lights; Bottle holder
- Other facilities: CCTV cameras; Bio-vacuum toilets; Foot-operated water taps; Passenger information system

Technical
- Rolling stock: Modified LHB coaches
- Track gauge: Indian gauge
- Electrification: 25 kV 50 Hz AC overhead line
- Operating speed: 55 km (34 mi) (Avg.)
- Track owner: Indian Railways
- Rake sharing: No
Route map
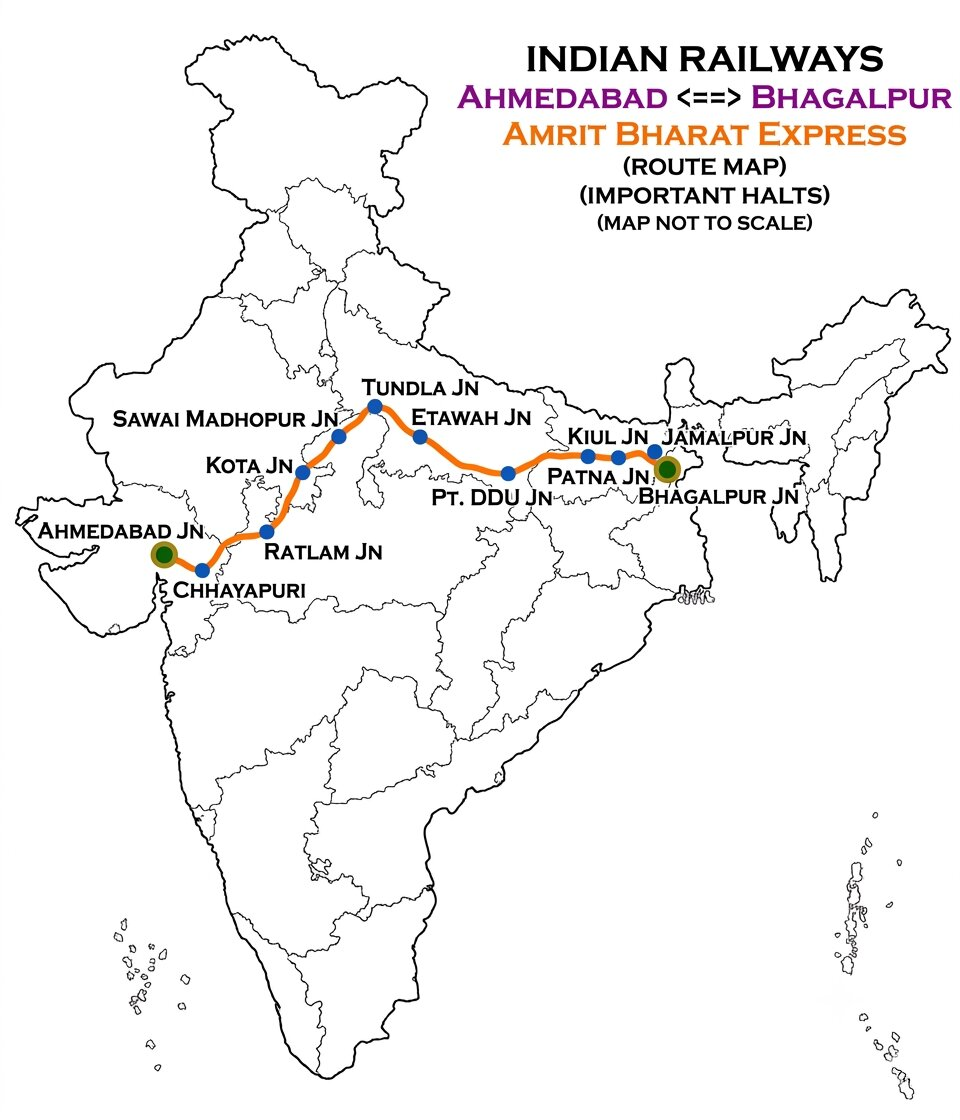

The 19423/19424 Ahmedabad–Bhagalpur Amrit Bharat Express is India's 41st Non-AC Superfast Amrit Bharat Express train, which runs across the states of Gujarat, Madhya Pradesh, Rajasthan, Uttar Pradesh and Bihar by connecting Ahmedabad Junction of Ahmedabad, the commercial capital of Gujarat with Bhagalpur Junction of Bhagalpur, the Silk City of Bihar.

The express train is inaugurated on 2026 by Honorable Prime Minister Narendra Modi through video conference.

== Overview ==
The train is operated by Indian Railways, connecting Ahmedabad Junction and Bhagalpur Junction. It is currently operated 19423/19424 on weekly basis.

== Rakes ==
It is the 41st Amrit Bharat 2.0 Express train in which the locomotives were designed by Chittaranjan Locomotive Works (CLW) at Chittaranjan, West Bengal and the coaches were designed and manufactured by the Integral Coach Factory at Perambur, Chennai under the Make in India Initiative.

== Schedule ==
Train Schedule: Ahmedabad↔ Bhagalpur Amrit Bharat Express
Train No.	Station Code	Departure Station	Departure Time	Departure Day	Arrival Station	Arrival Hours
19423	ADI	Ahmedabad Junction	06:30 PM	Bhagalpur Junction	06:40 AM	36h 10m
19424	BGP	Bhagalpur Junction	04:45 PM	Prayagraj Junction	05:25 AM	36h 40m

== Routes and halts ==
The important halts of the train are :

- Ahmedabad Junction
- Anand Junction
- Chhayapuri
- Godhra Junction
- Dahod
- Ratlam Junction
- Bhawani Mandi
- Ramganj Mandi Junction
- Kota Junction
- Sawai Madhopur Junction
- Gangapur City Junction
- Hindaun City
- Bayana Junction
- Idgah Agra
- Tundla Junction
- Govindpuri
- Subedarganj
- Pt. Deen Dayal Upadhyaya Junction
- Buxar
- Ara Junction
- Danapur
- Patna Junction
- Bakhtiyarpur Junction
- Mokama Junction
- Kiul Junction
- Abhaipur
- Jamalpur Junction
- Sultanganj
- Bhagalpur Junction

== Rake reversal or rake share ==
No rake reversal or rake share.

== See also ==
- Amrit Bharat Express
- Vande Bharat Sleeper Express
- Vande Bharat Express
- Uday Express
- Humsafar Express

== Notes ==
a. Runs a day in a week with both directions.
