= Pokharan =

Pokharan may refer to:

- Pokhran, a city in Rajasthan, India
- Pokharan, Dahanu, a village in Maharashtra, India
- Bade Pokharan, a village in Maharashtra, India
