= Amrit Bharat Express =

Series of express train services of Indian Railways

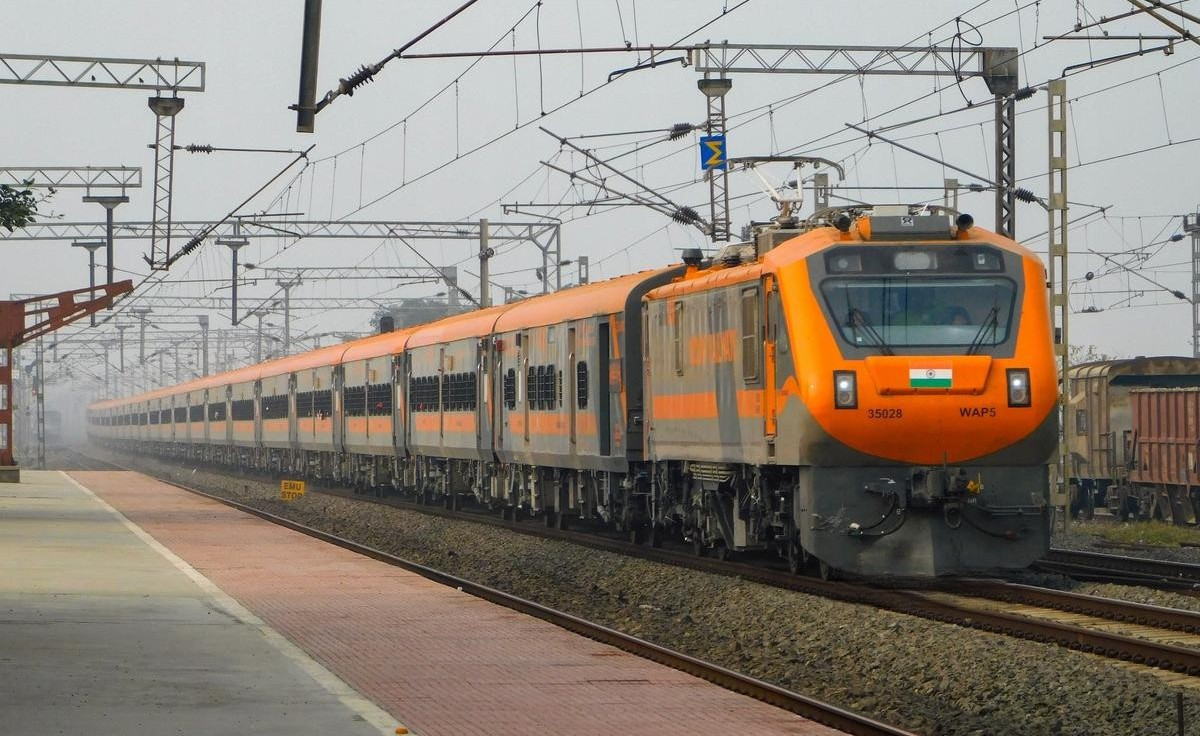
- An Amrit Bharat Express

Overview
- Service type: SuperFast Express Train
- Status: Operational
- First service: 30 December 2023
- Website: indianrail.gov.in

Route
- Line used: 44

On-board services
- Classes: Sleeper Class (SL); General Unreserved (GS)
- Sleeping arrangements: Yes
- Other facilities: Electric outlet; reading light; CCTV cameras; bio-vacuum toilet; sensor-based water taps; passenger information system

Technical
- Rolling stock: Amrit Bharat (trainset)
- Track gauge: 1,676 mm (5 ft 6 in)
- Electrification: Locomotives – 25 kV 50 Hz AC via overhead line
- Operating speed: 130 km/h (81 mph) (maximum); 160 km/h (99 mph) (design)
- Average length: 23.54 m (77.2 ft) (each) and 22 coaches
- Rake maintenance: Locomotives – Zonal various loco sheds Coaches – Zonal various coaching depots

The Amrit Bharat Express is a superfast express service operated by Indian Railways. It is a non-air-conditioned, low-cost, sleeper and unreserved service connecting cities that are more than 800 km (500 mi) apart or take more than ten hours to travel with existing services.

The trainset uses a push-pull technology, which consists of two locomotives on both the ends (either WAP-7 or WAP-5 AB or a WAP-7 AB in orange and dark grey paint work). The train has a maximum operating speed of 110–130 km/h (68–81 mph). The train has a total of 22 coaches. The 22 coaches are divided into 20 coaches for passengers and 2 for parcels.. In 2026, 20610 Tiruchchirappali - New Jalpaiguri Amrit Bharat Express pulled by a single Royapuram-based WAP-7 for first time without a push-pull configuration

The train entered commercial service on 1 January 2024.

== History ==
In July 2023, Indian Railways announced plans for a non-air-conditioned train with sleeper and general facilities for long-distance travel. The trainsets are manufactured by Integral Coach Factory, Chennai at the cost of ₹65 crore (US$6.7 million) per trainset. The first train was flagged off on 30 December 2023 and entered commercial service on 1 January 2024. Production for 200 more such trains are in progress, with 50 under construction and 150 more planned.

In January 2025, the Ministry of Railways added twelve major improvements in the train which includes emergency braking system.

In August 2026, the Indian Railways approved the addition of seven new Amrit Bharat Express Trains across India.

== Services ==
As of April 2026, 43 Amrit Bharat Express trains are currently present, out of which 36 Amrit Bharat Express trains are currently operational.

Train name	Train number	Operator	Halts	Frequency	Distance	Travel time	Speed		Inaugural run	Ref
Train name	Train number	Operator	Halts	Frequency	Distance	Travel time	Maximum	Average	Inaugural run	Ref
Darbhanga–Anand Vihar (Delhi) Terminal	15557/15558	ECR	18	Bi-weekly	1,137 km (706 mi)	20h 40m	130 km (81 mi)	55 km (34 mi)	30 December 2023	
Malda Town–SMVT Bengaluru	13433/13434	ER	32	Weekly	2,272 km (1,412 mi)	45h 10m	130 km (81 mi)	50 km (31 mi)	30 December 2023	
Mumbai LTT–Saharsa	11015/11016	CR	22	Weekly	1,950 km (1,210 mi)	35h 50m	130 km/h (81 mph)	54 km/h (34 mph)	24 April 2025	
Rajendra Nagar (Patna) Terminal–New Delhi	22361/22362	ECR	08	Daily	999 km (621 mi)	16h 35m	130 km/h (81 mph)	60 km/h (37 mph)	18 July 2025	
Darbhanga–Gomti Nagar (Lucknow)	15561/15562	ECR	16	Weekly	629 km (391 mi)	14h 35m	110 km/h (68 mph)	43 km/h (27 mph)	18 July 2025	
Malda Town–Gomti Nagar (Lucknow)	13435/13436	ER	23	Weekly	948 km (589 mi)	20h 15m	130 km/h (81 mph)	47 km/h (29 mph)	18 July 2025	
Bapudham Motihari–Anand Vihar (Delhi) Terminal	15567/15568	ECR	16	Bi-weekly	978 km (608 mi)	22h 10m	110 km/h (68 mph)	44 km/h (27 mph)	18 July 2025	
Sitamarhi–Delhi Junction	14047/14048	NR	14	Weekly	1,049 km (652 mi)	24h 25m	110 km/h (68 mph)	43 km/h (27 mph)	9 August 2025	
Gaya–Delhi Junction	13697/13698	ECR	09	Bi-weekly	986 km (613 mi)	18h 55m	130 km/h (81 mph)	52 km/h (32 mph)	22 August 2025	
Erode–Jogbani	16601/16602	SR	50	Weekly	3,129 km (1,944 mi)	58h 50m	110 km/h (68 mph)	53 km/h (33 mph)	15 September 2025	
Saharsa–Chheharta (Amritsar)	14627/14628	NR	34	Weekly	1,571 km (976 mi)	38h 20m	130 km/h (81 mph)	47 km/h (29 mph)	15 September 2025	
Udhna (Surat)–Brahmapur	19021/19022	WR	30	Daily	1,710 km (1,060 mi)	30h 45m	130 km/h (81 mph)	56 km/h (35 mph)	27 September 2025	
Chhapra–Anand Vihar (Delhi) Terminal	15133/15134	NER	18	Weekly	949 km (590 mi)	24h 10m	130 km/h (81 mph)	39 km/h (24 mph)	29 September 2025	
Madar (Ajmer)–Darbhanga	19623/19624	NWR	30	Weekly	1,710 km (1,060 mi)	30h 45m	130 km/h (81 mph)	56 km/h (35 mph)	29 September 2025	
Muzaffarpur–Charlapalli (Hyderabad)	15293/15294	ECR	23	Weekly	1,889 km (1,174 mi)	37h 10m	130 km/h (81 mph)	56 km/h (35 mph)	29 September 2025	
Nagercoil–New Jalpaiguri	20604/20603	SR	45	Weekly	3,102 km (1,927 mi)	54h 0m	130 km/h (81 mph)	57 km/h (35 mph)	17 January 2026	
Panvel (Mumbai)–Alipurduar	11031/11032	CR	34	Weekly	2,355 km (1,463 mi)	50h 0m	130 km/h (81 mph)	47 km/h (29 mph)	17 January 2026	
Tiruchchirappalli–New Jalpaiguri	20610/20609	SR	40	Weekly	2,622 km (1,629 mi)	47h 15m	130 km/h (81 mph)	56 km/h (35 mph)	17 January 2026	
SMVT Bengaluru–Alipurduar	16597/16598	SWR	44	Weekly	2,626 km (1,632 mi)	49h 35m	130 km/h (81 mph)	53 km/h (33 mph)	17 January 2026	
Kamakhya (Guwahati)–Rohtak	15671/15672	NFR	30	Weekly	1,940 km (1,210 mi)	40h 45m	130 km/h (81 mph)	48 km/h (30 mph)	18 January 2026	
Dibrugarh–Gomti Nagar (Lucknow)	15949/15950	NFR	42	Weekly	1,755 km (1,091 mi)	40h 30m	130 km/h (81 mph)	43 km/h (27 mph)	18 January 2026	
Tambaram (Chennai)–Santragachi (Kolkata)	16107/16108	SR	28	Weekly	1,668 km (1,036 mi)	28h 45m	130 km/h (81 mph)	58 km/h (36 mph)	18 January 2026	
Howrah–Anand Vihar (Delhi) Terminal	13065/13066	ER	27	Weekly	1,440 km (890 mi)	27h 40m	130 km/h (81 mph)	52 km/h (32 mph)	18 January 2026	
Banaras–Sealdah (Kolkata)	22587/22588	NER	8	Tri-Weekly	772 km (480 mi)	11h 50m	130 km/h (81 mph)	65 km/h (40 mph)	18 January 2026	
Tambaram (Chennai)–Thiruvananthapuram Central	16121/16122	SR	17	Weekly	768 km (477 mi)	14h 30m	130 km/h (81 mph)	53 km/h (33 mph)	23 January 2026	
Nagercoil–Mangaluru	16329/16330	SR	21	Weekly	693 km (431 mi)	17h 20m	130 km/h (81 mph)	40 km/h (25 mph)	23 January 2026	
Charlapalli (Hyderabad)–Thiruvananthapuram North	17041/17042	SCR	31	Weekly	1,488 km (925 mi)	31h 30m	130 km/h (81 mph)	47 km/h (29 mph)	23 January 2026	
Podanur (Coimbatore)–Dhanbad	16619/16620	SR	34	Weekly	2,182 km (1,356 mi)	45h 45m	130 km/h (81 mph)	48 km/h (30 mph)	11 March 2026	
Nagercoil–Charlapalli (Hyderabad)	16357/16358	SR	30	Weekly	1,412 km (877 mi)	28h 35m	130 km/h (81 mph)	49 km/h (30 mph)	11 March 2026	
Kamakhya (Guwahati)–Charlapalli (Hyderabad)	15673/15674	NFR	43	Weekly	2,472 km (1,536 mi)	43h 20m	130 km/h (81 mph)	49 km/h (30 mph)	13 March 2026	
Charlapalli (Hyderabad)–Shalimar (Kolkata)	17065/17066	SCR	24	Weekly	1,546 km (961 mi)	28h 5m	130 km/h (81 mph)	55 km/h (34 mph)	7 April 2026	
Banaras–Hadapsar (Pune)	22589/22590	NER	20	Daily	1,710 km (1,060 mi)	29h 55m	130 km/h (81 mph)	57 km/h (35 mph)	2 May 2026	
Mumbai LTT–Ayodhya Cantt.	22111/22112	CR	14	Weekly	1,500 km (930 mi)	26h 20m	130 km/h (81 mph)	57 km/h (35 mph)	3 May 2026	
New Jalpaiguri–Amritsar	14663/14664	NFR	23	Weekly	1,778 km (1,105 mi)	42h 15m	130 km/h (81 mph)	42 km/h (26 mph)	14 May 2026	
Khatipura (Jaipur)–Darbhanga	19725/19726	NWR	25	6 Days	1,164 km (723 mi)	26h 25m	130 km/h (81 mph)	44 km/h (27 mph)	22 June 2026	
Pune–Danapur	11431/11432	CR	21	Weekly	1,748 km (1,086 mi)	34h 05m	130 km/h (81 mph)	51 km/h (32 mph)	27 June 2026	
Mumbai LTT–Prayagraj	20435/20436	NCR	7	Weekly	1,342 km (834 mi)	19h 20m	130 km/h (81 mph)	69 km/h (43 mph)	22 August 2026	
Dhanbad–Coimbatore	22363/22364	ECR	41	Weekly	2,976 km (1,849 mi)	50h 20m	130 km/h (81 mph)	59 km/h (37 mph)	22 August 2026	
Prayagraj–Udhna (Surat)	20437/20438	NCR	16	Weekly	1,440 km (890 mi)	22h 45m	130 km/h (81 mph)	63 km/h (39 mph)	24 August 2026	
Subedarganj–Mumbai LTT	14121/14122	NCR	20	Weekly	1,670 km (1,040 mi)	32h 40m	130 km/h (81 mph)	51 km/h (32 mph)	24 August 2026	
Ahmedabad–Bhagalpur	19423/19424	WR	29	Weekly	1,981 km (1,231 mi)	36h 10m	130 km/h (81 mph)	55 km/h (34 mph)	26 August 2026	
Gorakhpur–Delhi Junction	15095/15096	NER	10	Weekly	724 km (450 mi)	36h 10m	130 km/h (81 mph)	51 km/h (32 mph)	27 August 2026	
Gorakhpur–Bandra Terminus	15085/15086	NER	22	Weekly	1,842 km (1,145 mi)	34h 10m	130 km/h (81 mph)	54 km/h (34 mph)	28 August 2026	
Charlapalli (Hyderabad)–Gorakhpur	22075/22076	SCR	21	Weekly	1,811 km (1,125 mi)	32h 40m	130 km/h (81 mph)	55 km/h (34 mph)	2 October 2026	

== Technology ==
The train uses a semi-permanent coupler which is used to negate the effect of jerks.

== See also ==
- Superfast Express trains in India
- Vande Bharat Sleeper Express
- Vande Bharat Express
- Namo Bharat Rapid Rail
- Humsafar Express
