= Fatehpur railway station =

Railway station in Uttar Pradesh, India

Fatehpur Railway Station
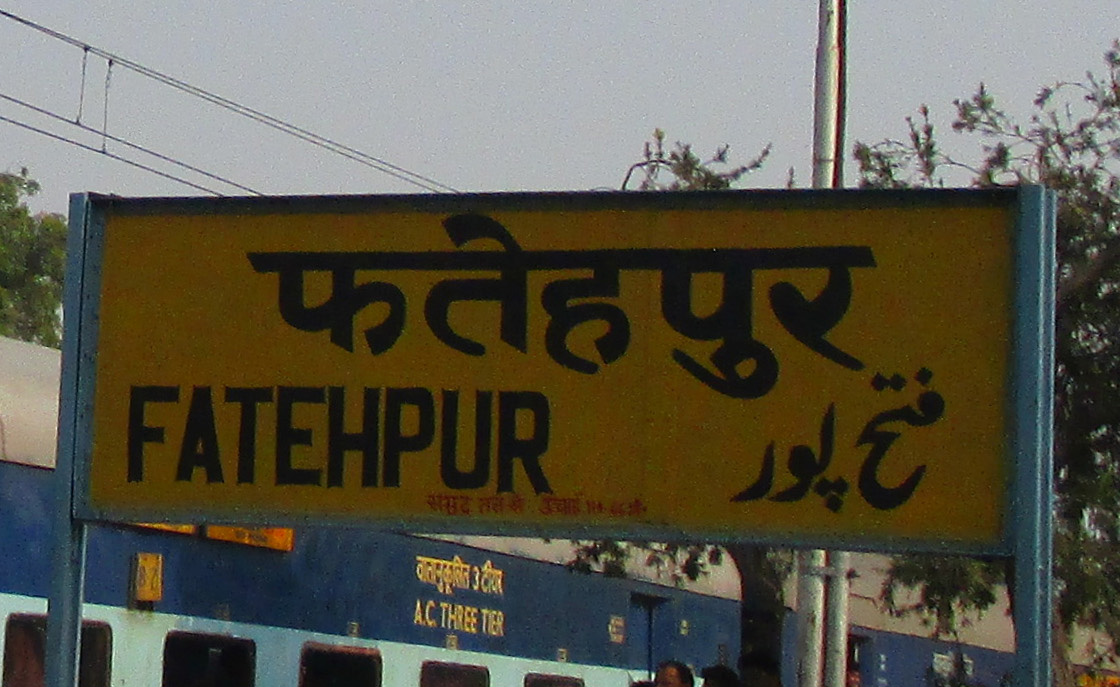
- Fatehpur railway station nameplate

General information
- Location: Banda Sagar Road, Fatehpur, Uttar Pradesh; India
- Coordinates: 25°55′02″N 80°48′05″E
- Elevation: 942 metres (3,091 ft)
- System: Indian Railways station
- Owner: Indian Railways
- Operator: North Central Railway
- Lines: Howrah–Delhi main line Howrah–Gaya–Delhi line Prayagraj-kanpur-Jhansi Prayagraj-Kanpur-Farrukhabad
- Platforms: 4

Construction
- Structure type: At grade
- Parking: Yes
- Cycle facilities: No

Other information
- Status: Functioning
- Station code: FTP
- Division(s): Prayagraj

History
- Opened: 1859
- Electrified: 1966–67
- Former names: East Indian Railway Company
Location
- Location within India Location within Uttar Pradesh

Fatehpur railway station is on the Pandit Deen Dayal Upadhyaya Junction – Kanpur section of the Howrah–Delhi main line under Prayagraj railway division. It is located in Fatehpur district in the Indian state of Uttar Pradesh. It serves Fatehpur and the surrounding areas. Other major stations in the city of Fatehpur are Aung, Bindki Road, Kanspur Guguali, Malwa, Kurasti Kalan, Ramva, Faizullapur, Rasulabad, Sath Naraini, and Khaga railway station.

== History ==
The East Indian Railway Company initiated efforts to develop a railway line from Howrah to Delhi in the mid-nineteenth century. Even when the line from Howrah to Mughalsarai was being constructed, and only the lines near Howrah were put in operation, the first train ran from Allahabad to Kanpur in 1859, and the Kanpur–Etawah section was opened to traffic in the 1860s. For the first through train from Howrah to Delhi in 1864, coaches were ferried on boats across the Yamuna at Allahabad. With the completion of the Old Naini Bridge across the Yamuna through trains started running in 1865–66.

== Electrification ==
The Subedarganj–Manoharganj–Athasarai–Kanspur Gugauli-Panki and Chandari loops were electrified in 1966–67.

== Amenities ==
Fatehpur railway station has 1 double-bedded non-AC retiring room.

Preceding station	Indian Railways	Following station
Ramva towards ?	North Central Railway zone Mughalsarai–Kanpur section	Kurasti Kalan towards ?
