= Bade Pokharan =

Village in Maharashtra

Bade Pokharan Badapokharan
- village
- Location in Maharashtra, India Bade Pokharan (India)
- Coordinates: 19.9443935°N 72.6949373°E
- Country: India
- State: Maharashtra
- District: Palghar
- Taluka: Dahanu
- Elevation: 18 m (59 ft)

Population (2011)
  - Total: 1,686
- Time zone: UTC+5:30 (IST)
- 2011 census code: 551719

Bade Pokharan is a village in the Palghar district of Maharashtra, India. It is located in the Dahanu taluka.

== Demographics ==
According to the 2011 census of India, Bade Pokharan has 378 households. The effective literacy rate (i.e. the literacy rate of population excluding children aged 6 and below) is 84.62%.

Demographics (2011 Census)
	Total	Male	Female
Population	1686	839	847
Children aged below 6 years	204	107	97
Scheduled caste	0	0	0
Scheduled tribe	46	22	24
Literates	1254	683	571
Workers (all)	664	495	169
Main workers (total)	643	488	155
Main workers: Cultivators	114	101	13
Main workers: Agricultural labourers	216	112	104
Main workers: Household industry workers	131	127	4
Main workers: Other	182	148	34
Marginal workers (total)	21	7	14
Marginal workers: Cultivators	5	3	2
Marginal workers: Agricultural labourers	12	3	9
Marginal workers: Household industry workers	2	0	2
Marginal workers: Others	2	1	1
Non-workers	1022	344	678
