= Pokharan, Dahanu =

Village in Maharashtra

Pokharan
- village
- Location in Maharashtra, India Pokharan (India)
- Coordinates: 19.9468655°N 72.7052826°E
- Country: India
- State: Maharashtra
- District: Palghar
- Taluka: Dahanu
- Elevation: 15 m (49 ft)

Population (2011)
  - Total: 622
- Time zone: UTC+5:30 (IST)
- 2011 census code: 551717

Pokharan is a village in the Palghar district of Maharashtra, India. It is located in the Dahanu taluka.

== Demographics ==
According to the 2011 census of India, Pokharan has 165 households. The effective literacy rate (i.e. the literacy rate of population excluding children aged 6 and below) is 89.02%.

Demographics (2011 Census)
	Total	Male	Female
Population	622	305	317
Children aged below 6 years	21	12	9
Scheduled caste	66	34	32
Scheduled tribe	28	13	15
Literates	535	267	268
Workers (all)	291	179	112
Main workers (total)	211	141	70
Main workers: Cultivators	122	91	31
Main workers: Agricultural labourers	18	10	8
Main workers: Household industry workers	2	1	1
Main workers: Other	69	39	30
Marginal workers (total)	80	38	42
Marginal workers: Cultivators	54	26	28
Marginal workers: Agricultural labourers	9	3	6
Marginal workers: Household industry workers	0	0	0
Marginal workers: Others	17	9	8
Non-workers	331	126	205
