= Kanpur–Pandit Deen Dayal Upadhyaya Junction section =

Railway line in India

Pandit Deen Dayal Upadhyaya Junction – Kanpur section Mughalsarai–Kanpur section
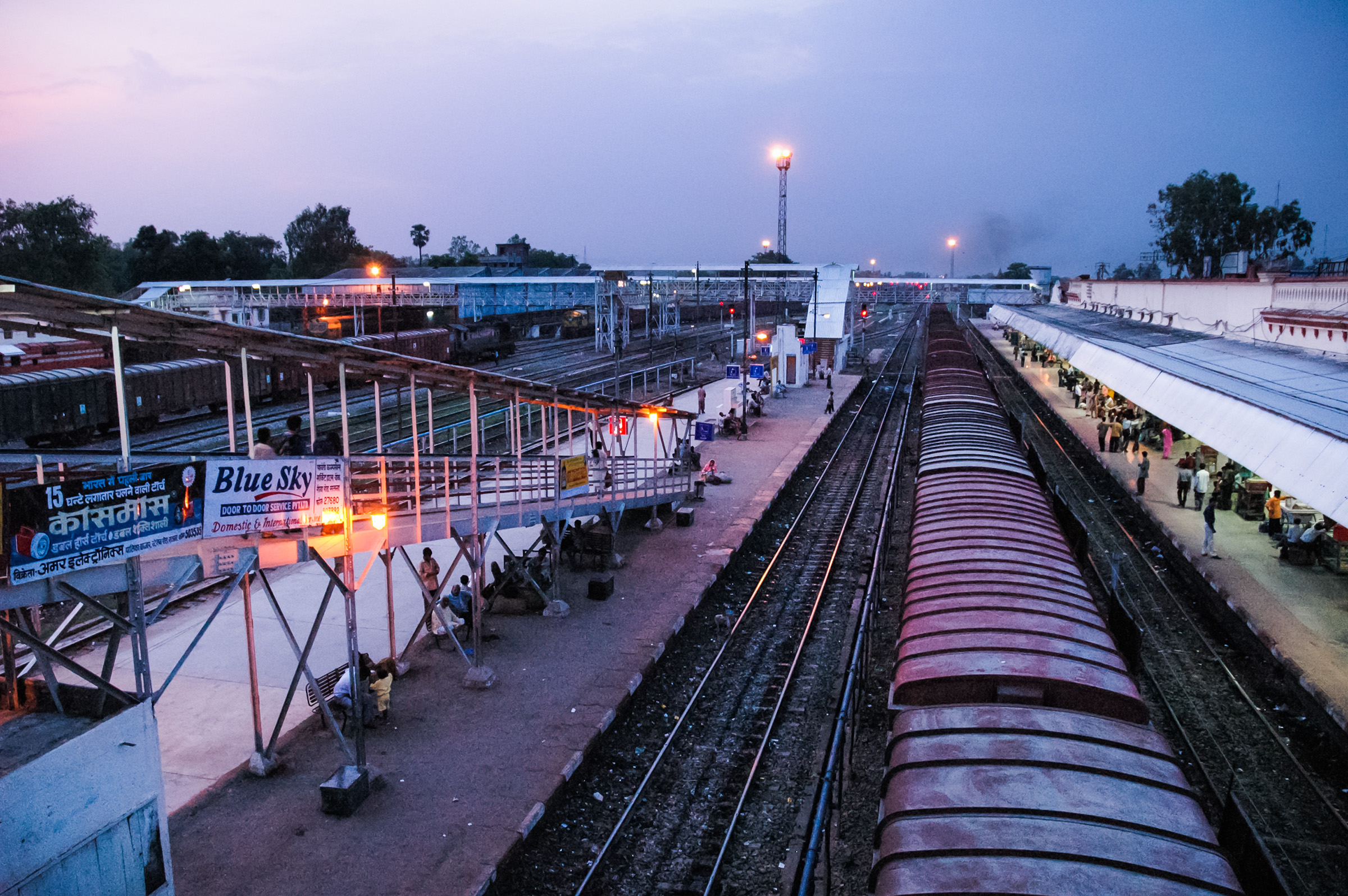
- Prayagraj Junction is an important railway station on Pt.DDU Junction–Kanpur section

Overview
- Status: Operational
- Owner: Indian Railways
- Locale: Gangetic Plain in Uttar Pradesh
- Termini: Pandit Deen Dayal Upadhyaya Junction; Kanpur Central

Service
- Operator(s): North Central Railway for main line North Eastern Railway and Northern Railway for certain branch lines
- Depot(s): Pandit Deen Dayal Upadhyaya Junction and Kanpur Central
- Rolling stock: WDM-2, WDM-3A and WDS-5 diesel locos; WAM-4, WAP-4 and WAG-7 electric locos

History
- Opened: 1859 (partial, locally); 1866 (through main line)

Technical
- Track length: Main line: 346 km (215 mi); Branch lines: Varanasi–Allahabad City 130 km (81 mi); Varanasi–Phaphamau 122 km (76 mi); Allahabad–Kanpur via Unnao 249 km (155 mi)
- Track gauge: 5 ft 6 in (1,676 mm) broad gauge
- Electrification: 25 kV 50 Hz AC OHLE in 1968
- Operating speed: 130 km/h (81 mph)

The Pandit Deen Dayal Upadhyaya Junction – Kanpur section, formerly Mughalsarai–Kanpur section, officially Kanpur - Pt. Deen Dayal Upadhyay (CNB-DDU) section, is a railway line connecting Pandit Deen Dayal Upadhyaya Junction (DDU) and Kanpur Central (CNB) stations. This 347 km (216 mi) track is part of the Howrah–Delhi main line and Howrah–Gaya–Delhi line. The main line is under the jurisdiction of North Central Railway. Pandit Deen Dayal Upadhyaya Junction is under the jurisdiction of East Central Railway. Some branch lines are under the jurisdiction of the North Eastern Railway and Northern Railway.

== Geography ==
The main line was laid in the Gangetic Plain, south of the Ganges. Between Naini and Prayagraj (Allahabad), it crosses the Yamuna and enters the doab region or the inland peninsula between the Ganges and Yamuna, still keeping south of the Ganges. Some branch lines came up on the northern side of the Ganges and got interlinked as bridges came up across the Ganges.

Two places on these tracks are major pilgrimage centres – Prayagraj on the main line and Varanasi, a little off the main line, on a branch line. Varanasi is connected by rail to places throughout India. The railways make special arrangements for the huge influx of pilgrims for the Kumbh Mela at Prayagraj.

The railways played a major role in the development of Kanpur as an industrial centre. The 1050 MW Feroze Gandhi Unchahar Thermal Power Plant, in this section, consumed 5,022,000 tonnes of coal in 2006–07, which was transported by the railways.

== History ==
The East Indian Railway Company initiated efforts to develop a railway line from Howrah to Delhi in the mid nineteenth century. Even when the line to Mughalsarai was being constructed and only the lines near Howrah were put in operation, the first train ran from Allahabad (now Prayagraj) to Kanpur in 1859 and the Kanpur–Etawah section was opened to traffic in the 1860s. For the first through train from Howrah to Delhi in 1864, coaches were ferried on boats across the Yamuna at Allahabad. With the completion of the Old Naini Bridge across the Yamuna through trains started running in 1865–66.

In 1867, the Indian Branch Railway Company opened the Kanpur–Lucknow line.

The Oudh and Rohilkhand Railway opened the line from Varanasi to Lucknow in 1872.

The construction of the Dufferin Bridge (later renamed Malviya Bridge), across the Ganges, in 1887, connected Mughalsarai and Varanasi.

The opening of the Curzon Bridge, across the Ganges, in 1902, linked Allahabad to regions north of or beyond the Ganges.

The Varanasi–Allahabad City (Rambagh) line was constructed as a 1,000 mm (3 ft 3 3/8 in)-wide metre-gauge line by the Bengal and North Western Railway between 1899 and 1913. The line was converted to 5 ft 6 in (1,676 mm) broad gauge in 1993–94.

== Electrification ==
Electrification in the Mughalsarai–Kanpur sector started in 1964–65 with the Mughalsarai–Dagmagpur section. In 1965–66, Mughalsarai Yard was electrified, along with the Dagmagpur–Cheoki and the Cheoki–Subedarganj sections. The Subedarganj–Manoharganj–Athasarai–Kanspur Gugauli–Panki and Chandari loops were electrified in 1966–67. Kanpur–Panki was electrified in 1968–69. The entire Mughalsarai–Prayagraj–Kanpur section was electrified with AC overhead line in 1968.

The Kanpur–Kanpur Bridge–Unnao–Lucknow section was electrified in 1999–2000.

The electrification work was completed in the Varanasi–Lohta–Janghai–Phaphamau–Unchahar and the Phaphamau–Prayag–Prayagraj Jn sections in early 2010s.

== Sheds and workshops ==
Mughal Sarai diesel loco shed is home to WDM-2, WDM-3A and WDS-5 diesel locos. There was a Northern Railway diesel loco shed at Mughalsarai. It was decommissioned in 2001. Mughalsarai electric loco shed can hold more than 150 electric locos. Amongst them are WAM-4, WAP-4 and more than 70 WAG-7 locos. Kanpur Central electric loco shed accommodates WAP-7, WAP-4, WAG-9 and WAG-7 electric locos.

The largest wagon repair workshop of Indian Railways is located at Mughalsarai. There are engineering workshops at Prayagraj.

== Marshalling yard ==
Mughalsarai marshalling yard is the largest in Asia. It is 12.5 km long and handles around 1,500 wagons daily. Wagon handling has come down after the railways discontinued piecemeal loading. At its peak, it handled 5,000 wagons a day.

== Speed limits ==
The entire Howrah–Delhi line, via Howrah–Bardhaman chord and Grand Chord is classified as a "Group A" line which can take speeds up to 160 km/h. However actual maximum permissible speed on Pandit Deen Dayal Upadhyaya Junction–Kanpur section is 130 km/h for Rajdhani, Shatabdi, Duronto, GR and a few Express trains.

== Passenger movement ==
Mughalsarai Junction, Allahabad and Kanpur Central on the main line, and Varanasi Junction on a branch line are amongst the top hundred booking stations of Indian Railway.
