= Amrit Bharat (trainset) =

Indian push-pull trainsets

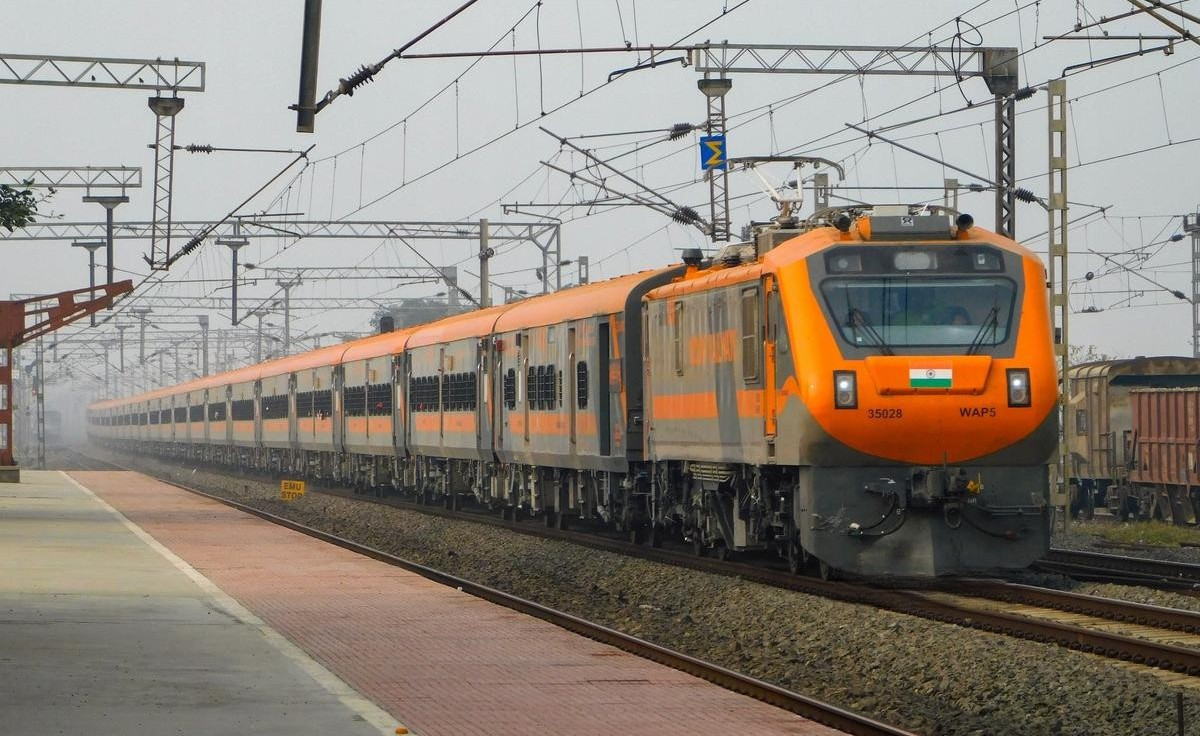
- An Amrit Bharat trainset
- Stock type: Push-pull train
- In service: 30 December 2023
- Manufacturers: Coaches: ICF Chennai, RCF Kapurthala; Locomotives: CLW Chittaranjan, BLW Varanasi
- Designers: RDSO, ICF
- Assembly: Chennai, Kapurthala
- Constructed: 2023–present
- Entered service: 30 December 2023
- Number built: 9 (by ICF); Unknown (by RCF)
- Formation: 2 locomotives and 22 coaches (Push-pull configuration)
- Capacity: 1,834
- Owner: Indian Railways
- Operator: Indian Railways
- Line served: 44

Specifications
- Car body construction: Spotwelded stainless steel
- Car length: 23.54 m (77 ft 2 3/4 in) (body); 24 m (78 ft 8 7/8 in) (coupler-coupler)
- Floor height: 1,320 mm (4 ft 4 in)
- Platform height: 840 mm (2 ft 9 1/8 in)
- Entry: Step
- Doors: Manual pivot hinge doors
- Wheel diameter: 855–915 mm (33.66–36.02 in)
- Wheelbase: 14.9 m (48 ft 10 5/8 in) bogie centres
- Maximum speed: 160 km/h (99 mph)
- Weight: 39.5 t (38.9 long tons; 43.5 short tons) (average)
- Electric system: 25 kV 50 Hz AC via overhead line
- Current collection: Pantograph
- Track gauge: 1,676 mm (5 ft 6 in)

Amrit Bharat is an Indian push-pull train, designed and developed by Indian Railways at its Integral Coach Factory in Chennai. It has non-air-conditioned three-tier sleeper and unreserved coaches.

== Overview ==
Amrit Bharat trains have upgraded non-air-conditioned three-tier sleeper and unreserved coaches. The coaches are manufactured by Integral Coach Factory, Chennai at the cost of ₹650 million (US$6.7 million) per trainset. In contrast to other Indian trains, the trainsets have a locomotive at both ends in a push-pull configuration (the only regular train run in a push-pull configuration prior to this was the Mumbai CSMT–Hazrat Nizamuddin Rajdhani Express) enabling better acceleration and shorter turnaround times in direction reversals. It has also been termed as common man train.

== Engineering ==
The trainsets are powered by two WAP-5 or WAP-7AB locomotives connected at each ends with vibration resistance engines manufactured by Chittaranjan Locomotive Works and Banaras Locomotive Works. The Locomotive also features aerodynamic design. Each trainset consists of 22 coaches: 12 3-tier sleeper class, 8 unreserved and 2 luggage coaches. As part of the "Make in India" Initiative, the Integral Coach Factory (ICF) and Rail Coach Factory (RCF) a subsidiary of Indian Railways (IR), created and produced the Amrit Bharat Express.

=== First Generation ===
The first generation of Amrit Bharat were built in 2023. The coaches are equipped with electric outlets, reading lights, CCTV cameras, bio-vacuum toilets, sensor-based water taps and passenger information system. The trainsets also have semi-permanent couplers to avoid shocks during starting and stopping of the train and fully-covered vestibules to facilitate stability and safety.

=== Second Generation ===
The first prototype of the second generation of Amrit Bharat was built in 2025.

The semi-permanent couplers of the first generation have been replaced by semi-automatic couplers for easy attachment and detachment. Other improvements include an electro-pneumatic assisted brake system for quick brake application, a fully sealed gangway for quick coupling and decoupling, and a vacuum evacuation system.

The train has an onboard condition monitoring system for real-time tracking of wheels and bearings, and internet-based water level indicators. External emergency lights have been added to provide basic lighting during emergencies.

Improvements to toilets include adding a disabled-friendly toilet and toilet indicator lights. The toilets have an automatic hygiene odour control system. Toilets are built with sheet molding compound material for ease of maintenance and aesthetics.

Each passenger has a dedicated charging socket with USB A and C-type ports. Other additions include a foldable snack table, mobile holder, and foldable bottle holder. A public address and passenger information system has been added, along with an emergency system to connect with the loco pilot. The seat and berth design has been improved for a comfortable ride.

=== Third Generation ===
The first prototype of the third generation of Amrit Bharat was built in 2026.

The trainsets will be powered by two WAP-7 locomotives connected at each ends with vibration resistance engines manufactured by the Indian Railways' subsidiary, Banaras Locomotive Works. The Locomotive also features aerodynamic design. Each trainset consists of 22 coaches: 1 1st AC Class, 2 2nd AC Class, 6 3rd AC Class, 6 Sleeper Class, 4 unreserved and 2 luggage coaches. As part of the "Make in India" Initiative, the Integral Coach Factory (ICF), a subsidiary of Indian Railways (IR), created and produced the Amrit Bharat Express.

== Rake Formation ==
The rake formations of all the operational versions of the train are given below:

Abbreviations

- SLR – Sitting cum Luggage Rake
- UR / GS – UnReserved Coach
- SL – Sleeper Coach
- PC – Pantry Car Coach

Rake formation of Amrit Bharat Express
Coach Sr. No.	1	2	3	4	5	6	7	8	9	10	11	12	13	14	15	16	17	18	19	20	21	22
Travel Class	SLR	UR / GS				SL												UR / GS				SLR
Seating Capacity (Per Coach)	50	100				80												100				50

Rake formation of Amrit Bharat Express 2.0
Coach Sr. No.	1	2	3	4	5	6	7	8	9	10	11	12	13	14	15	16	17	18	19	20	21	22
Travel Class	SLR	UR / GS					SL				PC	SL				UR / GS						SLR
Seating Capacity (Per Coach)	50	100					80				Nil	80				100						50

== See also ==
- B28 trainset – Upcoming Indian high speed train type
- Vande Bharat (trainset)
- Vande Bharat (sleeper trainset)
