= Chittaranjan Locomotive Works =

Rolling stock manufacturing unit in India

Coordinates: 23.85891°N 86.91111°E

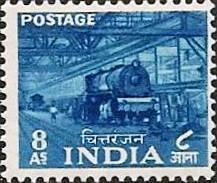
- Commemorative postal stamp, 1955
- Formerly: Loco Building Works
- Type: Electric locomotive production unit
- Industry: Rail transport
- Founded: 26 January 1950; 76 years ago
- Headquarters: Chittaranjan, Asansol, West Bengal, India
- Key people: Shri Anil Kumar Gupta (Principal Chief Administrative Officer (PCAO)) Shri Mohit Chandra (GM & CEO)
- Products: WAP-7; WAG-9; EF9K; EF12K
- Production output: 700 (2024)
- Revenue: ₹7,326.41 crore (US$780 million) (2024)
- Total assets: ₹18,654 crore (US$2.0 billion) (2024)
- Owner: Indian Railways
- Number of employees: 8138 (2024)
- Website: clw.indianrailways.gov.in

Chittaranjan Locomotive Works (CLW) is an Indian state-owned electric locomotive manufacturer. The works are located at Chittaranjan in the Asansol Sadar subdivision of West Bengal, with an ancillary unit in Dankuni. The main unit is approximately 32 km (20 mi) from Asansol and 237 km (147 mi) from Kolkata. CLW has a stores purchase office in Kolkata, as well as inspection cells in New Delhi, Mumbai, Kolkata and Bangalore. It is one of the world's largest electric locomotive manufacturing units. In FY 2024–25, CLW produced 700 locomotives, contributing to Indian Railways' total production of 1,681 locomotives, which surpassed the combined production of the United States and Europe.

== History ==
Chittaranjan Locomotive Works (CLW) has been named after the great freedom fighter, leader and statesmen Deshbandhu Chittaranjan Das. A new survey led to the present site at Chittaranjan being established, which was approved by the railway board in 1947. A survey of the proposed area began on 9 January 1948; the rocky soil was an advantage in erecting structural foundations, and the undulating terrain solved the problem of drainage for the township. The Damodar Valley Corporation envisioned hydro-electric and thermal power stations in the area, assuring adequate power availability for the project.

The project was launched as Loco Building Works in 1950 to produce 120 average-sized steam locomotives annually. It also had the capacity to manufacture 50 spare boilers. Production of steam locomotives commenced on 26 January 1950. The first President of India, Rajendra Prasad, dedicated the first steam locomotive to the nation on 1 November 1950, and on the same day, Loco Building Works was renamed Chittaranjan Locomotive Works after Deshbandhu Chittaranjan Das. The nearby Mihijam railway station was also renamed Chittaranjan.

== See also ==
- Banaras Locomotive Works, Varanasi
- Patiala Locomotive Works, Patiala
- Diesel Locomotive Factory, Marhowrah
- Electric Locomotive Factory, Madhepura
- Integral Coach Factory, Chennai
- Modern Coach Factory, Raebareli
- Rail Coach Factory, Kapurthala
- Rail Wheel Factory, Yelahanka
- Rail Wheel Plant, Bela
- Titagarh Wagons, Titagarh
- List of locomotive builders by countries
