= Mumbai CSMT–SMVT Bengaluru Vande Bharat Sleeper Express =

Train in India

- Mumbai CSMT–SMVT Bengaluru Vande Bharat Sleeper Express arriving at Chhatrapati Shivaji Terminus

Overview
- Service type: Vande Bharat Sleeper Express
- Status: Active
- Locale: Maharashtra, Andhra Pradesh and Karnataka
- First service: 1 November 2026; 13 days ago (Inaugural) 2 November 2026; 12 days ago (Commercial)
- Current operator: South Western Railways (SWR)
- Ridership: 823; one way (per journey)

Route
- Termini: Chhatrapati Shivaji Terminus (CSMT); Sir M. Visvesvaraya Terminal (SMVB)
- Stops: 8
- Distance travelled: 1,115 km (693 mi)
- Average journey time: 15h 50m
- Service frequency: 6 days in a week
- Train number: 27651 / 27652
- Lines used: Mumbai CSMT–Pune–Solapur line; Solapur–Guntakal line Towards (Kalaburagi Junction, Raichur Junction); Guntakal–SMVT Bengaluru line

On-board services
- Classes: AC First Class; AC 2-tier AC 3-tier
- Seating arrangements: No
- Sleeping arrangements: Yes
- Catering facilities: Available
- Observation facilities: Large Windows
- Baggage facilities: Available

Technical
- Rolling stock: Vande Bharat (sleeper trainset)
- Track gauge: Indian gauge 1,676 mm (5 ft 6 in) broad gauge
- Electrification: 25 kV 50 Hz AC overhead line
- Operating speed: 130 km/h (81 mph)(Max.); 70 km/h (43 mph) (Avg.)
- Track owner: Indian Railways
- Rake maintenance: SMVT Bengaluru (SMVB)
Route map
↓ 27651 • 27652 ↑

The 27651 / 27652 Mumbai CSMT–SMVT Bengaluru Vande Bharat Sleeper Express is India's 3rd AC sleeper semi-high speed train. It belongs to South Western Railway zone and runs between the city Mumbai CSMT of Maharashtra and SMVT Bengaluru of Karnataka in India.

This express train was inaugurated on 1 November 2026 by Railway Minister Ashwini Vaishnaw.

== Overview ==
- The Vande Bharat Sleeper train is India's long-distance sleeper variant of the Vande Bharat train series, designed for overnight travel with fully air-conditioned sleeper coaches and modern amenities.
- The first rake's carbody structure was inaugurated on 9 March 2024 at the BEML Ltd manufacturing facility in Bangalore, marking the beginning of production.
- The prototype and components were developed and assembled by Bharat Earth Movers Limited (BEML) using technology from the Integral Coach Factory (ICF).
- After comprehensive trials, including high-speed runs up to 180 km/h, the train was certified for passenger service.
- Indian Railways officially announced that the Vande Bharat Sleeper train will operate between Mumbai CSMT (Maharashtra) and SMVT Bengaluru (Karnataka).
- The train runs at a maximum speed of 130 km/h (81 mph) between Pune and Bengaluru.
- It is considered as the most premium train of South Western Railway and among the most premium trains of Indian Railways. It receives the highest priority in its route. It is also the fastest train to connect through Kalyan, Pune, Solapur, Kalaburagi Junction, Yadgir, Raichur, Guntakal Junction and Anantapur.

== Schedule ==
27651 / 27652 Mumbai CSMT – SMVT Bengaluru Vande Bharat Sleeper Express Schedule
Train type	Vande Bharat Sleeper Express
Distance	1,115 km
Average speed	~70 km/h (27651) / ~69 km/h (27652)
Journey time (CSMT → SMVB)	~15 hrs 50 mins
Journey time (SMVB → CSMT)	~16 hrs 10 mins
Classes available	AC 3-Tier, AC 2-Tier, First Class AC
Operating days	Six days a week
Service pattern	EX–Mumbai CSMT except Tuesday; EX–SMVT Bengaluru except Monday
Operator	South Western Railway

== Route and halts ==
Mumbai CSMT–SMVT Bengaluru–Mumbai CSMT Vande Bharat Sleeper Express
27651 Mumbai CSMT → SMVT Bengaluru				27652 SMVT Bengaluru → Mumbai CSMT			
Station	Day	Arr.	Dep.	Station	Day	Arr.	Dep.
Mumbai CSMT	1	—	20:10	SMVT Bengaluru	1	—	19:45
Kalyan Junction	1	20:48	20:50	Anantapur	1	22:28	22:30
Pune Junction	1	23:40	23:45	Guntakal Junction	1	23:20	23:25
Solapur	2	03:00	03:05	Raichur Junction	2	01:03	01:05
Kalaburagi Junction	2	04:13	04:15	Yadgir	2	01:43	01:45
Yadgir	2	05:08	05:10	Kalaburagi Junction	2	03:08	03:10
Raichur Junction	2	06:03	06:05	Solapur	2	04:20	04:25
Guntakal Junction	2	07:30	07:35	Pune Junction	2	08:00	08:05
Anantapur	2	08:38	08:40	Kalyan Junction	2	10:42	10:44
SMVT Bengaluru	2	12:00	—	Mumbai CSMT	2	11:55	—

== Rake formation ==
Abbreviations

- DTC – Driving Trailer Coach
- NDTC – Non-Driving Trailer Coach
- MC – Motor Coach
- MC2 – Motor Coach with electrical change-over switch
- TC – Trailer Coach having Pantograph
- 3AC – Three-Tier AC class
- 2AC – Two-Tier AC class
- 1AC – First AC class

Rake Formation of 16 coach Vande Bharat sleeper (BEML make)
Sr. No.	1	2	3	4	5	6	7	8	9	10	11	12	13	14	15	16
Basic Power Units	Unit 1				Unit 2				Unit 3				Unit 4			
Power Configuration	DTC	MC	TC	MC2	MC	TC	MC2	NDTC	NDTC	MC2	TC	MC	MC2	TC	MC	DTC
Class	3AC				2AC	3AC	2AC	1AC	2AC		3AC					
Coach No.	B1	B2	B3	B4	A1	B5	A2	H1	A3	A4	B6	B7	B8	B9	B10	B11
Seating Capacity	28	67	55	67	48	55	48	24	44	48	55	67	67	55	67	28

Class	Coaches	Total seats
3AC	11	611
2AC	4	188
1AC	1	24
Total	16	823

- Primary Maintenance – SMVT Bengaluru

=== Fare structure ===
The one-way fare for the Vande Bharat Sleeper Express (Mumbai CSMT–SMVT Bengaluru) / (SMVT Bengaluru–Mumbai CSMT) is as follows:

Besides, the train will have no provision for RAC or Tatkal tickets, and the minimum chargeable distance would be 400 km, even if less distance is covered by the passengers.

One-way fare structure
Class	Rate/KM	Fare (INR)
AC 3-tier	₹2.40	₹2,750
AC 2-tier	₹3.10	₹3,550
First Class AC	₹3.80	₹4,350

== Testing and trials ==
In December 2025, the Vande Bharat sleeper trainset successfully completed high-speed trial runs on the Kota–Nagda section of the Indian Railways network. During the trials, the train achieved speeds of around 184 km/h under the supervision of the Commissioner of Railway Safety (CRS).

Union Railway Minister Ashwini Vaishnaw shared a video of the trial on social media, highlighting the train's stability and ride quality at high speed. As part of the demonstration, glasses filled with water were placed inside the coach and were reported to remain steady throughout the run, indicating minimal vibration.

According to Indian Railways officials, the successful trials are part of the certification process for the Vande Bharat sleeper trainset, which is designed for long-distance overnight travel and has a maximum design speed of 200 km/h.

== See also ==
- Semi-high-speed rail in India
- Vande Bharat (trainset)
- Namo Bharat (trainset)
- Amrit Bharat (trainset)
