= Varanasi–New Delhi Vande Bharat Sleeper Express =

Train in India

- Varanasi–New Delhi Vande Bharat Sleeper Express departing at Varanasi Junction

Overview
- Service type: Vande Bharat Sleeper Express
- Status: Active
- Locale: Uttar Pradesh and New Delhi
- First service: 31 October 2026; 7 days ago (Inaugural) 2 November 2026; 5 days ago (Commercial)
- Current operator: Northern Railways (NR)
- Ridership: 823; one way (per journey)

Route
- Termini: Varanasi Junction (BSB); New Delhi (NDLS)
- Stops: 6
- Distance travelled: 759 km (472 mi)
- Average journey time: 9h 20m
- Service frequency: 6 days in a week
- Train number: 27421 / 27422
- Lines used: Varanasi–Prayagraj line; Prayagraj–Kanpur line; Towards (Ghaziabad Junction) Kanpur–New Delhi line

On-board services
- Classes: AC First Class; AC 2-tier AC 3-tier
- Seating arrangements: No
- Sleeping arrangements: Yes
- Catering facilities: Available
- Observation facilities: Large Windows
- Baggage facilities: Available

Technical
- Rolling stock: Vande Bharat (sleeper trainset)
- Track gauge: Indian gauge 1,676 mm (5 ft 6 in) broad gauge
- Electrification: 25 kV 50 Hz AC overhead line
- Operating speed: 130 km/h (81 mph)(Max.); 80 km/h (50 mph) (Avg.)
- Track owner: Indian Railways
- Rake maintenance: New Delhi (NDLS)
Route map
↓ 27421 • 27422 ↑

The 27421 / 27422 Varanasi–New Delhi Vande Bharat Sleeper Express is India's 2nd AC sleeper semi-high speed train. It belongs to Northern Railway zone and runs between the city Varanasi Junction of Uttar Pradesh and New Delhi in India.

The express train was inaugurated on 31 October 2026 by Chief Minister of Uttar Pradesh Yogi Adityanath and Railway Minister Ashwini Vaishnaw.

== Overview ==
- The Vande Bharat Sleeper train is India's long-distance sleeper variant of the Vande Bharat train series, designed for overnight travel with fully air-conditioned sleeper coaches and modern amenities.
- The first rake's carbody structure was inaugurated on 9 March 2024 at the BEML Ltd manufacturing facility in Bangalore, marking the beginning of production.
- The prototype and components were developed and assembled by Bharat Earth Movers Limited (BEML) at its Bangalore facility using technology from the Integral Coach Factory (ICF).
- After comprehensive trials, including high-speed runs up to 180 km/h, the trainset was certified for commercial passenger service.
- Indian Railways officially announced that the third Vande Bharat Sleeper Express train will operate between Varanasi Junction (Uttar Pradesh) and New Delhi.
- The train runs at a maximum speed of 130 km/h between Prayagraj and Ghaziabad.
- It is considered as the most premium train of Northern Railway and among the most premium trains of Indian Railways. It receives the highest priority in its route. It is also the fastest train to connect Varanasi to Prayagraj, Kanpur, Ghaziabad and New Delhi.

== Schedule ==
27421 / 27422 Varanasi–New Delhi–Varanasi Vande Bharat Sleeper Express Schedule
Train type	Vande Bharat Sleeper Express
Distance	759 km
Average speed	~81 km/h (27421) / ~80 km/h (27422)
Journey time (BSB → NDLS)	~9 hrs 20 mins
Journey time (NDLS → BSB)	~9 hrs 30 mins
Classes available	AC 3-Tier, AC 2-Tier, First Class AC
Operating days	Six days a week
Service pattern	EX–Varanasi except Friday; EX–New Delhi except Saturday
Operator	Northern Railway

== Route and halts ==
Varanasi–New Delhi–Varanasi Vande Bharat Sleeper Express :
27421 BSB → NDLS				27422 NDLS → BSB			
Station	Day	Arr.	Dep.	Station	Day	Arr.	Dep.
Varanasi Junction	1	—	20:50	New Delhi	1	—	21:40
Prayagraj Junction	1	22:35	22:40	Ghaziabad Junction	1	22:13	22:15
Kanpur Central	2	00:40	00:45	Aligarh Junction	1	23:20	23:22
Aligarh Junction	2	03:55	03:57	Kanpur Central	2	02:45	02:50
Ghaziabad Junction	2	05:25	05:27	Prayagraj Junction	2	05:05	05:10
New Delhi	2	06:10	—	Varanasi Junction	2	07:10	—

== Rake formation ==
Abbreviations

- DTC – Driving Trailer Coach
- NDTC – Non-Driving Trailer Coach
- MC – Motor Coach
- MC2 – Motor Coach with electrical change-over switch
- TC – Trailer Coach having Pantograph
- 3AC – Three-Tier AC class
- 2AC – Two-Tier AC class
- 1AC – First AC class

Rake Formation of 16 coach Vande Bharat sleeper
Sr. No.	1	2	3	4	5	6	7	8	9	10	11	12	13	14	15	16
Basic Power Units	Unit 1				Unit 2				Unit 3				Unit 4			
Power Configuration	DTC	MC	TC	MC2	MC	TC	MC2	NDTC	NDTC	MC2	TC	MC	MC2	TC	MC	DTC
Class	3AC				2AC	3AC	2AC	1AC	2AC		3AC					
Coach No.	B1	B2	B3	B4	A1	B5	A2	H1	A3	A4	B6	B7	B8	B9	B10	B11
Seating Capacity	28	67	55	67	48	55	48	24	44	48	55	67	67	55	67	28

Class	Coaches	Total seats
3AC	11	611
2AC	4	188
1AC	1	24
Total	16	823

- Primary Maintenance – New Delhi

=== Fare structure ===
The one-way fare for the Vande Bharat Sleeper Express (Varanasi–New Delhi) / (New Delhi–Varanasi) is as follows:

Besides, the train will have no provision for RAC or Tatkal tickets, and the minimum chargeable distance would be 400 km, even if less distance is covered by the passengers.

One-way fare structure
Class	Rate/KM	Fare (INR)
AC 3-tier	₹2.40	₹2,050
AC 2-tier	₹3.10	₹2,600
First Class AC	₹3.80	₹3,200

== Testing and trials ==
In December 2025, the Vande Bharat sleeper trainset successfully completed high-speed trial runs on the Kota–Nagda section of the Indian Railways network. During the trials, the train achieved speeds of around 180 km/h under the supervision of the Commissioner of Railway Safety (CRS).

Union Railway Minister Ashwini Vaishnaw shared a video of the trial on social media, highlighting the train's stability and ride quality at high speed. As part of the demonstration, glasses filled with water were placed inside the coach and were reported to remain steady throughout the run, indicating minimal vibration.

According to Indian Railways officials, the successful trials are part of the certification process for the Vande Bharat sleeper trainset, which is designed for long-distance overnight travel and has a maximum design speed of 200 km/h.

== See also ==
- Semi-high-speed rail in India
- Vande Bharat (trainset)
- Namo Bharat (trainset)
- Amrit Bharat (trainset)
