= Howrah–Kamakhya Vande Bharat Sleeper Express =

Train in India

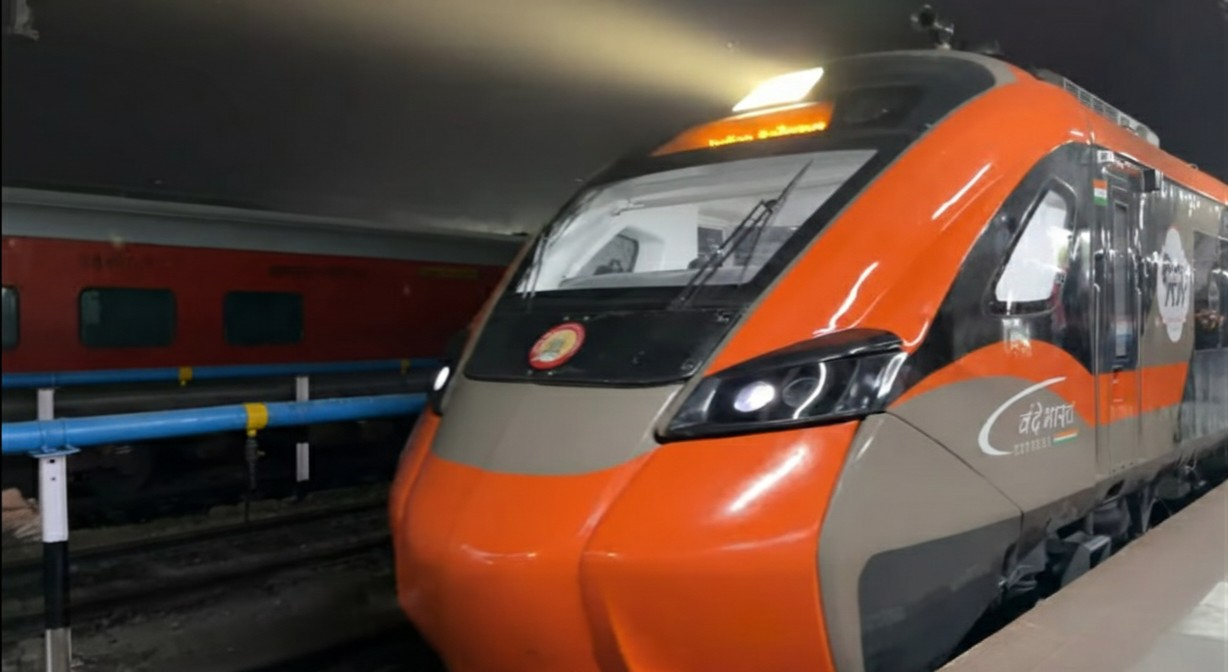
- Howrah–Kamakhya Vande Bharat Sleeper Express arriving at Kamakhya Junction

Overview
- Service type: Vande Bharat Sleeper Express
- Status: Active
- Locale: West Bengal and Assam
- First service: 17 January 2026; 9 months ago (Inaugural) 23 January 2026; 9 months ago (Commercial)
- Current operator: Northeast Frontier Railways (NFR)
- Ridership: 823; one way (per journey)

Route
- Termini: Howrah Junction (HWH); Kamakhya Junction (KYQ)
- Stops: 13
- Distance travelled: 968 km (601 mi)
- Average journey time: 14h
- Service frequency: 6 days in a week
- Train number: 27575 / 27576
- Lines used: Howrah–New Jalpaiguri line (BAK loop); New Jalpaiguri–New Bongaigaon line; New Bongaigaon–Rangiya–Kamakhya line

On-board services
- Classes: AC First Class; AC 2-tier AC 3-tier
- Seating arrangements: No
- Sleeping arrangements: Yes
- Catering facilities: Available
- Observation facilities: Large windows
- Baggage facilities: Available

Technical
- Rolling stock: Vande Bharat (sleeper trainset)
- Track gauge: Indian gauge 1,676 mm (5 ft 6 in) broad gauge
- Electrification: 25 kV 50 Hz AC overhead line
- Operating speed: 110 km/h (68 mph) (Max.); 69 km/h (43 mph) (Avg.)
- Track owner: Indian Railways
- Rake maintenance: Howrah Junction (HWH)
Route map
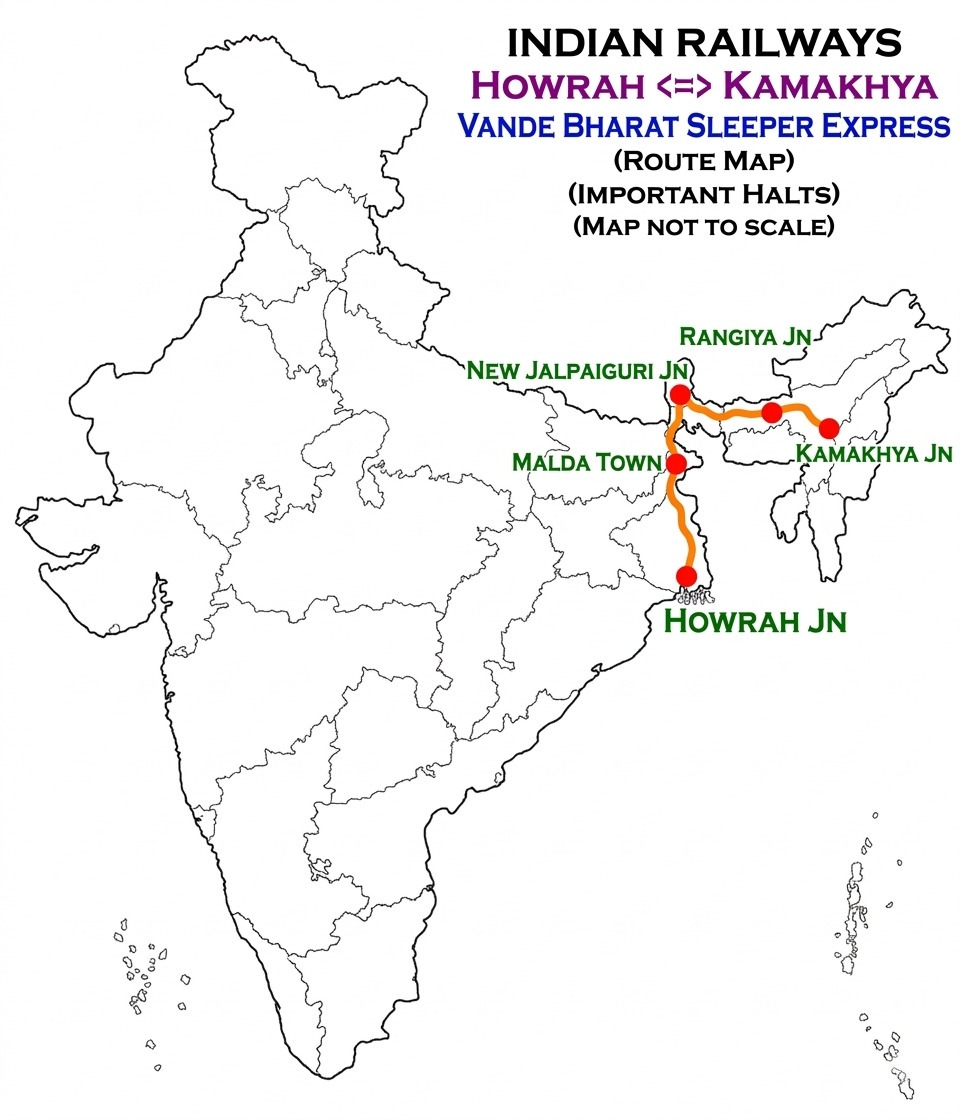
↓ 27575 • 27576 ↑

The 27575 / 27576 Howrah–Kamakhya Vande Bharat Sleeper Express is India's 1st AC sleeper semi-high speed train. It belongs to Northeast Frontier Railway zone and runs between the city Howrah Junction of West Bengal and Kamakhya Junction of Assam in India.

The express train was inaugurated on 17 January 2026 by Prime Minister Narendra Modi and Railway Minister Ashwini Vaishnaw.

== Overview ==
- The Vande Bharat Sleeper train is India's first long-distance sleeper variant of the Vande Bharat train series, designed for overnight travel with fully air-conditioned sleeper coaches and modern amenities.
- The first rake's carbody structure was inaugurated on 9 March 2024 at the BEML Ltd manufacturing facility in Bangalore, marking the beginning of production.
- The prototype and components were developed and assembled by Bharat Earth Movers Limited (BEML) using technology from the Integral Coach Factory (ICF).
- After comprehensive trials, including high-speed runs up to 180 km/h, the train was certified for passenger service.
- Indian Railways officially announced that the first Vande Bharat Sleeper train will operate between Howrah (West Bengal) and Kamakhya Junction (Guwahati, Assam).
- The train would run at a maximum speed of 110 km/h from Bandel on the Howrah–New Jalpaiguri section (BAK loop) and New Jalpaiguri–New Bongaigaon section, to Changsari on the New Bongaigaon–Rangiya–Kamakhya line.
- It is considered as the most premium train of Eastern Railway and among the most premium trains of Indian Railways. It receives the highest priority in its route. It is also the fastest train to connect Kolkata to New Jalpaiguri, New Alipurduar and Kamakhya.

== Schedule ==
27575 / 27576 Howrah–Kamakhya–Howrah Vande Bharat Sleeper Express Schedule
| Train type | Vande Bharat Sleeper Express |
| Distance | 968 km (27575) / 968 km (27576) |
| Average speed | ~69 km/h (27575) / ~69 km/h (27576) |
| Journey time (HWH → KYQ) | ~14 hrs |
| Journey time (KYQ → HWH) | ~14 hrs |
| Classes available | AC 3-Tier, AC 2-Tier, First Class AC |
| Operating days | Six days a week |
| Service pattern | EX–Howrah except Thursday; EX–Kamakhya except Wednesday |
| Operator | Northeast Frontier Railway / Eastern Railway |

== Route and halts ==
Howrah–Kamakhya–Howrah Vande Bharat Sleeper Express :
| 27575 HWH → KYQ | | | | 27576 KYQ → HWH | | | |
| Station | Day | Arr. | Dep. | Station | Day | Arr. | Dep. |
|---|---|---|---|---|---|---|---|
| Howrah Junction | 1 | SRC | 18:20 | Kamakhya Junction | 1 | SRC | 18:15 |
| Bandel Junction | 1 | 18:56 | 18:58 | Rangiya Junction | 1 | 18:48 | 18:50 |
| Nabadwip Dham | 1 | 19:36 | 19:38 | New Bongaigaon Junction | 1 | 20:08 | 20:10 |
| Katwa Junction | 1 | 20:03 | 20:05 | New Alipurduar | 1 | 21:23 | 21:25 |
| Azimganj Junction | 1 | 20:50 | 20:55 | New Cooch Behar Junction | 1 | 21:40 | 21:42 |
| New Farakka Junction | 1 | 21:48 | 21:50 | Jalpaiguri Road | 1 | 22:55 | 22:57 |
| Malda Town | 1 | 22:50 | 23:00 | New Jalpaiguri Junction | 1 | 23:30 | 23:40 |
| Aluabari Road Junction | 2 | 00:58 | 01:00 | Aluabari Road Junction | 2 | 00:22 | 00:24 |
| New Jalpaiguri Junction | 2 | 01:40 | 01:50 | Malda Town | 2 | 03:25 | 03:35 |
| Jalpaiguri Road | 2 | 02:20 | 02:22 | New Farakka Junction | 2 | 04:05 | 04:07 |
| New Cooch Behar Junction | 2 | 03:30 | 03:32 | Azimganj Junction | 2 | 04:57 | 05:02 |
| New Alipurduar | 2 | 03:48 | 03:50 | Katwa Junction | 2 | 05:46 | 05:48 |
| New Bongaigaon Junction | 2 | 05:20 | 05:22 | Nabadwip Dham | 2 | 06:13 | 06:15 |
| Rangiya Junction | 2 | 06:50 | 06:52 | Bandel Junction | 2 | 06:58 | 07:00 |
| Kamakhya Junction | 2 | 08:20 | DSTN | Howrah Junction | 2 | 08:15 | DSTN |

== Rake formation ==
Abbreviations

- DTC – Driving Trailer Coach
- NDTC – Non-Driving Trailer Coach
- MC – Motor Coach
- MC2 – Motor Coach with electrical change-over switch
- TC – Trailer Coach having Pantograph
- 3AC – Three-Tier AC class
- 2AC – Two-Tier AC class
- 1AC – First AC class

Rake Formation of 16 coach Vande Bharat sleeper (BEML make)
| Sr. No. | 1 | 2 | 3 | 4 | 5 | 6 | 7 | 8 | 9 | 10 | 11 | 12 | 13 | 14 | 15 | 16 |
|---|---|---|---|---|---|---|---|---|---|---|---|---|---|---|---|---|
| Basic Power Units | Unit 1 | | | | Unit 2 | | | | Unit 3 | | | | Unit 4 | | | |
| Power Configuration | DTC | MC | TC | MC2 | MC | TC | MC2 | NDTC | NDTC | MC2 | TC | MC | MC2 | TC | MC | DTC |
| Class | 3AC | | | | 2AC | 3AC | 2AC | 1AC | 2AC | | 3AC | | | | | |
| Coach No. | B1 | B2 | B3 | B4 | A1 | B5 | A2 | H1 | A3 | A4 | B6 | B7 | B8 | B9 | B10 | B11 |
| Seating Capacity | 28 | 67 | 55 | 67 | 48 | 55 | 48 | 24 | 44 | 48 | 55 | 67 | 67 | 55 | 67 | 28 |

| Class | Coaches | Total seats |
|---|---|---|
| 3AC | 11 | 611 |
| 2AC | 4 | 188 |
| 1AC | 1 | 24 |
| Total | 16 | 823 |

- Primary Maintenance – Howrah

=== Fare structure ===
The one-way fare for the Vande Bharat Sleeper Express (Howrah–Kamakhya) / (Kamakhya–Howrah) is as follows: Besides, the train will have no provision for RAC or Tatkal tickets, and the minimum chargeable distance would be 400 km, even if less distance is covered by the passengers.

One-way fare structure
| Class | Rate/KM | Fare (INR) |
|---|---|---|
| AC 3-tier | ₹2.40 | ₹2,435 |
| AC 2-tier | ₹3.10 | ₹3,145 |
| First Class AC | ₹3.80 | ₹3,855 |

== Testing and trials ==
In December 2025, the Vande Bharat sleeper trainset successfully completed high-speed trial runs on the Kota–Nagda section of the Indian Railways network. During the trials, the train achieved speeds of around 180 km/h under the supervision of the Commissioner of Railway Safety (CRS).

Union Railway Minister Ashwini Vaishnaw shared a video of the trial on social media, highlighting the train's stability and ride quality at high speed. As part of the demonstration, glasses filled with water were placed inside the coach and were reported to remain steady throughout the run, indicating minimal vibration.

According to Indian Railways officials, the successful trials are part of the certification process for the Vande Bharat sleeper trainset, which is designed for long-distance overnight travel and has a maximum design speed of 200 km/h.

== See also ==
- Semi-high-speed rail in India
- Vande Bharat (trainset)
- Namo Bharat (trainset)
- Amrit Bharat (trainset)
