= Vande Bharat (disambiguation) =

Vande Bharat Express is series of Indian semi-high speed EMU chair car train services.

Vande Bharat may also refer to

- Vande Bharat (trainset), trainset used for the Vande Bharat Express
- Vande Bharat Sleeper Express, sleeper version of the Vande Bharat service
- Vande Bharat Sleeper (trainset), trainset used for the sleeper version of the Vande Bharat service
- Vande Bharat Mission, Indian government response to the COVID-19 pandemic
- Vande Bharat Via USA, a 2025 Gujarati-language film
