= Motor coach =

Motor coach can refer to

- Motor bus, under the Canadian English usage of the term "coach"
- Motorcoach, a long-distance, or "over the road" highway bus
- Motor coach (rail), a powered railway vehicle able to carry passengers and haul trailers
- Motorhome, a type of recreational vehicle that offers mobile living accommodation
