= B28 trainset =

Upcoming Indian high speed train type

B28
- Manufacturer: BEML Limited
- Designers: ICF and BEML Limited
- Assembly: Bengaluru (BEML facility)
- Number built: 2 prototypes
- Formation: 8-car trainset
- Capacity: Approximately 580 seats (estimated)
- Operator: National High Speed Rail Corporation Limited (for trials)

Specifications
- Maximum speed: 250 km/h (160 mph) (operational); 280 km/h (170 mph) (design)
- Traction system: Distributed traction (IGBT-based)
- HVAC: Pressurized units with enhanced filtration
- Braking system: Microprocessor-controlled
- Track gauge: 1,435 mm (4 ft 8 1/2 in)

Notes/references
- Contract value: ₹866.87 crore

The Bharat28 or B28 (also referred to as B28 trainset, Train B28 or Vande Bullet) is a high-speed trainset under development by BEML Limited in partnership with the Integral Coach Factory (ICF). It is intended for trial operations on the Mumbai–Ahmedabad high-speed rail corridor. The trainsets are designed for an operational speed of 250 km/h and a maximum design speed of 280 km/h. The Railways also plans a B35 trainset with a maximum speed design of 350 km/h.

== Background ==
The Mumbai–Ahmedabad high-speed rail corridor was planned to use Japanese E5 Series Shinkansen trainsets, but negotiations were terminated in 2024 over cost and modification disputes for Indian conditions. Thereafter, the Integral Coach Factory (ICF) tendered for indigenous prototypes. BEML was the sole bidder and was awarded the contract at a lower per-coach cost. Primary rolling stock for the corridor was originally intended to be the Japanese E10 Series Shinkansen, while the B28 prototypes were intended for trials and development work., though later the railway ministry decided on using the B28 from initial operations onward as well.

=== Formation ===
According to BEML procurement technical specifications, the Train B28 trainset is configured as an 8-car rake consisting of two 4-car basic units with distributed traction. The standard formation layout is structured as follows:

Car No.	1	2	3	4	5	6	7	8
Coupling	Automatic (External)	Semi-permanent						Automatic (External)
Designation	DTC1	MC1	TC1(PRM)	MC1	MC1	TC2(Ex)	MC1	DTC2
Type	Driving Trailer	Motor Car	Trailer Car (PRM)	Motor Car	Motor Car	Executive Trailer	Motor Car	Driving Trailer

== Development ==
In October 2024, the Integral Coach Factory awarded BEML a contract valued at ₹866.87 crore to design, manufacture and commission two eight-car high-speed trainsets. As of February 2026, preliminary design review and detailed design review for underframe, car body and bogie were nearing completion. Manufacturing of car bodies and structural elements is in progress at BEML's Bengaluru facility. A full-scale mock-up is scheduled for unveiling in the first quarter of 2026. The first prototype is targeted for rollout by December 2026, with the second in 2027. The prototypes will undergo static tests, oscillation trials, structural validation (including full car body squeeze tests) and high-speed trials over 7–8 months before certification.

On 2 September 2025, Knorr-Bremse announced the signing of an equipment contract with BEML to supply the braking and entrance systems along with air conditioning and sanitary systems for the two prototypes of B28 trains. The firm is also establishing a manufacturing facility near Chennai with deliveries to begin in 2026. BEML has also initiated efforts to identify Indian suppliers for passenger seats and interior panels.

On 28 February 2026, the National High Speed Rail Corporation Limited (NHSRCL) issued a single tender enquiry (Package No. MAHSR-BRS-1) to BEML Limited for the design, manufacture, supply, testing, commissioning and comprehensive maintenance of rolling stock and allied works for the Mumbai–Ahmedabad high-speed rail corridor. The tender follows a single-stage two-envelope bidding procedure. Bid submissions were scheduled from 11 to 16 March 2026 (09:00–15:00 hrs IST) and technical bids were to open on 17 March 2026 at 15:00 hrs. This package builds on the earlier October 2024 contract awarded by the Integral Coach Factory to BEML for the construction of two prototype trainsets.

In March 2026, the Parliamentary Standing Committee on Railways tabled its report on the Demands for Grants (2026–27) of the Ministry of Railways. The report included details from the Ministry regarding the Mumbai–Ahmedabad High-Speed Rail project. According to the Ministry's submission, initial commercial operations on the Surat–Vapi section (approximately 97 km) are planned for August 2027 using the B28 trainsets manufactured by BEML. The Ministry stated that the B28 trainsets have a design speed of 280 km/h, with initial operations at 250 km/h. Future upgrades to 320–350 km/h may be possible. The signalling system for this section will use ETCS Level 2. The committee's report also noted the project's overall cost escalation and efforts towards indigenisation of high-speed rail technology.

On 20 March 2026, Moneycontrol reported that the consortium of BEML and Medha Servo Drives was likely to receive an order for 16 additional high-speed trainsets for the Mumbai–Ahmedabad high-speed rail project. The proposed order is estimated to be worth approximately ₹4,000 crore (US$420 million) in total (around ₹250 crore (US$26 million) per trainset) and is expected to include a seven-year maintenance contract. These additional trainsets are planned to follow the same basic design as the two initial prototypes already under development by BEML, with possible minor enhancements to be incorporated based on testing and operational feedback. The manufacturing of the first two prototypes was yet to commence, leading to a delay in the prototype rollout. The first prototype was then expected in March 2027, with the additional 16 trainsets to follow later. This potential order forms part of the broader plan to indigenise high-speed rolling stock for the corridor, following the initial October 2024 contract awarded to BEML by the Integral Coach Factory for the two prototypes.

On 25 April 2026, the Minister of Railways, Ashwini Vaishnaw, inaugurated a facility at BEML's Aditya facility at Bengaluru for the development and production of B-28 coaches and the trainset. The first trainset is scheduled to be manufactured by March 2027.

On 18 May 2026, the Ministry of Railways displayed a graphic design of the proposed trainset at the Rail Bhawan in New Delhi. Following media coverage of the layout, the Railway Board clarified that the image was representational and that the final aerodynamic profile would be finalized during physical shell integration at the BEML facility.

In mid-June 2026, BEML management stated that the first prototype trainset was expected to be ready in early 2027. The trainset was planned to undergo testing at the company's facility before transfer to the Surat depot for further trials, with the overall testing process estimated to take four to six months.

In July 2026, the Ministry of External Affairs stated that initial operations on the Mumbai–Ahmedabad high-speed rail corridor would begin with Indian high-speed trains, while Japan was expected to provide E10 series Shinkansen trains in the early 2030s. Railway Minister Ashwini Vaishnaw announced that the next indigenous high-speed train would be designed for a speed of 350 km/h, with design work expected to commence within six months.

In August 2026, the Parliamentary Standing Committee on Railways, in its 10th report, called for accelerated indigenisation of high-speed rail components and expanded skill development programmes.

On 18 September 2026, BEML in a regulatory filling revealed it had secured an order worth ₹5,400 crore (US$560 million) for the supply of 16 B28 trainsets, its maintenance and allied works from NHSRCL.

On 1 November 2026, Union Minister of Railways Ashwini Vaishnaw visited the BEML facility in Bengaluru and inspected the manufacturing progress of the B28 trainset. During the visit, the car-body structure was undergoing a squeeze test at loads of 1,500 kilonewtons. Vaishnaw stated that all major components were being produced, integrated and tested, with emphasis on quality and adherence to international standards, and that managing atmospheric pressure differentials created at high speeds was a critical aspect of the testing.

== Specifications ==
The trainsets are designed for temperatures from −10 °C to 55 °C, high humidity, heavy rainfall, dust and corrosive environments. They include dust filters and enhanced pressurized air-conditioning. The design supports an average daily run of approximately 2,000 km. The trainsets use distributed traction with IGBT-based converters, bolsterless bogies and microprocessor-controlled braking. Safety features include compliance with EN 45545 fire norms and ETCS Level-2 signalling compatibility.

== Components and procurement ==
The procurement of specialized components for the B28 prototypes is currently being managed through the Government e-Marketplace (GeM) and the Directorate General of Commercial Intelligence and Statistics (DGCI&S). Initial phases of the project involved securing infrastructure for vehicle-level body shell testing and the acquisition of dedicated test rigs. This was followed by the procurement of bogie type tests to ensure adherence to established structural design standards.

Significant focus has been placed on the train's aerodynamic profile, with tenders issued for external components such as nose cones and specialized cable trays. Additional aerodynamic elements include the installation of custom roof cladding and protective underframe covers to minimize drag. The electrical infrastructure is further supported by the procurement of high-durability underframe cable trays.

Interior and operator-centric components comprise a major part of the recent procurement lists, including modular interior fittings. The driver's cabin has been outfitted with specific ergonomic features such as specialized footrests and high-impact cab side window glazing. Further cabin refinements include integrated control interface elements and specialized floor boarding.

Water and sanitation management systems for the trainset feature high-capacity fresh water tanks and advanced bio-digester units for waste processing. The passenger amenities are further enhanced by the inclusion of pressurized modular toilet systems designed for high-speed operation.

Safety and structural integrity are addressed through the procurement of evacuation bridges and emergency rope ladders. Various pieces of emergency gear have also been sourced along with high-grade SUS301L-ST stainless steel materials. Heavy industrial components such as underframe castings have been ordered through BEML’s procurement channels. Quality assurance is maintained through third-party weld assessments and strict adherence to a documented list of technical standards. Finally, mechanical support is provided by the acquisition of RS-6 stainless steel brackets.

== Suppliers ==
Key suppliers include Knorr-Bremse for braking systems, Medha for the Train Control and Management System (TCMS), Traktionssysteme Austria (TSA) for gearboxes, Compin Fainsa for passenger seats, Hanuk Fibre for interior panels and nose cone, and EC Engineering (Poland) for design validation consultancy.

== Interior and passenger facilities ==
The air-conditioned coaches include reclining or rotating seats, provisions for passengers with reduced mobility, entertainment systems, pressurized modular toilets, fresh water tanks and bio-digesters.

== Route and operations ==
The prototypes are intended for trials on the 508 km Mumbai–Ahmedabad high-speed rail corridor, with initial testing on the Surat–Vapi section. Trials are expected after certification in 2027. Partial commercial services on select sections may begin from August 2027, subject to approvals. These trainsets serve as prototypes for development and testing. Primary rolling stock for the corridor is the Japanese E10 Series Shinkansen.

== See also ==
- High-speed rail in India
- Mumbai–Ahmedabad high-speed rail corridor
- Amrit Bharat (trainset) – Indian push-pull trainsets
- Namo Bharat (trainset) – Indian electric multiple unit train used for regional rapid train services
- Vande Bharat (trainset) – Indian semi-high-speed EMU trainsets
- Vande Bharat Sleeper (trainset) – Semi high-speed EMU sleeper trainset of India
