= Vande Bharat Sleeper Express =

AC Sleeper series of Indian semi-high speed EMU train services

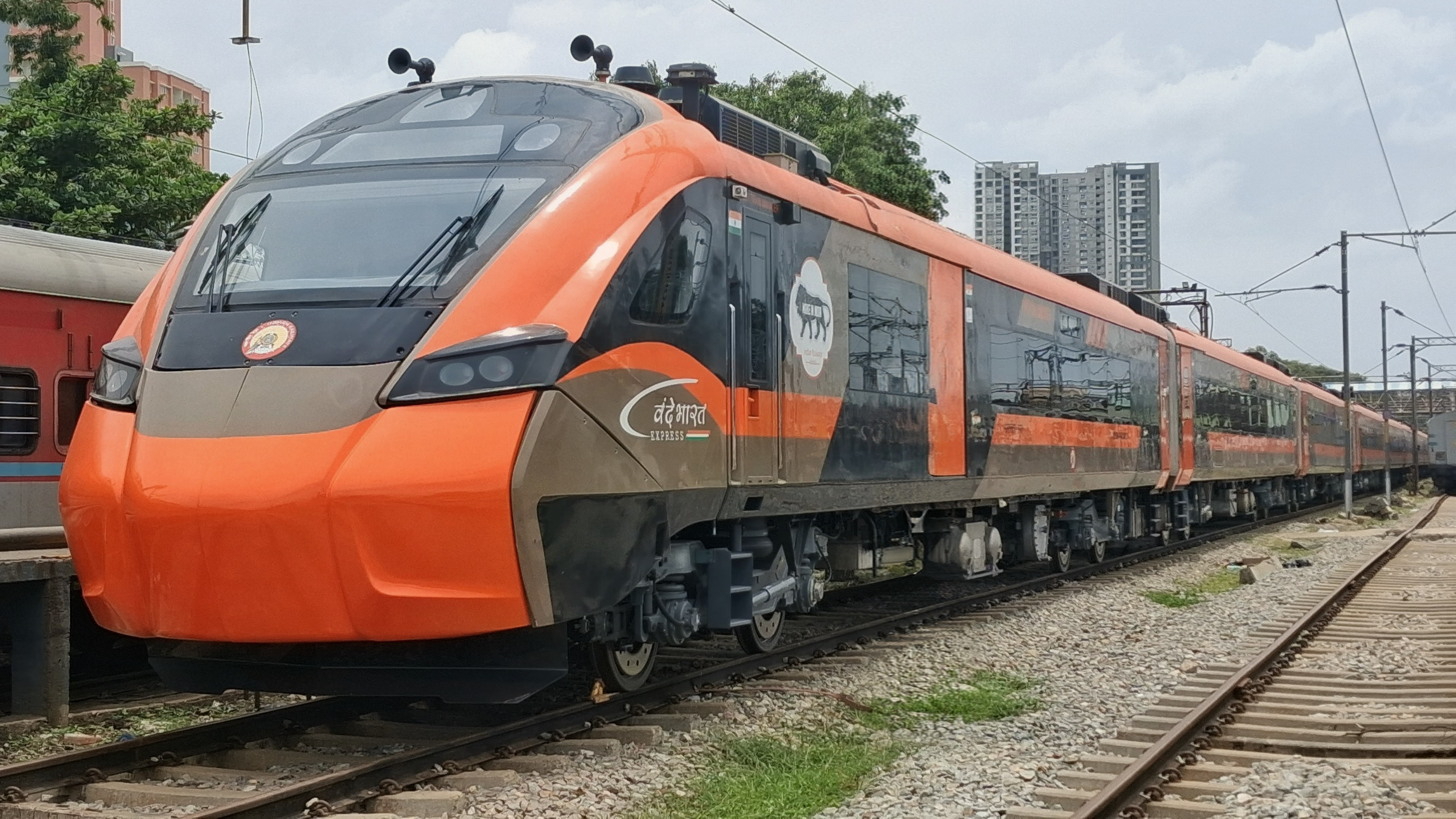
- Vande Bharat Sleeper Express at KSR Bengaluru City

Overview
- Service type: Inter-city semi-high-speed rail
- Status: Operational
- Predecessor: Rajdhani Express
- First service: 17 January 2026; 10 months ago
- Current operator: Indian Railways
- Website: indianrail.gov.in

Route
- Line used: 03

On-board services
- Classes: AC First (1A); AC 2 Tier (2A); AC 3 Tier (3A)
- Sleeping arrangements: Sleeping seats
- Catering facilities: On-board
- Observation facilities: Wide Windows
- Entertainment facilities: Infotainment system; Wi-Fi
- Other facilities: Automatic doors; Electric outlets; Reading lights; Smoke alarms; CCTV; Odour control; Sensor based water taps; Bio-vacuum toilets; Roller blinds

Technical
- Rolling stock: Vande Bharat (sleeper trainset)
- Track gauge: 1,676 mm (5 ft 6 in) broad gauge
- Electrification: 25 kV 50 Hz AC overhead line
- Operating speed: 184 km/h (114 mph) (maximum) 200 km/h (120 mph) (potential maximum)
- Average length: 16 coaches

The Vande Bharat Sleeper Express is a medium to long-distance Inter-city semi-high speed service by Indian Railways. It is a reserved, air-conditioned sleeper service connecting cities that are 800 km (500 mi) to 1,200 km (750 mi) apart. It is operated by self-propelling trainsets, designed and manufactured in India. The first prototype of the train set was rolled out by BEML in September 2024. The first service began operation on 17 January 2026.

== History ==
After the rollout of Vande Bharat trains that provided faster connectivity across short distances, Integral Coach Factory started developing a long-distance version of the trainset equipped with sleeper cars. The first prototype was rolled out by BEML in September 2024, and was expected to enter commercial service by January 2026.

== Rolling stock ==
The train uses electric multiple units capable of achieving semi-high speeds of 180 km/h (110 mph). The train includes a new aerodynamic front design made from high-strength materials for improved durability and reduced maintenance. Each trainset has sixteen cars, and is capable of accommodating up to 823 passengers.

== Facilities ==
The service is a reserved, air-conditioned sleeper service connecting cities that are 800 km (500 mi) to 1,200 km (750 mi) apart. It offers three classes of accommodation with one First AC (1A) coach, four Second AC (2A) and 11 Third AC (3A) coaches, which can accommodate 24, 188 and 611 passengers respectively. The coaches are equipped with electric outlets, reading lights, CCTV cameras, automatic doors, bio-vacuum toilets, sensor-based water taps, and passenger information system. It also contains fully air-conditioned locomotive cabins with dedicated toilets for train drivers. The trains are equipped with kavach train protection and emergency talk back systems. The service offers onboard catering with both vegetarian and non-vegetarian meal options.

== Services ==
The Vande Bharat Sleeper Express made its inaugural run on 17 January 2026. As of November 2026, three pairs (six services) are operational, connecting Howrah–Kamakhya, Varanasi–New Delhi, and Mumbai–Bengaluru. Indian Railways plans to manufacture 260 trainsets for phased induction into regular service based on demand and operational readiness.

Service	Train number	Zone	Distance	Travel time	Speed		Approved on	Inaugural run
Service	Train number	Zone	Distance	Travel time	Maximum (Note: Maximum permissible speed as approved by the Commissioner of Railway Safety)	Average	Approved on	Inaugural run
Howrah–Kamakhya	27575 / 27576	NFR	968 km (601 mi)	14h	110 km/h (68 mph)	69 km/h (43 mph)	02 January 2026	17 January 2026
Varanasi–New Delhi	27421 / 27422	NR	759 km (472 mi)	9h 20m	130 km/h (81 mph)	81 km/h (50 mph)	26 October 2026	31 October 2026
Mumbai CSMT–SMVT Bengaluru	27651 / 27652	SWR	1,113 km (692 mi)	15h 50m	130 km/h (81 mph)	70 km/h (43 mph)	02 October 2026	1 Nov 2026

== See also ==
- Rajdhani Express
- Uday Express
- Tejas Express
- Humsafar Express
- Amrit Bharat Express
- Vande Bharat Express
