= Skully Brandon =

Skully Brandon (born August 4, 1992) is an American actor, model, and content creator based in Los Angeles, California.

== Career ==
Brandon started acting in movies in 2024 and also worked in a 2025 Indian comedy movie Vande Bharat Via USA with Malhar Thakar. He was later signed by Innovative Artists Talent Agency.

He received 2025 World Entertainment Award (WEA) for the best viral video. In 2026, Brandon appeared in an AllSaints summer campaign.

== Filmography ==
Year	Title	Role
2024	Holiday for Hire	Shopper (uncredited)
2025	Vande Bharat Via USA	Simon
2026	The American	Bar Patron
