= Vande Bharat Via USA =

2025 Indian Gujarati drama comedy film

- Official Poster
- Directed by: Jaymin Patel
- Produced by: Alex Bhagat; Kishan Dholiya; Rutuja Mane; Himanshu Solanki
- Starring: Malhar Thakar; Pooja Jhaveri; Kelly Pearson
- Cinematography: Nandan Lawande; Rishabh Dudhedia
- Edited by: Rahul Bhole
- Music by: Parth Bharat Thakkar
- Production companies: Wardwizard Entertainment; Aasman Productions; Sake Spectacle; De Rio; Spacetime Moviies
- Distributed by: Rupam Entertainment Pvt Ltd
- Release date: 25 December 2025
- Running time: 127 minutes
- Country: India
- Language: Gujarati

Vande Bharat Via USA is a 2025 Indian Gujarati drama-comedy film directed by Jaymin Patel. The film stars Malhar Thakar, Pooja Jhaveri and Kelly Pearson in the lead roles. It is produced by Alex Bhagat, Kishan Dholiya, Rutuja Mane and Himanshu Solanki under the banners Wardwizard Entertainment, Aasman Productions, Sake Spectacle, De Rio and Spacetime Moviies. The film was theatrically released in India on 25 December 2025.

== Plot ==
Rohan, a young Gujarati immigrant living in Los Angeles, works multiple odd jobs while chasing his dream of obtaining a U.S permanent residency . His journey takes an unexpected turn as he becomes entangled in a series of humorous situations, complicated relationships and life-changing secrets. The story explores themes of ambition, family values, cultural identity and second chances.

== Cast ==
- Malhar Thakar as Rohan Thakkar
- Pooja Jhaveri as Eva Mehta
- Kiley Pearson as Jodie
- Asit Vyas as Harsh Mehta, Eva's father
- Alina Zhuravel as Rohan's friend
- Alex Baghat as Sameer Shah, Rohan's boss
- Skully Brandon as Simon
- Nikhil Dave as Nick, Rohan's friend
- Brian Duss as Martin
- Lorraine Kaiser as Jennifer, Jodie's mom
- Maya Lukina as Scarlett
- Amanda Kathryn Liguori as Officer Natalie Matthews
- Mahek as Mahek, Eva's friend
- Mita Vyas as Preeti, Eva's mother
- Henrie River as Yacht Captain
- Neil Wachs as Coffee Shop Patron

== Soundtrack ==
Vande Bharat Via USA

Studio album by Parth Bharat Thakkar
- Released: 2025
- Genre: Feature film soundtrack
- Length: 9:37
- Language: Gujarati
- Label: NJ Entertainment
External audio
- Vande Bharat Via USA Full Album on JioSaavn

=== Tracklist ===
All lyrics are written by Chirag Tripathi and Rutesh Patel; all music is composed by Kedar-Bhargav, Parth Bharat Thakkar, Prajaval Pandya and Param Bhagat

No.	Title	Lyrics	Music	Singer(s)	Length
1.	"Parevda"	Chirag Tripathi	Kedar Bhargav	Javed Ali	3:47
2.	"Love Everyday"	Chirag Tripathi	Parth Bharat Thakkar	Hetvi Pawani, Priya Doshi	3:52
3.	"Gaathe Na Gujarati"	Rutesh Patel	Prajaval Pandya, Param Bhagat	Rutesh Patel	1:58
Total length:					9:37

== Production ==
Principal photography for the film took place largely in the United States, with approximately 90–95 percent of the film shot at various locations in Los Angeles, California. Additional portions of the film were filmed in Ahmedabad and Vadodara, India.

== Marketing and release ==
The film was officially announced on 6 November 2025 with the motion poster. A teaser was released on 22 November 2025, followed by the official trailer on 4 December 2025 across social media platforms. The film was theatrically released on 25 December 2025, coinciding with Christmas.

== Reception ==
Dharmendra Thakur of Gujarati Jagran reviewed Vande Bharat Via USA and noted that the film presents a realistic portrayal of the challenges faced by Indians aspiring to settle in the United States, particularly highlighting the pursuit of social status and stability. The review described the film as an eye-opener for students and young aspirants, pointing to its depiction of legal complexities, social pressures, and the gap between expectations and reality abroad. Thakur also observed that certain dialogues resonated strongly with audiences on social media, while the performances of Malhar Thakar and Pooja Jhaveri, along with Parth Bharat Thakkar’s music, contributed to the film's appeal as a family-oriented drama that blends humour with emotional moments.

== See also ==
- List of Gujarati films of 2025
- List of Gujarati films
