= Pipelayer (vehicle) =

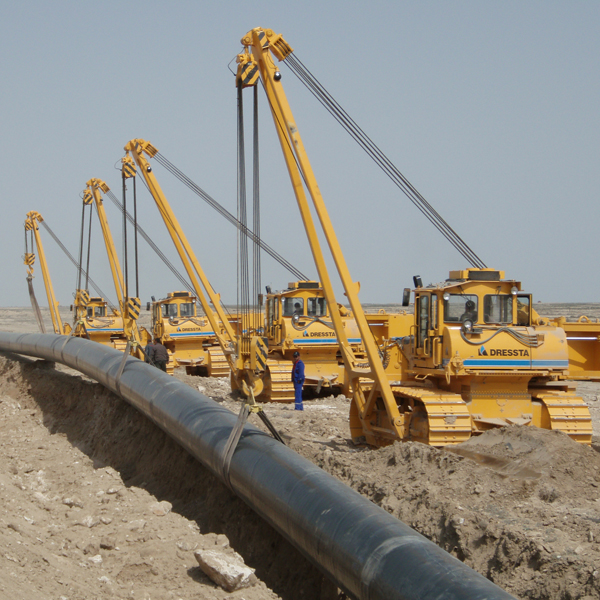
Pipelayers

A pipelayer or sideboom is a type of a construction vehicle used to lay pipes. It is used in the construction of oil, gas and water pipelines. They are also frequently used in the railroad industry to lift derailed cars and locomotives.

== Description ==
The lifting equipment of pipelayers includes:

- boom, mounted on the left side of the machine
- counterweights
- hydraulic hook and boom winches.

A pipelayer can also be equipped with accessories:

- crane (used to lift and place pipeline elements in a trench)
- dragline (used to backfill a trench)
- rammer (used to compact the soil in an excavation).

== Standards ==
Construction, installation, operation, inspection, testing, and maintenance of sidebooms are covered by OSHA standard 1926.1440 - Sideboom cranes and ASME B30.14 - Side Boom Tractors.
