= Yadgir railway station =

Railway station in Yadgir, India

General information
- Location: Railway Station Rd, Yadgir, Yadgir district, Karnataka. India
- Coordinates: 16°44′32″N 77°07′45″E
- Elevation: 633 m (2,077 ft)
- System: Indian Railways station
- Line: Guntakal–Wadi
- Platforms: 3
- Tracks: 5 ft 6 in (1,676 mm) broad gauge

Construction
- Structure type: Standard (on-ground station)
- Parking: Available

Other information
- Status: Functioning
- Station code: YG
- Zone(s): South Central Railway,
- Division(s): Secunderabad

History
- Opened: 1871
Location
- Location within Karnataka Location within India

Yadgir railway station, (station code: YG) is an Indian Railways train station located in Yadgir in the Indian state of Karnataka and serves Yadagiri area. It is located on the Guntakal–Wadi(Excl) line of in South Central Railway zone.

== History ==
Yadgir was on the two great railway systems of yesteryears – the Great Indian Peninsula Railway and Madras Railway. While the former started construction from Mumbai, the latter from Chennai. The two systems met at Raichur in 1871.

== Structure and expansion ==
Yadgir railway station has three platforms, each running to 650 meters in length, computerized reservation counter, waiting room, tea stall, parking, foot overbridge, and toilet facilities. Yadgir has connectivity with Bengaluru, Pune, Hyderabad, Latur, Aurangabad and Mumbai, Delhi.

Preceding station	Indian Railways	Following station
Lingiri (LGRE) towards ?	South Central Railway zone Guntakal–Wadi	Thangundi (TGDE) towards ?
