= Reservation against Cancellation =

Ticket status in Indian Railways reservation system

Reservation Against Cancellation (RAC) is a ticket status in the reservation system of the Indian Railways. It guarantees that a passenger can board and travel on a train but does not ensure allocation of a full berth at the time of booking.

RAC is positioned between confirmed tickets and waiting list tickets. Unlike waitlisted passengers, RAC ticket holders are permitted to travel in reserved coaches.

== Berth allocation ==
In most non-AC and AC sleeper classes, RAC passengers are typically allotted seating accommodation, often involving a shared side lower berth between two passengers. During daytime, both passengers are seated, and at night, the berth is shared until one passenger is upgraded to a full berth.

However, berth allocation is managed dynamically through computerized reservation systems, and the exact seating arrangement may vary depending on coach configuration, class, and availability.

== Confirmation process ==
RAC ticket holders may be allotted a full berth under the following conditions:

- Cancellation of confirmed tickets prior to departure
- Release of unused quota berths (e.g., General, Tatkal, or emergency quotas)
- Berth allocation during reservation chart preparation

Indian Railways typically prepares reservation charts in two stages:

- First chart: prepared several hours (often 8–10 hours) before departure
- Final chart: prepared closer to departure time

Final berth allocation for RAC passengers is determined during these chart preparations.

== Chart vacancy and availability ==
Chart vacancy refers to the number of vacant berths available after chart preparation. These vacancies may arise due to cancellations, no-shows, or quota releases. RAC passengers are prioritized for berth allocation from these vacancies before waitlisted passengers.

Vacant berths after chart preparation can be checked through official enquiry systems or third-party aggregation platforms that compile chart vacancy data across trains and stations.

== Status notation ==
RAC and waiting list tickets are typically displayed with two numbers, for example:

- RAC8/RAC2
- WL20/WL15
- WL12/RAC2

The first number indicates the status at the time of booking, while the second number indicates the current status after subsequent changes due to cancellations or updates.

For example, RAC8/RAC2 means the ticket was initially RAC 8 and has progressed to RAC 2.

Passengers can check real-time ticket status using the official PNR enquiry system.

== Recent developments ==
- Reservation systems are increasingly automated, with dynamic berth allocation based on real-time data.
- Earlier preparation of reservation charts has improved transparency for passengers regarding final ticket status.
- Boarding point changes are permitted until chart preparation for confirmed and RAC tickets.
- Certain premium or special train services may not offer RAC quotas and allow only confirmed bookings.

== See also ==
- Indian Railways
- Tatkal scheme
- Berth (sleeping)
