= Namo Bharat (trainset) =

Indian electric multiple unit train used for regional rapid train services

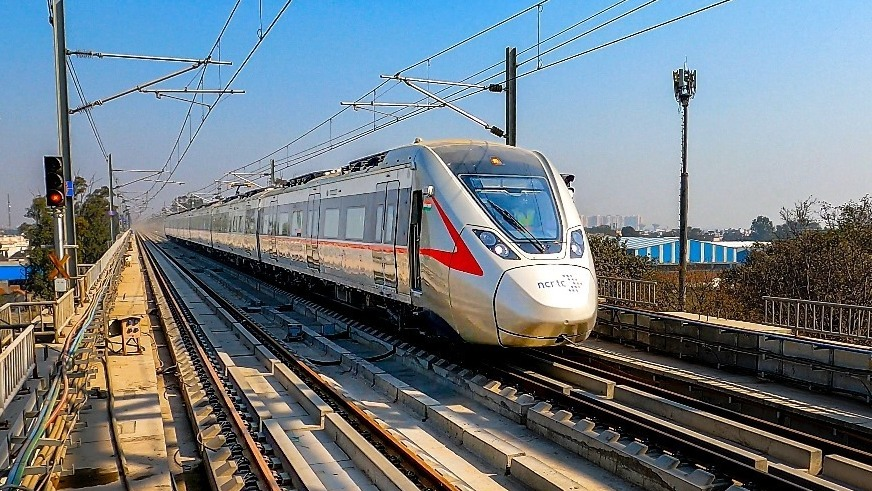
- Namo Bharat Train in Meerut

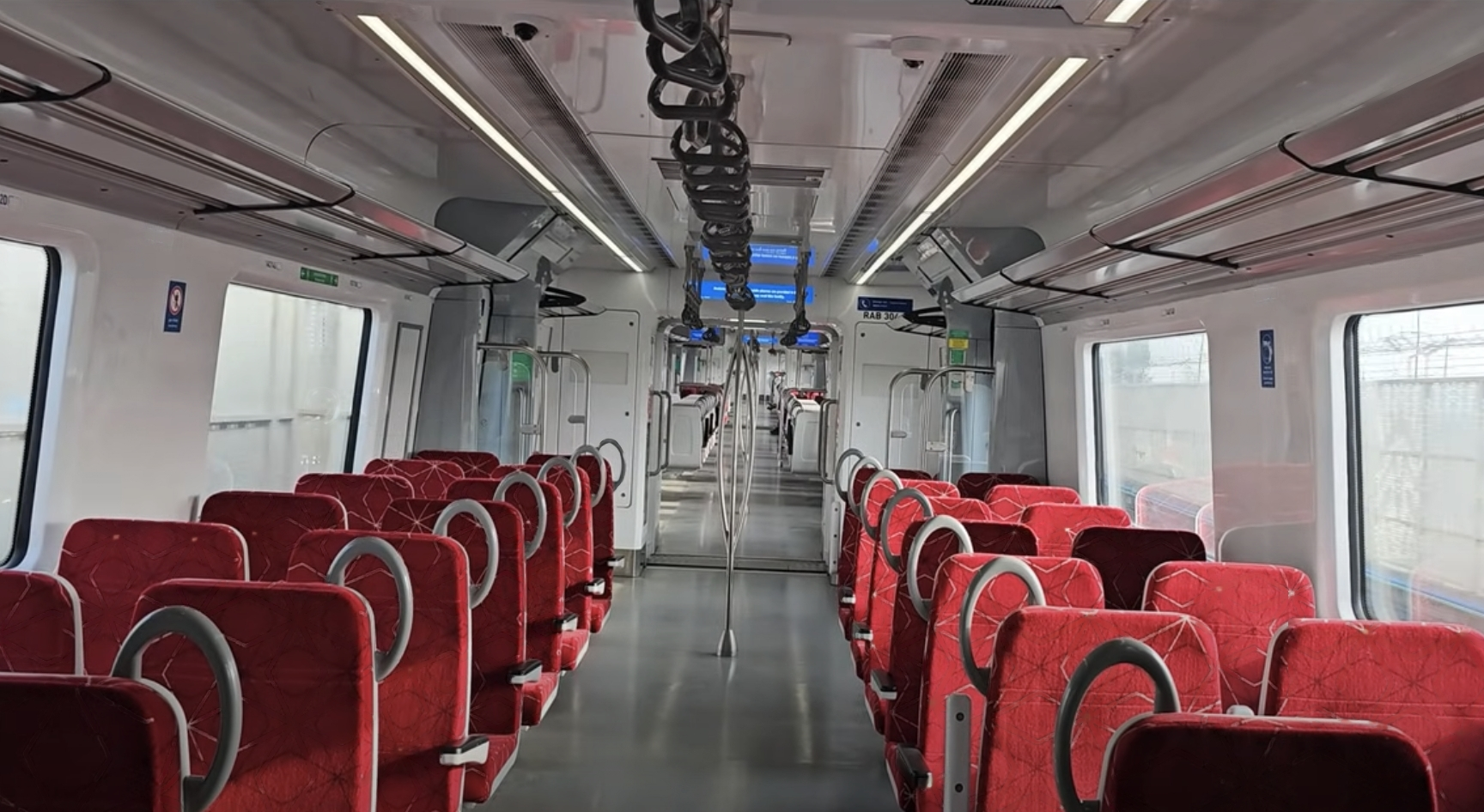
- Interior of the trainset.
- Stock type: EMU
- In service: 2023–present
- Manufacturer: Alstom Transport India Limited
- Designer: Alstom in Hyderabad
- Assembly: Alstom in Savli
- Built at: Alstom Savli plant (formerly Bombardier Transportation)
- Constructed: 8 May 2022
- Entered service: 20 October 2023
- Number built: 210
- Number in service: 102
- Formation: 3, 6 and 9 cars per trainset
- Capacity: 407 (seating); 1,061(standing)
- Owner: NCRTC
- Operator: DB RRTS Operations India Pvt. Ltd.
- Depot: 1
- Line served: 1

Specifications
- Car body construction: stainless steel body
- Car length: 22 m
- Width: 3.20 m
- Doors: Automatic
- Maximum speed: Design: 180 km/h (110 mph); Service: 160 km/h (100 mph)
- Acceleration: 0.7 m/s^{2} (2.3 ft/s^{2})
- Power supply: 25 kV 50 Hz AC
- HVAC: yes
- Electric system: 25000 V AC
- Current collection: Pantograph
- Safety system: ETCS Level 2 with ATO subsystem supported by Nokia 4.9G/LTE private wireless network
- Headlight type: Light Emitting Diode
- Seating: 2x2
- Track gauge: 1,435 mm (4 ft 8 1/2 in) standard gauge

The Namo Bharat is an Indian electric train built for Namo Bharat Regional Rapid Transit services. The train was designed by the French rolling stock manufacturer Alstom at its engineering centre in Hyderabad, Telangana, and was manufactured in Savli, Gujarat. The train has an aerodynamic design which reduces the drag when it travels. The train has a design speed of 180 km/h (110 mph) and is operated at a speed of 160 km/h (99 mph).

The trainsets are running and operational on Delhi Meerut RRTS system since 2023.

== History ==
As the RapidX service was conceived, there was a need for a new semi-high-speed trainset, specifically built for the purpose of semi-high-speed regional rail travel. In accordance with the Make in India initiative, the train sets were set to be locally built after the National Capital Region Transport Corporation (NCRTC) opened the tenders for the same in 2019. In early 2020, NCRTC finalised the procurement of train set, which were set to be manufactured by Bombardier Transportation in Savli. The tender was finalised for the train to have 50% of the local components as opposed to the original requirement of 75% in line with the Make in India initiative. Later in the year, the train's design was unveiled to the public. The stainless steel body of the train was designed to have a maximum speed of 180 km/h.

On 19 October 2023, the trainset was named Namo Bharat.

On 20 October 2023, the trainset was officially inaugurated by Prime Minister Narendra Modi and entered service.

On 21 October 2023, the trainset made its commercial debut in the Duhai - Sahibabad section.

== Engineering ==
=== Exterior ===
The train is designed to have a stainless steel body with an aerodynamic nose cone to reduce the air drag resistance produced while travelling at higher speeds. The train is relatively lighter in weight thanks to its stainless steel body. For easier entry and exit, each car is equipped with six doors, three on each side, excluding the Business class which has four doors, two on each side. Each car has double glazed, tempered safety glass windows.

=== Interior ===
The train has a 2x2 seating arrangement with adequate legroom for the passengers. The aisles have grab handles and poles for standing passengers during the peak hours. Since it is built for regional rail service, it has an overhead luggage rack. When it comes to digital features the train has on-board Wi-Fi, a public announcement and display system, an infotainment display, a dynamic route map display and emergency communication facilities. For efficient consumption of energy, the trainsets include ambient lighting and temperature control systems. The train is also accessible with a dedicated wheelchair space. When it comes to safety, the train is equipped with a fire & smoke detector, CCTV, fire extinguisher and door status indicator along with innovative Train Control Monitoring System technology, and its predictive and condition-based monitoring features.

=== Technology ===
The trainset is equipped with a new signalling technology called "ETCS L3 hybrid technology over LTE" which helps contribute to safety, facilitating interoperability, reducing wait time and enabling efficiency. There are plans to equip the trainset with Automatic Train Operation (ATO) over Long Term Evolution (LTE) in the future to further increase network performance and capacity.

== In service ==
The Namo Bharat trainset was brought into service when the Delhi Meerut RRTS (RapidX) line was inaugurated on 20 October 2023. The trainset is expected to be used in other proposed RapidX routes as well. Prime Minister Narendra Modi inaugurated the 13 kilometre long Delhi section of the Namo Bharat corridor between Ashok Nagar and Sahibabad on 5 January 2025. This connects Delhi to Meerut and reduces the travel time to 40 minutes.

== Corridors ==
| Name of corridor | Length (km) | State of the project |
|---|---|---|
| Delhi–Meerut RRTS | 82.15 | operational |
| Delhi–Alwar RRTS | 199 | pre-construction |
| Delhi–Panipat RRTS | 103 | pre-construction |
| Ghaziabad–Jewar RRTS (Uttar Pradesh) | 72.4 | planned |
| Kanpur–Lucknow–Ayodhya RRTS (Uttar Pradesh) | TBA | planned |
| Thiruvananthapuram–Kasaragod RRTS (Kerala) | 583 | planned |
| Chennai–Villupuram RRTS (Tamil Nadu) | TBA | planned |
| Bengaluru–Mysuru RRTS (Karnataka) | 145 | planned |
| Bengaluru–Chikkaballapura RRTS (Karnataka) | 64 | planned |
| Bengaluru–Tumakuru RRTS (Karnataka) | 60 | planned |
| Bengaluru–Kolar RRTS (Karnataka) | 65 | planned |
| Bengaluru–Kanakapura RRTS (Karnataka) | 60 | planned |
| Kolkata–Kalyani–Krishnanagar–Mayapur RRTS (West Bengal) | 135 | planned |
| Kolkata–Bardhaman–Durgapur–Asansol RRTS (West Bengal) | 232 | planned |
| Kolkata–Falta–Diamond Harbour–Haldia RRTS (West Bengal) | 102 | planned |
| Kolkata–Santragachi–Kolaghat–Medinipur RRTS (West Bengal) | 135 | planned |
| Patna–Gaya RRTS (Bihar) | 108 | planned |
| Patna–Begusarai RRTS (Bihar) | 130 | planned |
| Patna–Muzaffarpur RRTS (Bihar) | 67 | planned |
| Patna–Ara RRTS (Bihar) | 46 | planned |

== See also ==
- B28 trainset – Upcoming Indian high speed train type
- Vande Bharat (trainset)
- Amrit Bharat (trainset)
- Vande Bharat (sleeper trainset)
