= Vande Bharat Sleeper (trainset) =

Semi high-speed EMU sleeper trainset of India

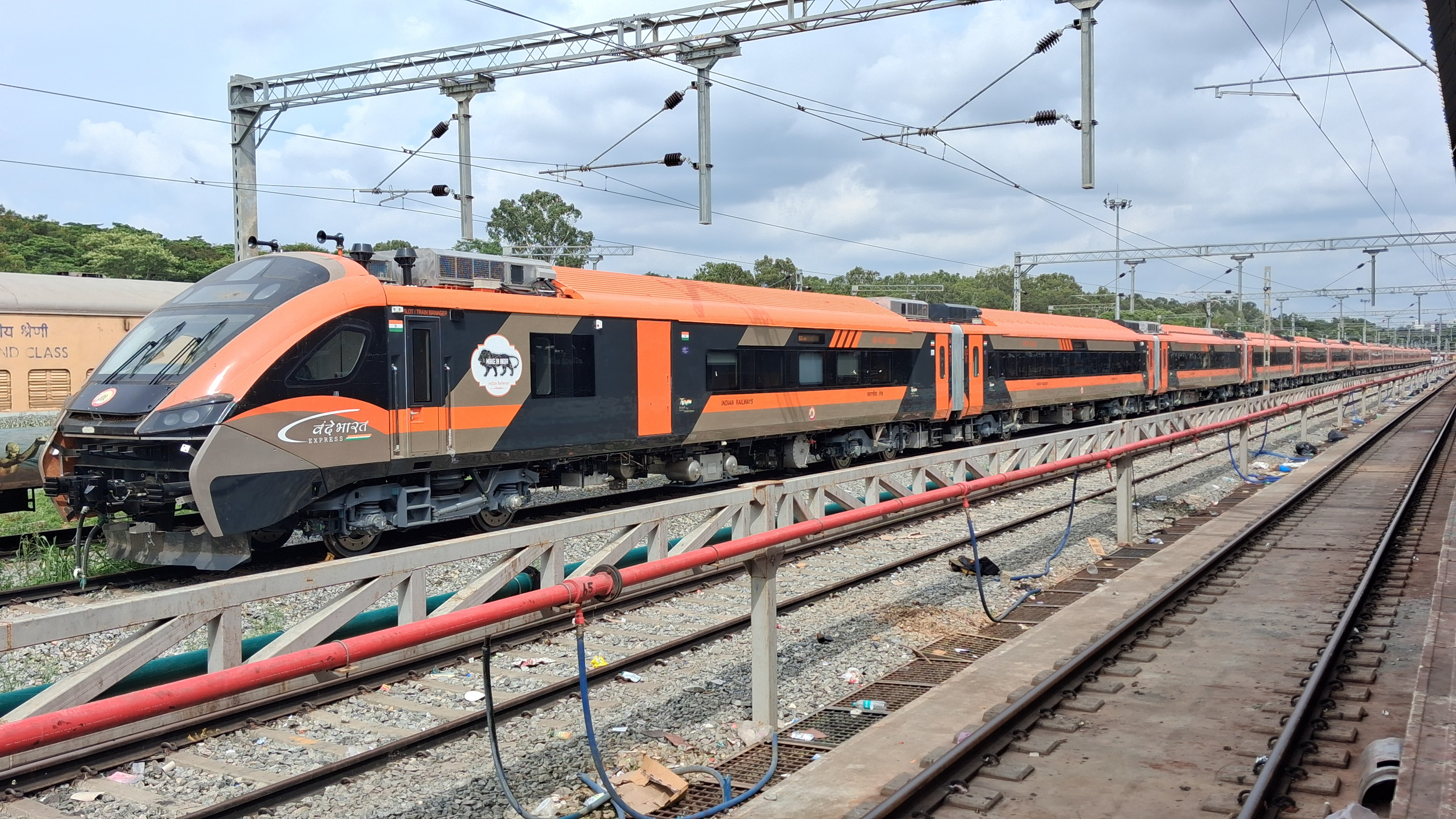
- Vande Bharat Sleeper Express at SMVT Bengaluru
- Stock type: Electric Multiple Unit
- Manufacturer: BEML
- Designer: Integral Coach Factory
- Number built: 9
- Operator: Indian Railways

Specifications
- Car body construction: Austenitic stainless steel and polycarbonate
- Doors: Automatic
- Maximum speed: 180 km/h (110 mph)
- Electric system: 25 kV 50 Hz AC overhead line
- Current collection: Pantograph
- Braking system: Air brake with regenerative braking
- Safety system: Kavach
- Track gauge: 5 ft 6 in (1,676 mm) Broad gauge

The Vande Bharat Sleeper trainset, formerly known as Train 20, is a semi-high-speed, long-distance electric multiple unit developed for the Vande Bharat Sleeper services of the Indian Railways. It was developed by the Integral Coach Factory based on the Vande Bharat trainset, with modifications to the exterior, added sleeping berths, and other amenities to cater to long-distance service. Each trainset has sixteen cars, and is capable of accommodating up to 823 passengers in three classes. The first prototype was launched in September 2024 and commercial operations began in January 2026.

== Background and planning ==
The express trains operated by the Indian Railways are often limited to a maximum speed of 100–110 km/h (62–68 mph), with the average speeds of about 54 km/h (34 mph). The major limitations included the lack of infrastructure such as tracks and trainsets that are capable of supporting higher speeds. In the 2010s, the Indian Railways began to develop new trainsets in a bid to improve speed. In 2018, the Integral Coach Factory (ICF) in Chennai developed Electric Multiple Unit based Vande Bharat trainsets (earlier known as Train 18), composed of chair car coaches, which were intended for operating short-distance services. In 2018, the Indian Railways planned a sleeper version of Vande Bharat trainset for long-distance operations. The coaches were planned to be made of lightweight aluminium, for better efficiency, and aesthetics. The first prototype was expected to be out by 2020, and it was named "Train 20".

== Manufacturing ==
In early 2018, The Indian Railways invited bids for the manufacture of 291 coaches for 15 trainsets. As per the bid conditions, the first trainset consisting of 20 coaches will be transferred to ICF, which will be developed as a prototype. The other trainsets will be assembled at ICF, based on the components supplied by the successful bidder. In the bidding process, Stadler-Medha consortium emerged as the sole bidder. In July 2018, the Nallasopara-Virar train shed of the Western Railways was identified as a potential site for housing the trainsets. In August 2018, the Department for Promotion of Industry and Internal Trade of the Government of India red-flagged the initial tender, stating that it was not in line with the 'Make in India' project.

In April 2022, a new tender was floated for the manufacture 200 sleeper trainsets with stainless steel coaches. In March 2023, the contract for the production of the 120 trainsets was awarded to Kinet Railway Systems, a consortium of Rail Vikas Nigam and Transmashholding, which emerged as the lowest bidder with ₹1.2 billion (US$12 million) per trainset. As per the bid, the consortium would manufacture the trainsets in the Indian Railways facility at Latur and would maintain the sets for 35 years. A month later, the consortium of Bharat Heavy Electricals Limited-Titagarh Rail Systems (TRSL), who was the second lowest bidder, was awarded the contract for the manufacture of the remaining 80 trainsets at the same price as the lowest bid, with the commercial production of these trainsets set to begin in June 2025 at the TRSL plant in West Bengal. In May 2023, Alstom was awarded a contract for the manufacturing and maintenance of 100 aluminium body trainsets, at a cost of ₹1.509 billion (US$16 million) per trainset. However, the Alstom contract was later cancelled after Indian Railways sought to reduce the per unit cost of the trainset to ₹1.4 billion (US$15 million).

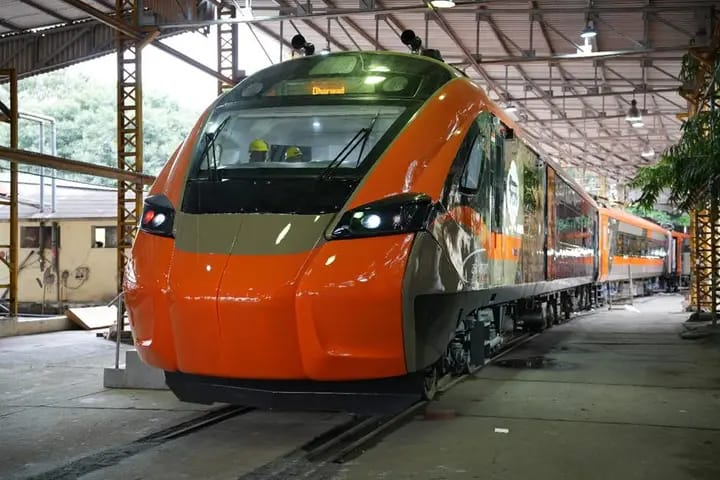
Vande Bharat Sleeper prototype at BEML

In 2023, ICF–BEML were designated to manufacture the first ten Vande Bharat sleeper trainsets. The propulsion was to be supplied by the ICF, with the assembly of the train carried out at the BEML facility in Bengaluru. In September 2024, the first prototype of the Vande Bharat sleeper trainset, was rolled out, with commercial services planned to start in 2025. In December 2025, the prototype reached speeds of 180 km/h (110 mph) during the trial runs conducted under the supervision of the Commission of Railway Safety. On 17 January 2026, the first Vande Bharat Sleeper Express was inaugurated by prime minister Narendra Modi. The third and fourth sets are planned to be rolled out by March 2026, with a planned delivery rate of one rake per month for the final six units, to be completed by August 2026.

According to the ICF, it is also involved in the process of designing a trainset consisting of 24 coaches including a pantry car, the production of which would be taken up after the delivery of the initial order of ten trainsets. As of July 2026, nine rakes have been manufactured.

== Design and engineering ==
The Vande Bharat sleeper trainset can operate at speeds up to 160 km/h (99 mph), and has an aerodynamic design which helps in countering drag at higher speeds. It is equipped with driver cabins at both ends for quick turnaround of the train at terminal stations. Alternate coaches will have motor propulsion systems that enable acceleration and deceleration rates of 0.7–0.8 m/s^{2} (2.3–2.6 ft/s^{2}). A standard Vande Bharat sleeper trainset consists of 16 coaches in a three class configuration. It has eleven AC three-tier coaches, four AC two-tier coaches, and one AC first-class coach, with a capacity to accommodate 611, 188, and 24 passengers respectively. The trainset, with a total carrying capacity of 887, with 823 reserved for the passengers including a few with disabled friendly features, and 34 designated for the onboard staff.

The coaches are fully air-conditioned and equipped with automatic doors, better coupling to reduce jerks, and improved soundproofing. The trainset features bunk beds with berths designed to be broader, and better cushioned relative to the existing services of the Indian Railways. They are equipped with reading lights and electric sockets. There are six pantry areas to cater to onboard catering. The beds will be designed to be broader, comfortable and better cushioned relative to the existing services. The bio toilets are equipped with odour control systems, automatic taps, and anti-spill features. A hot shower facility will be exclusively available for passengers in the first AC class. The trainset also has sensor based lights, public announcement systems, and visual information systems.

=== Rake formation ===
Each standard 16-car rake consists of four basic units of four coaches each. Each basic unit is composed of two Motor Coaches (MC/MC2) and Trailer Coaches (TC) or Non-Driving Trailer Coaches (NDTC). The trailer coaches at both ends are designated as Driving Trailer Coach (DTC), which accommodates the driver cabin.

Rake formation of 16 coach Vande Bharat sleeper trainset
| Position | 1 | 2 | 3 | 4 | 5 | 6 | 7 | 8 | 9 | 10 | 11 | 12 | 13 | 14 | 15 | 16 |
| Power Unit | Unit 1 | | | | Unit 2 | | | | Unit 3 | | | | Unit 4 | | | |
| Configuration | DTC | MC | TC | MC2 | MC | TC | MC2 | NDTC | NDTC | MC2 | TC | MC | MC2 | TC | MC | DTC |
| Class | 3AC | | | | 2AC | 3AC | 2AC | 1AC | 2AC | | 3AC | | | | | |
| Coach No. | B1 | B2 | B3 | B4 | A1 | B5 | A2 | H1 | A3 | A4 | B6 | B7 | B8 | B9 | B10 | B11 |
| Capacity | 28 | 67 | 55 | 67 | 48 | 55 | 48 | 24 | 44 | 48 | 55 | 67 | 67 | 55 | 67 | 28 |

== See also ==
- Amrit Bharat (trainset) – Indian push-pull trainsets
- Namo Bharat (trainset) – Indian electric multiple unit train used for regional rapid train services
- B28 trainset – Upcoming Indian high speed train type
