= Motor coach (rail) =

Self-propelled passenger train coach

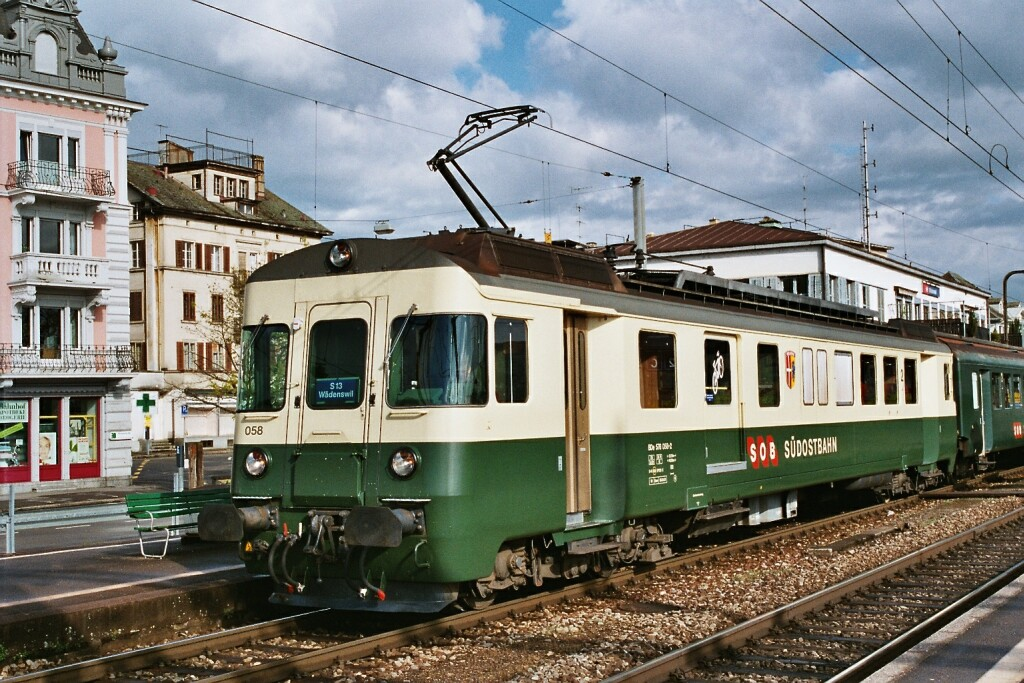
A 2100 kW motor coach of SOB at the head of a train in Wädenswil 2003

A motor coach (international usage) or motorcar (US usage) is a self-propelled passenger rail vehicle also capable of hauling a train. With multiple unit train control, one operator can control several "motor coaches", possibly even combined with locomotives, efficiently in the same train, making longer trains possible.

Motor coaches can replace locomotives at the head of local passenger or freight trains. Especially electrified narrow gauge lines on the European continent often saw this form of operation. Many of these railways closed down, and many others changed to electric multiple units. However, a few lines in Switzerland, Italy and Austria still work with train consists hauled by motor coaches. It can be expected that the Bernina line of Rhaetian Railway will continue for a long time to be operated with motor coaches pulling passenger and freight trains.

== Examples of motor coaches ==
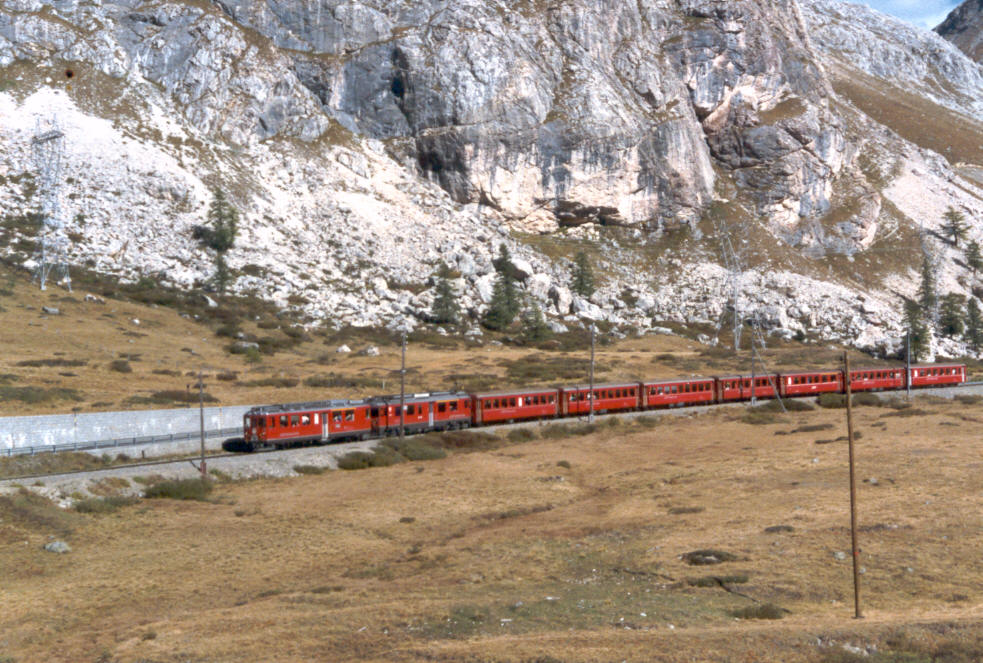
Two motor coaches of RhB in MU pulling the maximum allowed load of 140 t on the Bernina line

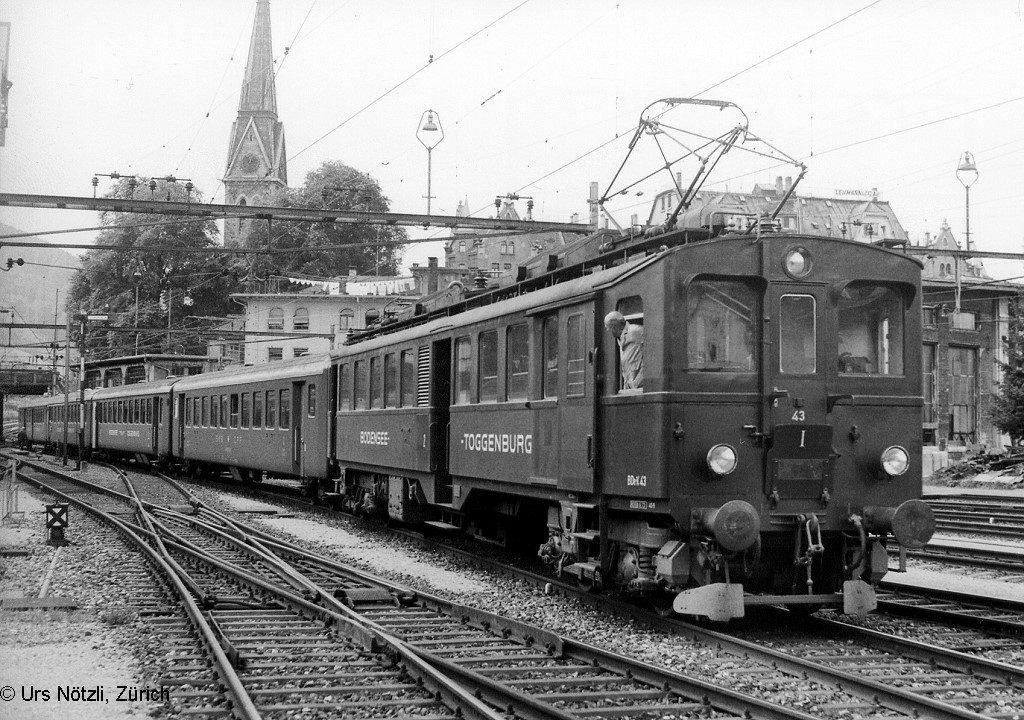
An old Bodensee-Toggenburg (Switzerland) motor coach pulling four coaches: not an EMU and not a railcar

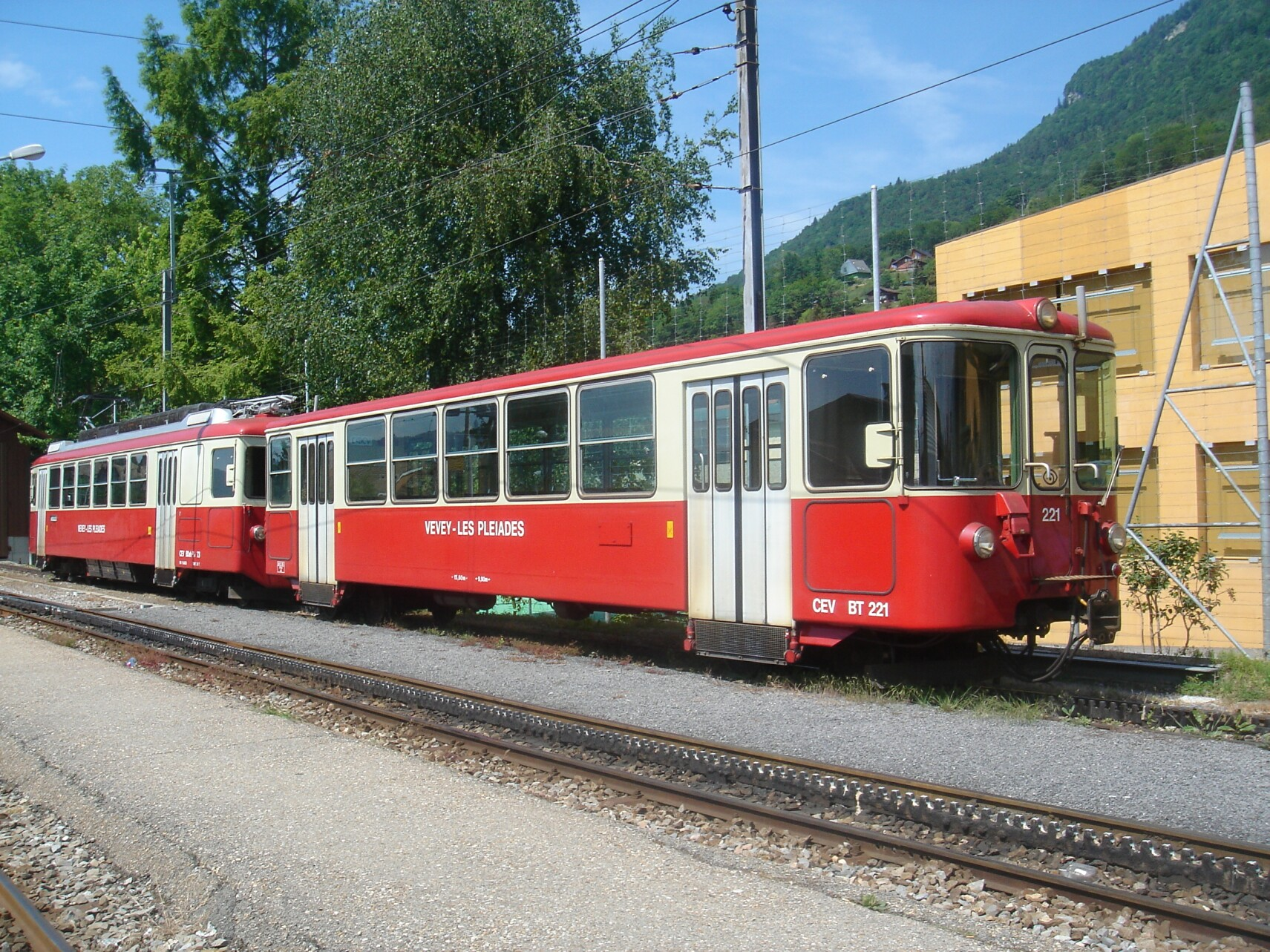
Electric motor coach of CEV (Switzerland) with driving trailer

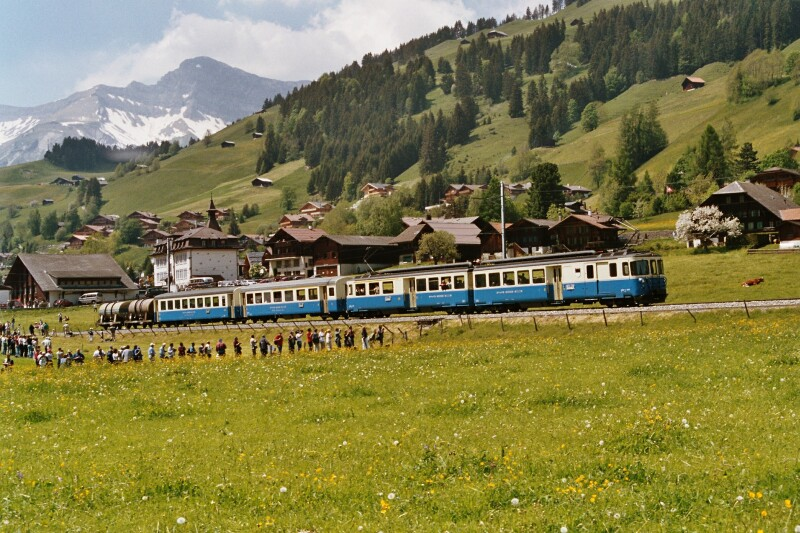
Metre-gauge electric twin motor coach ABDe 8/8 4004 of the Montreux–Lenk im Simmental line in Switzerland pulling two coaches and two cement wagons

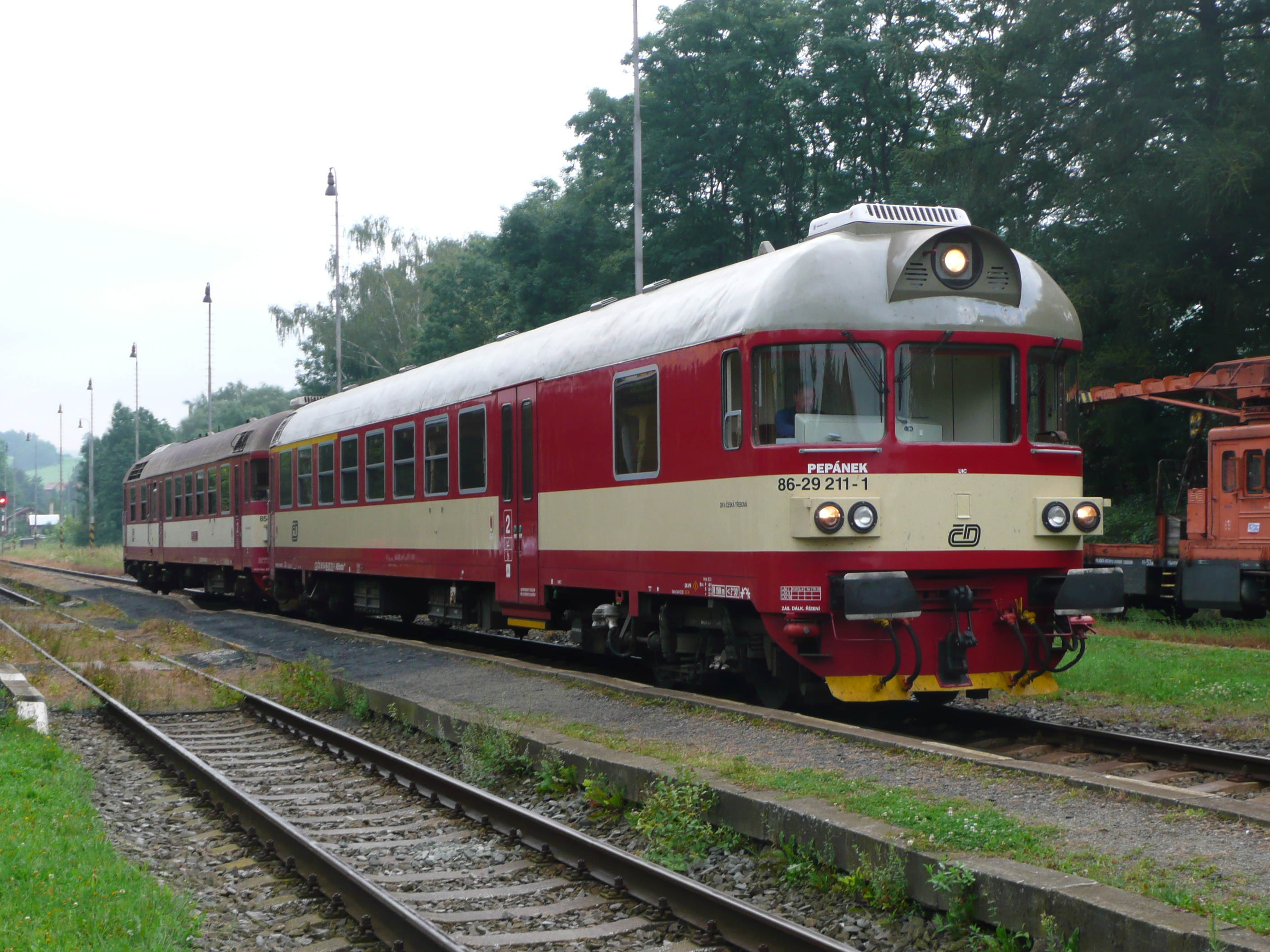
A Czech diesel motor coach with a driving trailer

== See also ==
- Autorail
- Budd Rail Diesel Car
- Budd SPV-2000
- British Rail Class 108
- ČD Class 810
- ČD Class 814
- ČD Class 840 and 841
- New York City Subway rolling stock
- Power car
- Railbus
- Railcar
- Railmotor
- Uerdingen railbus

=== Categories ===
- Railcar
- Railbus
- Multiple unit
  - Diesel multiple unit
  - Electric multiple unit
- Locomotive

=== General ===
- British Rail railbuses

== Literature ==
- Ellis, Ian (2006). Ellis' British Railway Engineering Encyclopaedia. Lulu. ISBN 978-1-84728-643-7.
- Jackson, Alan A. (2006). The Railway Dictionary (4th ed.). Stroud: Sutton Publishing. ISBN 0-7509-4218-5.
