= Tatkal scheme =

Ticketing program established by Indian Railways

The Tatkal Quota (TQ) Booking (transl. Spot Quota Booking) is a ticketing programme established by Indian Railways. The scheme is used for booking journeys at very short notice. The Indian Railways introduced it in all forms of reserved classes on almost all trains in India. It was introduced in 1997, when Mr. Nitish Kumar was the Union Minister of Railways in India. Bookings can be made online and offline.

== Features ==
Tatkal tickets can be booked over the counter in a railway station and on the internet at IRCTCL.

- AC Tatkal ticket booking opens at 10:00 AM one day before the train departs from its origin station. The day of the journey is defined as the day of chart preparation. For APP based booking TATKAL window opens 1 day in advance excluding the day of journey. If travel date is on 5th TATKAL will open in APP on 4th; on the other side, if date of journey at boarding station is 5th for the train starting at the origin station on 4th, then tatkal booking will open on 3rd.
- Booking starts at 10:00 AM for Air-Conditioned coaches. For Non Air-Conditioned reserved coaches it starts from 11:00 AM.
- No entire trains are defined as Tatkal trains. Unsold Tatkal tickets are released to passengers on a waiting list. Confirmed Tatkal tickets can be cancelled, but no refunds are given. Tatkal tickets on the waiting list may be cancelled and refunded.
- On those trains and in those cases where the average utilization of Tatkal accommodation during the peak period of April to September is 80% and above, the Tatkal charges that are applicable during the peak period will be charged throughout the year, i.e., for both the peak and the non-peak periods.
- Indian Railways is revamping the Tatkal booking system as part of broader ticketing reforms. Chart preparation will now occur eight hours before train departure, improving clarity for waitlisted passengers. Aadhaar authentication will be mandatory for Tatkal bookings to enhance security and reduce misuse. A Modern Passenger Reservation System (PRS), developed by CRIS, is also set to launch by December-2025 to streamline and upgrade the booking experience.

== Premium Tatkal (PT) Quota Booking ==
Premium Tatkal (PT) Quota Booking (transl. Premium Spot Quota Booking) was introduced on 01-October-2014 covering half of the tickets on certain trains. These tickets can be purchased online only. The programme began with a pilot of about 80 trains. Premium Tatkal and regular Tatkal tickets operate in the same manner but premium tatkal will cost more than twice of tatkal ticket

== Fraud Prevention ==
Misuse of this scheme led the Ministry of Railways to change the timing of Tatkal booking in June-2015. All types of ticketing agents including IRCTCL agents will now be debarred from booking Non-Tatkal tickets for 30 minutes from the opening of bookings, that is from 08:00 AM to 08:30 AM for general classes, from 10:00 AM onwards for Tatkal AC classes, and from 11:00 AM onwards for Tatkal Non-AC classes. The system is prone to exploitation.

== See also ==
- Indian Railways
- IRCTCL
