= BEML =

Indian heavy equipment manufacturer

Coordinates: 12.971403°N 77.659518°E

BEML Limited
- Type: Public
- Traded as: NSE: BEML; BSE: 500048
- Industry: Heavy equipment Defence; Railway vehicles
- Founded: May 1964
- Headquarters: BEML Soudha, No 23/1, IV Main, Sampangiramanagar, Bangalore, Karnataka, India
- Area served: Worldwide
- Key people: Shantanu Roy (Chairman & MD)
- Products: Earthmoving equipment Underground mining equipment Railway equipment High power diesel engines Heavy duty hydraulic aggregates
- Revenue: ▼₹4,096 crore (US$440 million) (2024)
- Operating income: ▲₹153.20 crore (US$16 million) (2020)
- Net income: ▲₹68.38 crore (US$7.3 million) (2020)
- Total assets: ▲₹5,066.71 crore (US$540 million) (2020)
- Total equity: ▲₹2,257.15 crore (US$240 million) (2020)
- Owner: Government of India (54.03%)
- Number of employees: 6,973 (FY 2024-25)
- Subsidiaries: MAMC Industries; BEML Skybus
- Website: www.bemlindia.in

BEML Limited, formerly Bharat Earth Movers Limited, is an Indian public sector undertaking which manufactures a variety of heavy equipment, such as that used for earth moving, railways, transport, and mining. It is headquartered in Bengaluru, Karnataka. BEML is Asia's second-largest manufacturer of earth moving equipment. Its stock trades on the National Stock Exchange of India under the symbol "BEML", and on the Bombay Stock Exchange under the code "500048".

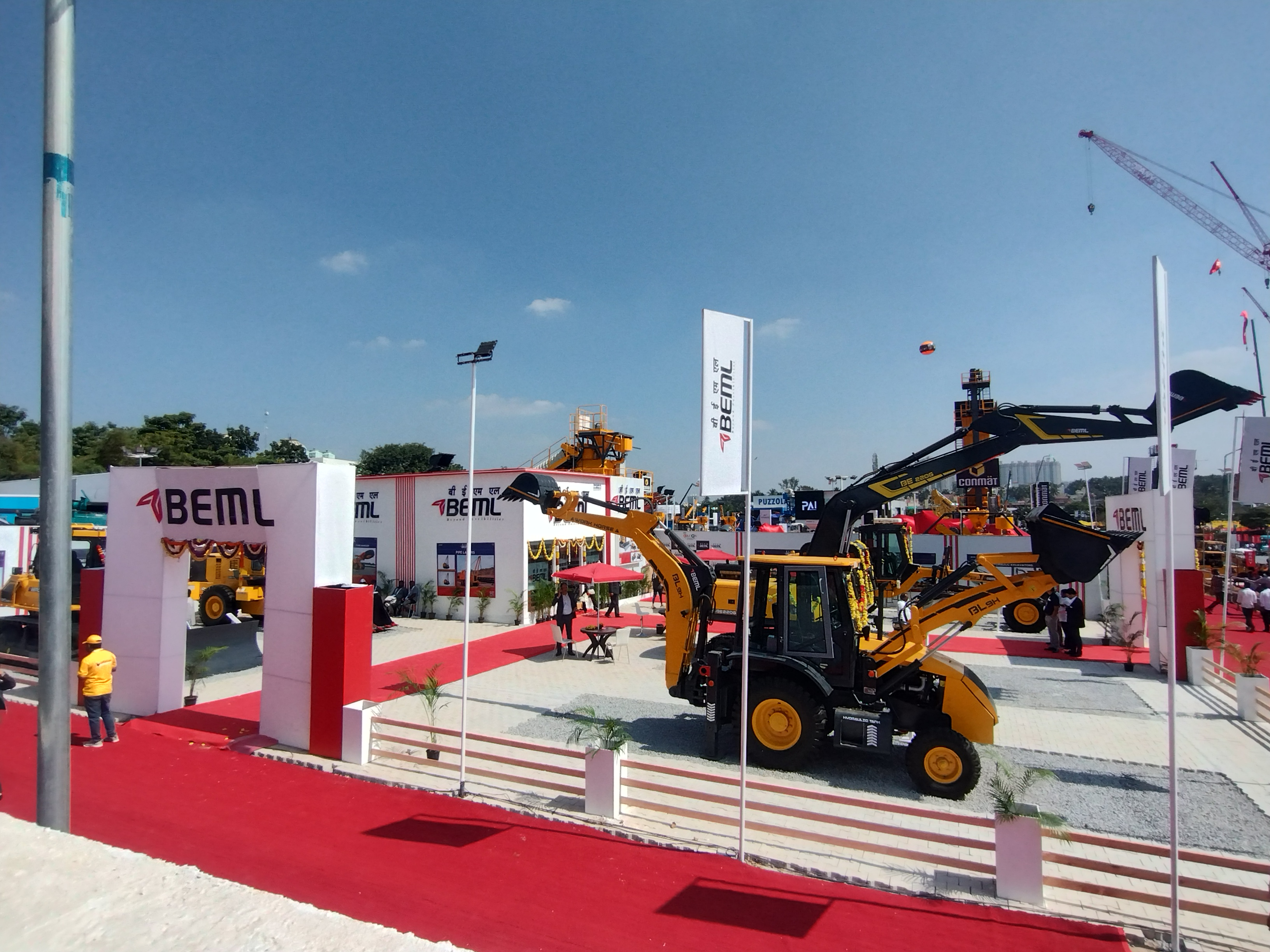
BEML at EXCON 2025, BIEC

== History ==
Bharat Earth Movers Limited was incorporated on 11 May 1964 with the help of the Soviet Union. BEML was wholly owned by the government and operated by India's Ministry of Defence until 1992, when the government divested 25% of its holdings in the company. The company went for a Follow-on Public offer (FPO) in July 2007 and fixed the price band for its FPO between ₹1,020 and ₹1,090. On 5 October, the company changed its name to BEML Ltd. In December 2019, the Government of India had given 'in-principle' approval for strategic disinvestment of BEML Ltd to the extent of 26% out of the Government shareholding of 54.03%, with transfer of management control to a strategic buyer.

== Manufacturing facilities ==
BEML has manufacturing plants in Kolar Gold Fields, Bangalore, Mysore and Palakkad. It has numerous regional offices throughout the country. KGF unit is the main unit accounting for the manufacture and assembly of a wide array of earth-moving equipment, such as bulldozers and excavators. Railcoaches are made in the Bengaluru complex, and the Mysore facility makes dump trucks and engines of various capacities. On 10 August 2020, Defence Minister Rajnath Singh inaugurated the industrial design centre (IDC) at BEML Bengaluru, aiming to integrate research and development with manufacturing.

== Residency ==
BEML Layout, located in Brookefield, Bengaluru, was originally developed as a residential colony for its employees. The neighbourhood subsequently evolved into a residential locality with a wider population beyond the company's workforce. A residents' association, BEML Employees Society Township Club, was established to support the welfare and community activities of employees and their families residing in the layout.

== Products ==
BEML manufactures a wide range of products to meet the requirements of the mining, construction, power, irrigation, fertiliser, cement, steel, and rail sectors. Its earthmoving and mining equipment includes bulldozers, dump trucks, hydraulic excavators, wheel loaders, electric rope shovels, walking draglines, motor graders, and scrapers.

BEML has expanded into underground mining equipment, including side discharge loaders and load-haul-dump machines. Its railway products include integral rail coaches, electric multiple units (EMUs), rail buses, track-laying equipment, spoil disposal units and overhead equipment (OHE) inspection cars. The company also manufactures heavy-duty TATRA trucks, transportation trailers and hydraulic aggregates for industrial applications.

BEML also manufactures high-power diesel engines and heavy-duty hydraulic aggregates. Its Engine Division, established in Mysuru in 1991 with technical collaboration from Komatsu, Japan, produces engines for mining, construction, earthmoving and defence equipment. Its Hydraulics & Powerline Division manufactures hydraulic aggregates, transmissions, axles and other components for industrial and defence applications.

== Mining and construction equipment ==
BEML is one of India's major manufacturers of mining and construction equipment. The company offers a diverse range of mining machinery for both opencast and underground mining operations.

BEML manufactures machines such as hydraulic excavators, bulldozers, wheel loaders, wheel dozers, dump trucks, motor graders, pipe layers, tyre handlers, water sprinklers, backhoe loaders, electric rope shovels, walking draglines and load-haul-dump (LHD) machines.

In 2025, BEML unveils a large electric rope shovel named BRS21, which is wholly designed and manufactured in India. It weighs 720 tonnes and has a 21 cubic meter bottom dump bucket.

In the same year, BEML floated an EoI (Expression of Interest) for design consultancy in developing indigenous Tunnel Boring Machines. Reportedly, initial discussions have already been initiated by the company with firms from Austria and Japan.

== Defense and aerospace ==
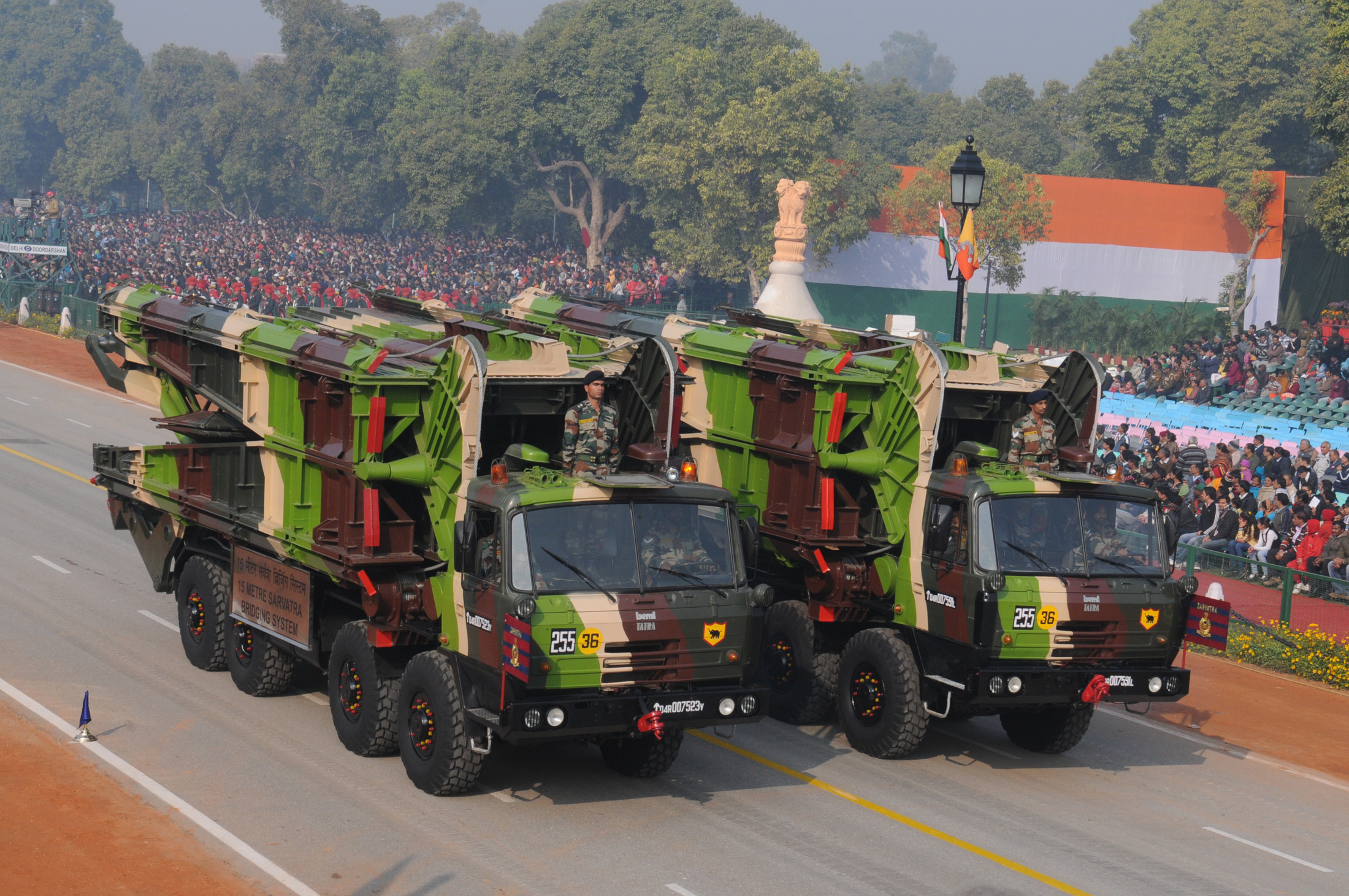
DRDO Sarvatra Bridge System produced by BEML

BEML plays a role in the country's Integrated Guided Missile Development Programme by supplying ground support vehicles. The company launched its Aerospace Manufacturing Division during Aero India 2009. The division manufactures ground support equipment, including aircraft towing tractors, aircraft weapon loading trolleys, multi-purpose weapon loaders and crash fire tenders.

=== DATRAN 1500 ===
As reported in 2010, an indigenous engine, capable of providing a power output of 1,500 hp (1,100 kW) was to be developed for DRDO's Future Main Battle Tank (FMBT) programme. A national team had been formed, including members from academia, the user, industry, and the DRDO. The prototype would be ready by 4-5 yrs. Another project to develop the automatic transmission system for the tank was being launched. The indigenous engine, along with the transmission, will collectively form the Bharat Power Pack which will meet the FMBT's mobility requirements.

As of 2012, DRDO had launched a “mission mode” project to develop the engine. The development project includes companies like Kirloskar Oil Engines, BEML, and the Mahindra & Mahindra; research institutions like Indian Institutes of Technology (IITs); and bodies like the Automotive Research Association of India, Pune. An Indian “prime contractor” would assemble the engines from sub-components delivered by a network of sub-contractors. As reported, the DRDO had been trying to bring in international consultants for assistance in designing the engine. By then, German companies MTU and Renk had refused to provide consultancy and, as of then, consultancy proposals from Ricardo of Britain and AVL of Austria were being evaluated. DRDO had also issued an Expression of Interest (EoI) to select an Indian partner to manufacture the engine. The selected consultant will work in a consortium including DRDO, the Army (user), and the Indian manufacturing partner. As per the 2012 timeline, the programme includes 12 months for designing, an additional 18 months for prototype development – a total of 30–36 months to begin testing of the prototype.

As of February 2024, reports suggest the German-origin engine of Arjun Mk1A variant will be replaced by the DATRAN 1500 engine, which is being developed by DRDO and is currently under testing phase. This is because of the sudden closure of MTU Friedrichshafen's supply chain, which is expected to take four years more to restart.

The DATRAN 1500 engine had its first test in 2023. On 20 March 2024, the prototype engine was again successfully tested at BEML's Engine Division Mysuru facility. The engine has electronic control, a self-cleaning air filter, CRDi fuel injection system, and electronic warning control. In addition, the engine has a high power-to-weight ratio and can run in a variety of harsh environments, such as over 5,000 m (16,000 ft) above mean sea level, in sub-zero temperature of −40 °C, and up to +55 °C in a hot desert environment. A total of 20 prototypes of the engines, with an emphasis on technology stabilization, will be produced in 2024 and put through additional testing to evaluate their performance, robustness, and dependability. The project is expected to be completed by the middle of 2025.

The Bharat Power Pack weighs 2,200 kg (4,900 lb). After initial trials, the performance of the engine is to be tested on board a modified Arjun MBT prototype which would be heavier than the in-service main battle tanks of the Army or the MBTs the engine would power (Arjun variants, FMBT and FRCV). The engine could also be integrated on T-90MkIII (an advanced Indian variant) from 2027–28.

The director of CVRDE, the nodal laboratory under DRDO for the programme, had formally commenced the integration activities of the DATRAN Test Vehicle on 4 December 2025 by mounting one of the subsystems. The DATRAN Test Vehicle is a test platform for vehicle trials of the indigenous 1500 hp DATRAN transmission and the 1500 hp engine being developed by CVRDE. The power pack is in an advanced stage of development. Meanwhile, the testbed is being developed as the precursor for future AFV platforms. Shri S Srinivasa Rao is the Program Director (Powerpack) and Project Director (DATRAN-1500) whereas Shri S Mathi is the Project Manager (DATRAN-1500).

=== TRAWL Assembly ===
BEML and the Electro Pneumatics and Hydraulics (India) Private Limited received a contract worth around ₹975 crore (US$100 million) from the Indian Army to supply TRAWL Assembly, designed by DRDO, for its T-72 and T-90 fleet. The acquisition is aimed at enhancing the minefield breaching capability for the Armoured Corps. They will create Vehicle Safe Lanes through minefields with anti-tank mines by employing proximity magnetic fuses.

== Railways/metro rolling stock ==
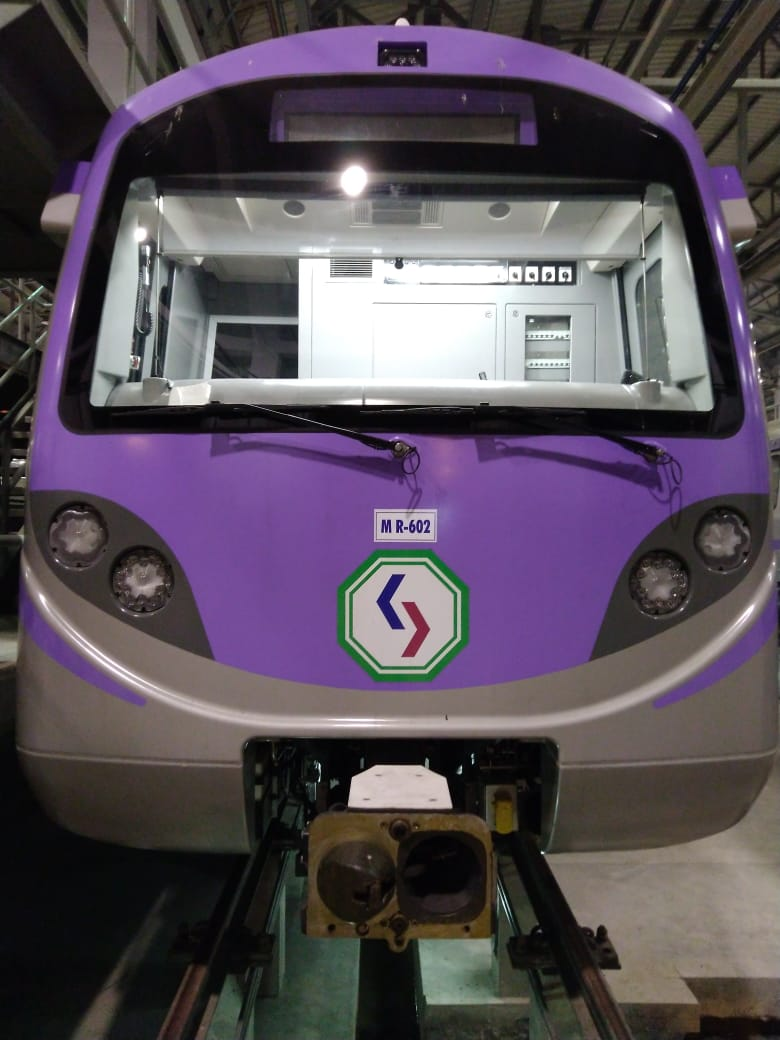
BEML ATO rolling stock for Kolkata Metro Green Line

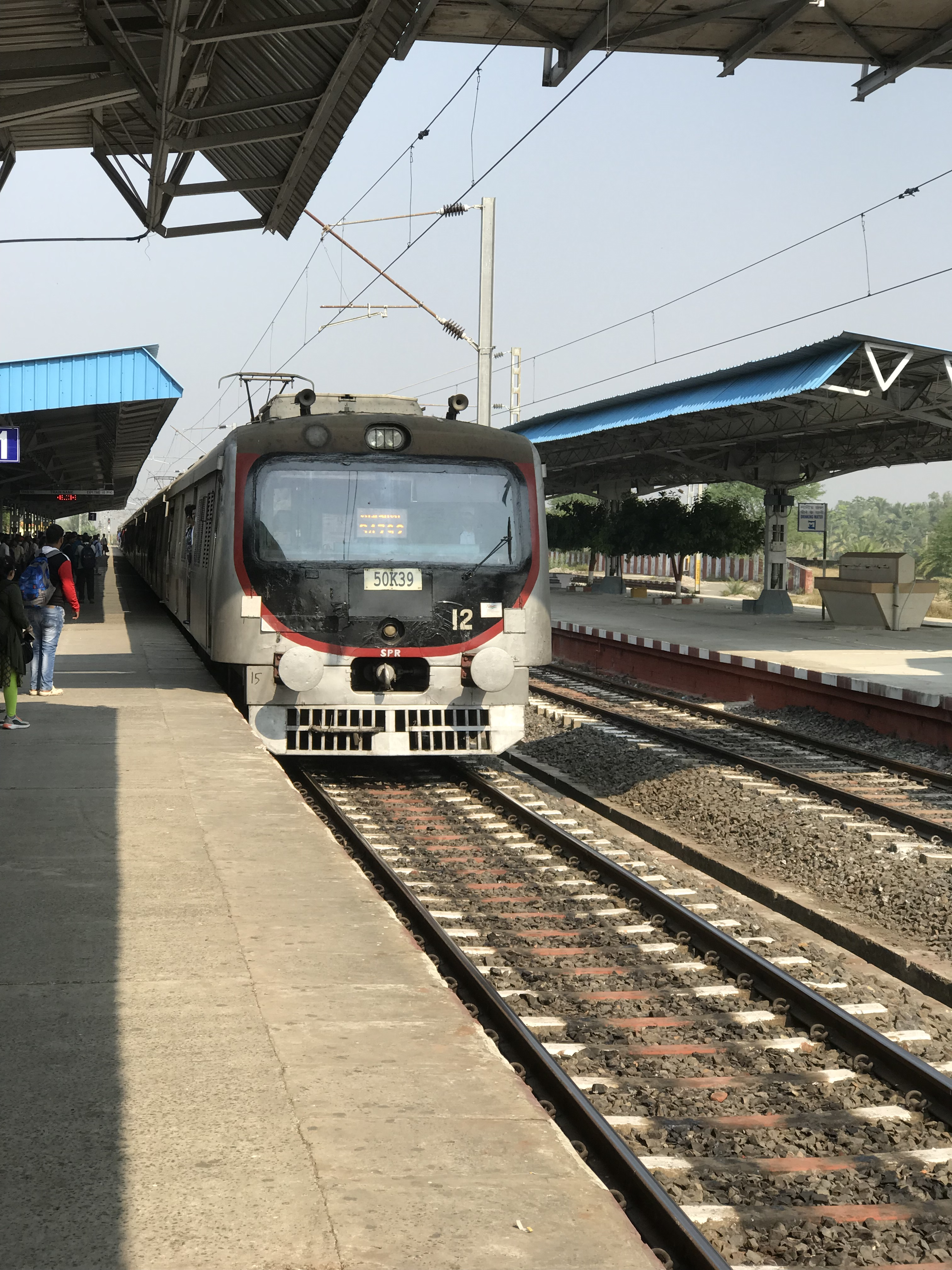
BEML SSEMU

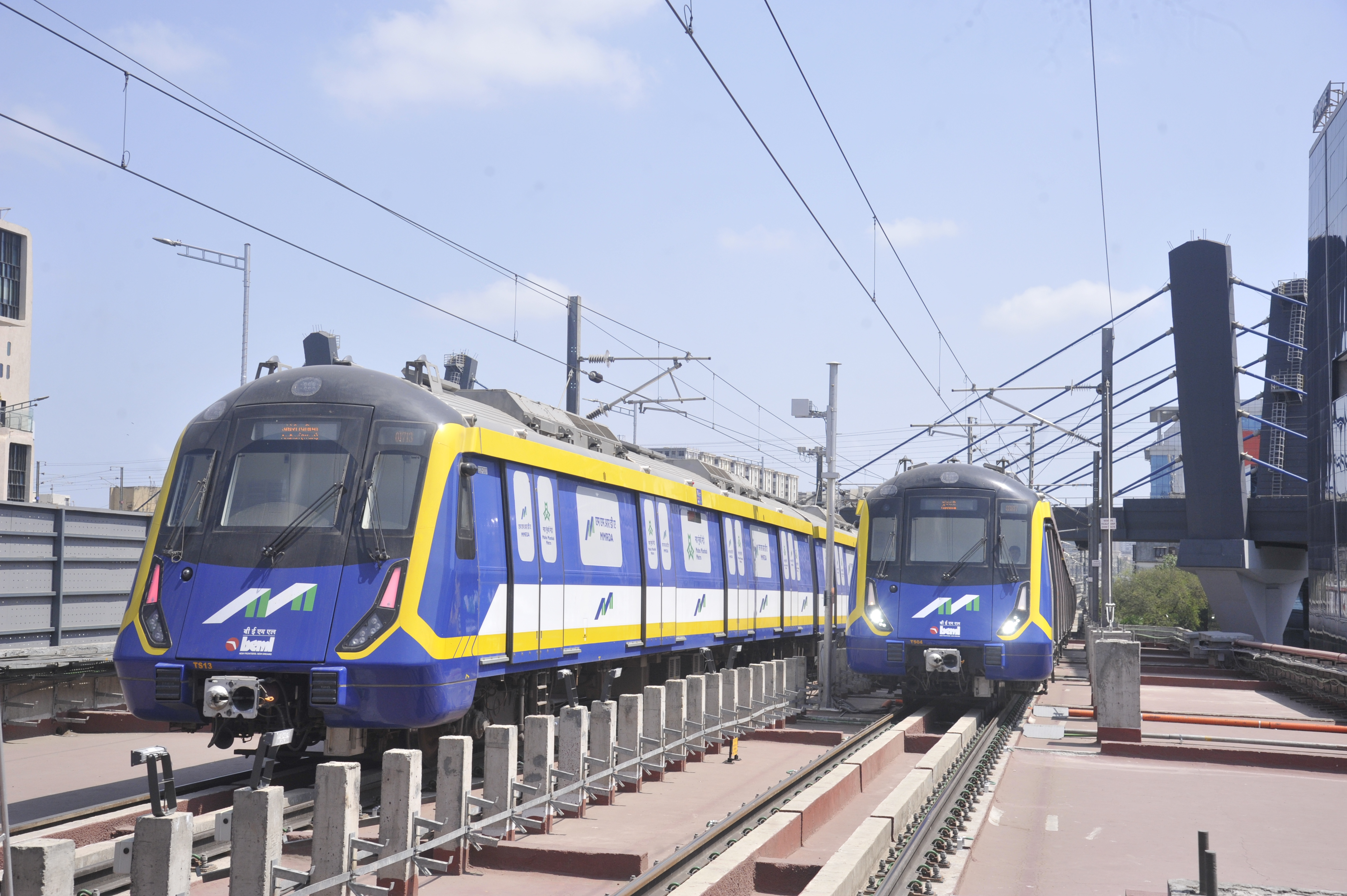
BEML rolling stock for Mumbai Metro Yellow Line

BEML Limited's Rail Coach Factory, situated in Bangalore, India, is the first all-steel integrated rail coach factory established by the Government of India in 1948. This factory was established to indigenously manufacture passenger rail coaches for Indian Railways.

BEML manufactures rolling stock for Indian Railways and metro systems. The company ventured into metro coach manufacturing in 2002, acquiring technology from Hyundai Rotem of South Korea. BEML has supplied over 2,000 metro coaches to various metro systems, including those in Delhi, Jaipur, Kolkata, Bengaluru, and Mumbai. Under its technical collaboration with Rotem, BEML manufactured 220 metro cars for the Delhi Metro Rail Corporation (DMRC) under the RS1 contract. In 2011, BEML secured a contract to manufacture, supply, test, and commission 10 train sets of four cars each, totalling 40 cars, for the Jaipur Metro Project.

In September 2008, BEML Limited secured a ₹31 crore (US$3.3 million) developmental contract from the Railway Board for the design, manufacture, supply, testing, and commissioning of two rakes comprising 18 stainless steel AC Electrical Multiple Unit (AC EMU) coaches.

BEML secured a contract worth approximately ₹900 crore (US$96 million) from Kolkata Metro Rail Corporation Limited (KMRCL) for the design, manufacture, supply, testing, and commissioning of 14 train sets, each comprising six cars, for the East-West Metro corridor of Kolkata Metro. The company completed the delivery of all 14 train sets in June 2020.

BEML Limited received a Letter of Acceptance (LoA) from Integral Coach Factory (ICF), Chennai, for the design, manufacture, and commissioning of 10 Vande Bharat Sleeper trainsets. The total order value was ₹675 crore (US$72 million), exclusive of taxes.

The Integral Coach Factory (ICF) awarded BEML an ₹866.87 crore (US$93 million) contract to design, manufacture, and commission two high-speed trainsets, each comprising eight cars. These will be India's first indigenously designed and manufactured high-speed trainsets, with a design speed of 280 km/h (170 mph) and an operational speed of 250 km/h (160 mph). They are scheduled for delivery by the end of 2026. Each car is priced at ₹27.86 crore (US$3.0 million).

BEML is one of India's leading manufacturers of rail and metro coaches. Metro systems using BEML rolling stock include:

- Delhi Metro: The company has supplied over 1,250 coaches to the Delhi Metro.
- Namma Metro (Bengaluru): Over 325 coaches have been supplied, with an additional order for 360 more coaches (60 train sets) for Phases 2, 2A, and 2B.
- Mumbai Metro: BEML has supplied 378 coaches for Lines 2 and 7.
- Kolkata Metro: BEML has supplied 84 metro cars for the East-West (Green) Line.
- Jaipur Metro: BEML has supplied 40 coaches.

== Infrastructure ==
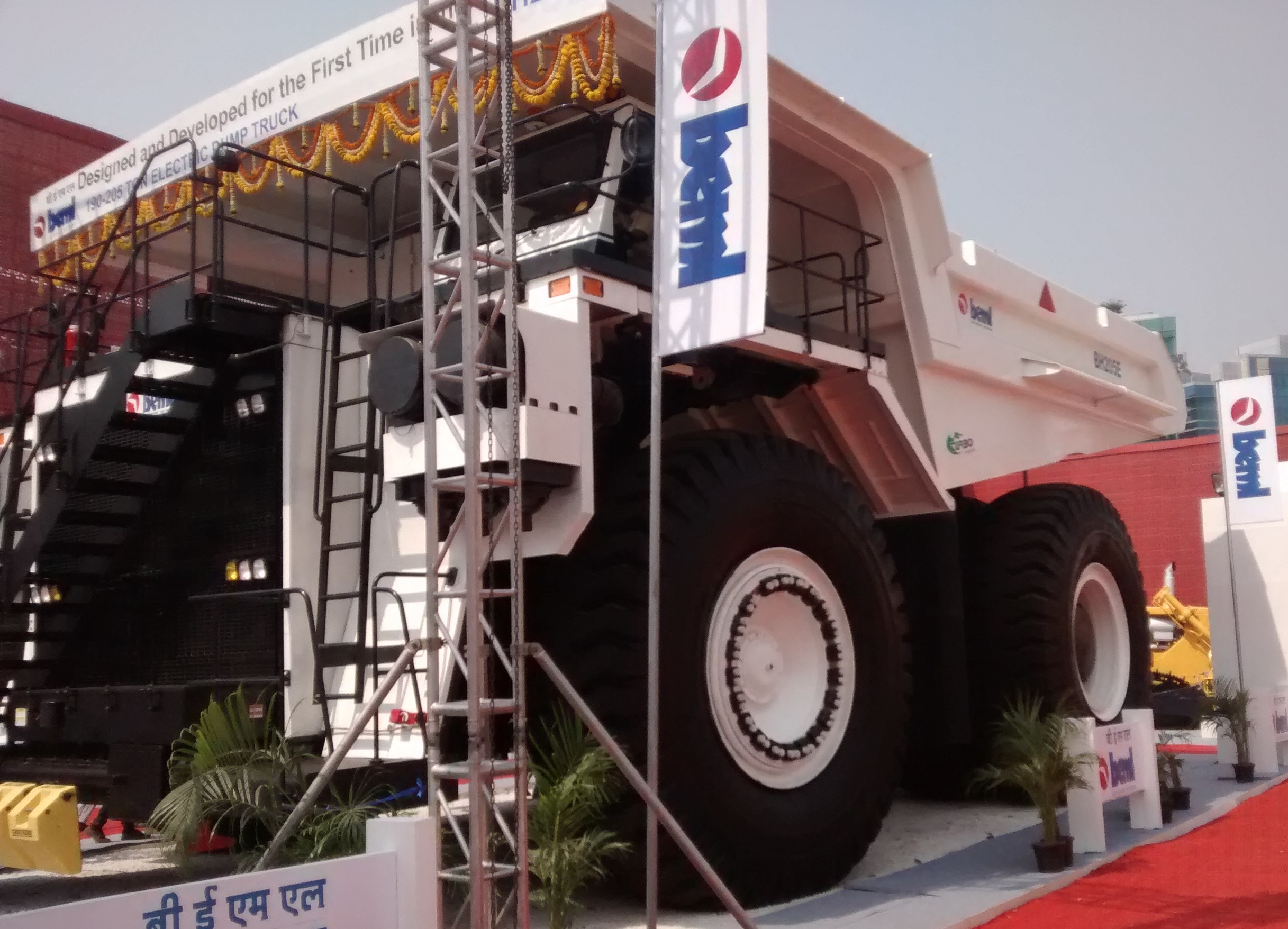
BEML 205 dumper

BEML operates in three major business verticals associated with equipment manufacturing:

- Mining & Construction
- Defence & Aerospace
- Rail & Metro

In addition to the above, there are strategic business units (SBUs):

- Trading Division for dealing in non-company products
- International Business Division for export activities
- Aerospace Division for design services for the aviation sector

BEML has the following manufacturing units spread over four locations:

- Kolar Gold Fields (KGF) Complex (around 100 km from Bengaluru)
  - Hubli Earth Moving Division
  - Rail Coach Unit II
  - Heavy Fabrication Unit
  - Hydraulic & Powerline Division
- Mysore Complex (around 130 km from Bengaluru)
  - Truck Division
  - Engine Division
  - Aerospace Manufacturing Division
- Bengaluru Complex - Rail & Metro Division
- Palakkad Complex Kerala State - defence products manufacturing
  - BEML - Tatra Trucks 12x12, 10x10, 8x8, 6x6, 4x4 & variants
  - Pontoon bridge system
  - Ground support vehicles for guided missile programme
  - Heavy, medium, and light recovery vehicles
  - 50T trailer for tank transportation
  - Mil rail coaches and mil wagons
  - Apart from the above, Railway parts and aggregates are planned for manufacture
- Vignyan Industries, a subsidiary located at Tarikere (around 300 km from Bengaluru) - steel castings

== Management ==
Shri Shantanu Roy assumed charge as Chairman & Managing Director at BEML Ltd from 01.08. 2023. Prior to assuming his present position, Shri Shantanu Roy was Director (Mining and Construction Business) after the superannuation of Shri M V Rajasekhar, the predecessor CMD of BEML Ltd, since 1 Feb 2021.

== Competitors ==
BEML faces competition from private-sector manufacturers in the mining and construction equipment industry, including Caterpillar, JCB India, Komatsu and L&T Construction & Mining Equipment. In FY2025–26, its Mining & Construction business contributed 41% of the company's total revenue, making it the largest of its three business verticals.

== Defense vehicles ==
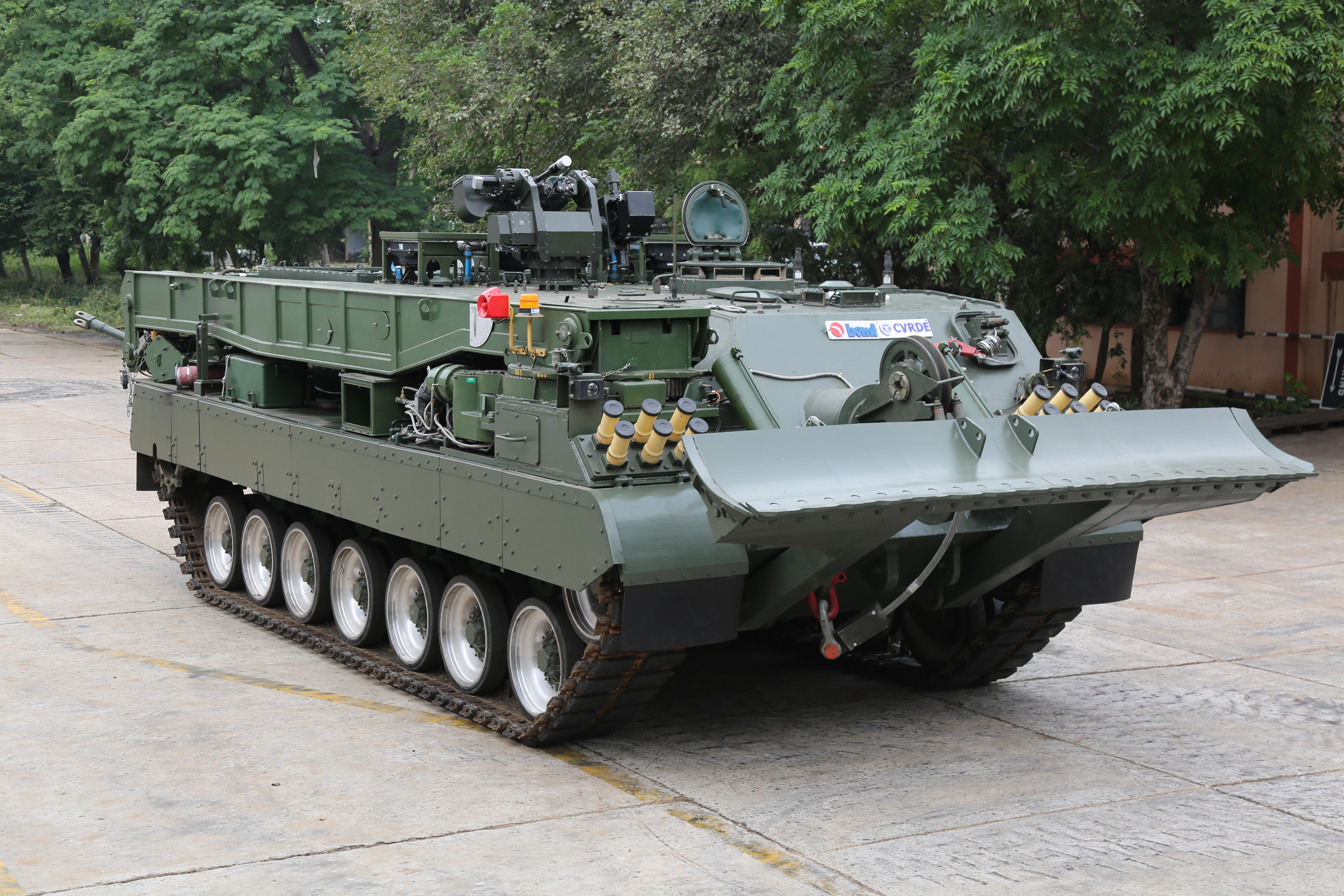
Arjun ARRV Armored vehicle manufactured by collaboration of BEML and CVRDE

BEML manufactures DRDO designed HMV, Arjun ARRV, Mobile Standby Command Post Vehicle (MSCPV)

- BEML Armored Vehicle Arjun ARRV
- BEML HMV 12×12 (Gross Vehicle Weight: 65 tons; developed by VRDE)

== Trailers ==
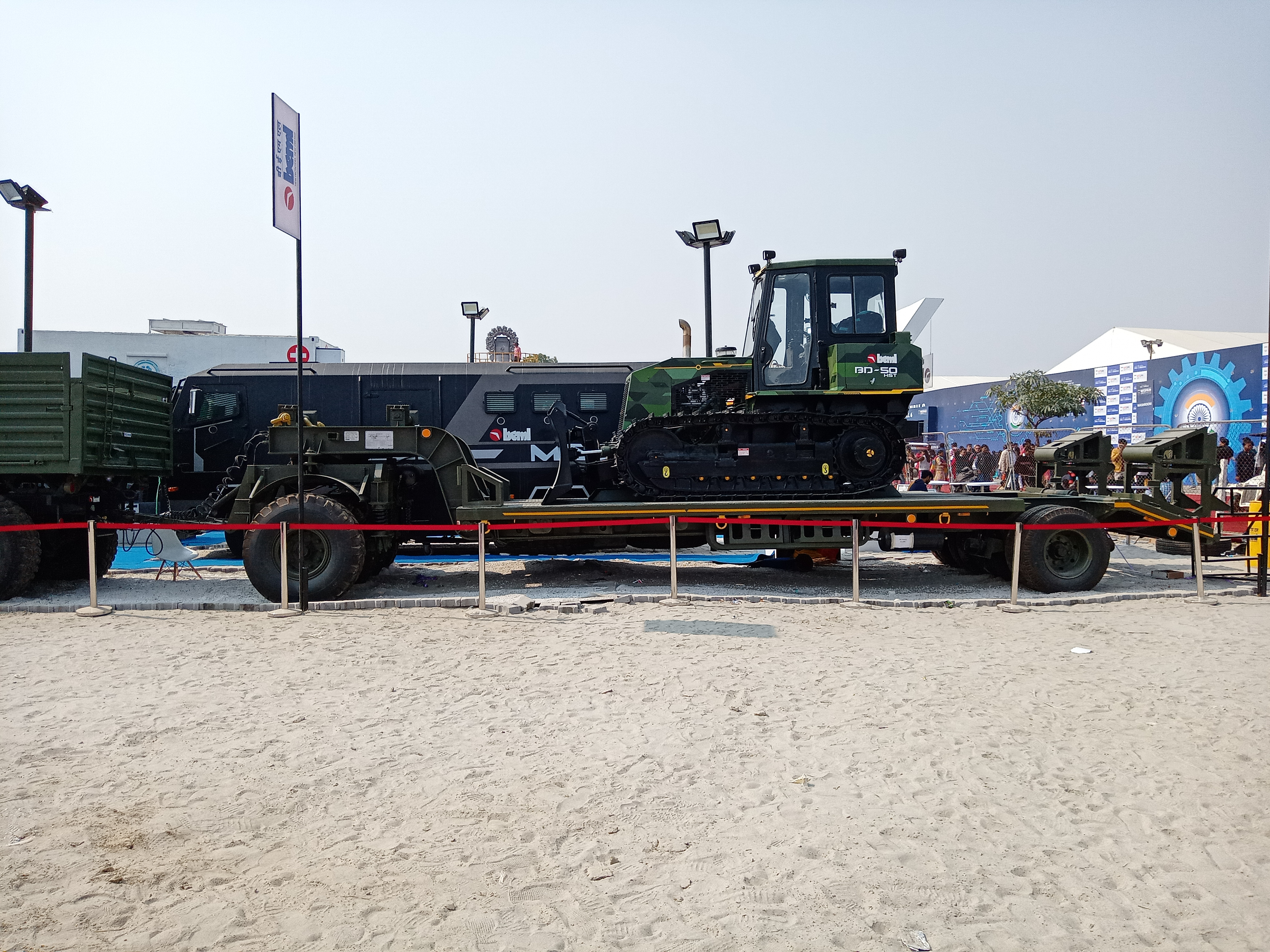
BEML BD50 bulldozer loaded on a BEML 20T trailer displayed at defense expo 2020 in Lucknow.

- 20 T: 20 Ton capacity 8-wheeled lowboy trailer developed for transportation of construction equipment on rough train. Can be coupled with tractor via 4 wheeled dolly.
- 50T: 50 Ton capacity 24-wheeled lowboy trailers developed for the transportation of mid-weight tanks on rough train. Can be coupled with a tractor via an 8-wheeled jeep dolly.
- 70T: 70 Ton capacity 5-axle row hydraulic modular trailer developed for transportation of heavy tanks on rough train. Can be coupled with ballast tractor via drawbar coupling.

== Controversy ==
In 2014, BEML made headlines when former army chief VK Singh alleged he was offered a bribe of 14 crores to clear sub-standard trucks for the army. These trucks, known as Tatra trucks, are supplied to BEML via a London agent for assembly. The CBI was investigating allegations of the bribe, as well as the alleged violation of basic rules by BEML, where defense equipment must be purchased directly from the manufacturer without involving middlemen.
