= Commission of Railway Safety =

Government of India's commission

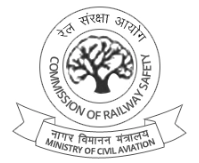
- Logo of The Commission of Railway Safety

Agency overview
- Formed: 1 November 1961; 64 years ago
- Preceding agency: Railway Inspectorate
- Jurisdiction: Government of India
- Headquarters: 3rd Floor, Traffic Accounts Building, State Entry Road, New Delhi Pin: 110055
- Agency executive: Janak Kumar Garg, Chief Commissioner of Railway Safety (CCRS)
- Parent agency: Ministry of Civil Aviation (India)
- Website: www.crs.gov.in

The Commission of Railway Safety is a government commission of India. Subordinate to the Ministry of Civil Aviation, the commission is the rail safety authority in India, as directed by The Railways Act, 1989.

The agency investigates serious rail accidents. Its head office is in New Delhi. As of 2023, Shri Janak Kumar Garg (IRSEE:1987) is the Chief Commissioner of Railway Safety (CCRS).

== Organisational structure and jurisdiction ==
The commission is headed by a Chief Commissioner of Railway Safety (CCRS), at Lucknow, who also acts as Principal Technical Advisor to the Central Government in all matters pertaining to railway safety. Working under the administrative control of CCRS are 9 Commissioners of Railway Safety (CRS), each one exercising jurisdiction over one or more of the 17 Zonal Railways. In addition, Metro Railway (Kolkata), DMRC (Delhi), MRTS (Chennai) and Konkan Railway also fall under their jurisdiction. There are 5 deputy commissioners of railway safety posted in the headquarters at Lucknow for assisting the CCRS as and when required. In addition, there are 2 field deputy commissioners, one each in Mumbai and Kolkata, to assist the commissioners of railway safety in matters concerning the signalling and telecommunication disciplines.

Formerly the head office was in the North-East Railway Compound in Lucknow.

== See also ==
- Aircraft Accident Investigation Bureau – Indian air accident investigation agency
