= Charlapalli–Anakapalle AC Express =

Train in India

Overview
- Service type: AC Express
- Status: Active
- Locale: Telangana and Andhra Pradesh
- First service: 8 May 2026; 15 days ago (Inaugural); 14 May 2026; 9 days ago (Commercial)
- Current operator: South Central Railways (SCR)

Route
- Termini: Charlapalli (CHZ); Anakapalle (AKP)
- Stops: 13
- Distance travelled: 618 km (384 mi)
- Average journey time: 12 hrs 50 mins
- Service frequency: Bi - Weekly
- Train number: 17053/17054

On-board services
- Classes: AC 1-tier (H1); AC 2-tier (A1); AC 3-tier (B1)
- Seating arrangements: No
- Sleeping arrangements: Yes
- Auto-rack arrangements: Upper
- Catering facilities: No
- Observation facilities: Large windows
- Entertainment facilities: No

Technical
- Rolling stock: LHB coach
- Track gauge: Indian gauge
- Electrification: 25 kV 50 Hz AC overhead line
- Operating speed: 48 km (30 mi)
- Track owner: Indian Railways
- Rake sharing: Yes

The 17053/17054 Charlapalli–Anakapalle AC Express is India's 29th AC Express train of Indian Railways, which belongs to South Eastern Railway zone that runs between the city of Charlapalli of Telangana and Anakapalle of Andhra Pradesh in India.

The express train is inaugurated on 8 May 2026 by Honorable Prime Minister Narendra Modi through video conference.

== Overview ==
The train is operated by Indian Railways, connecting Charlapalli and Anakapalle. It is currently operated 17053/17054 on weekly basis.

== Schedule ==
Train Schedule: Charlapalli ↔ Anakapalle AC Express
| Train No. | Station Code | Departure Station | Departure Time | Departure Day | Arrival Station | Arrival Hours |
|---|---|---|---|---|---|---|
| 17053 | CHZ | Charlapalli | 10:10 PM | Anakapalle | 11:00 AM | 12h 50m |
| 17054 | AKP | Anakapalle | 05:35 PM | Charlapalli | 06:40 AM | 13h 5m |

== Routes and halts ==
The Important Halts of the train are :

- Charlapalli
- Nalgonda
- Guntur Junction
- Vijayawada Junction
- Eluru
- Tadepalligudem
- Nidadavolu Junction
- Rajahmundry
- Samalkot Junction
- Annavaram
- Tuni
- Elamanchili
- Anakapalle

== Coach composition ==
1. AC 2nd Class – 4
2. AC 3rd Class – 15
3. AC 1st Class – 1

== Rake reversal or rake share ==
The train has 2 rake share :

1. Visakhapatnam–Secunderabad Duronto Express (22203/22204)
2. Lokmanya Tilak Terminus–Secunderabad AC Duronto Express (12219/12220)

== See also ==
Trains from Charlapalli :

1. Charlapalli–Shalimar Amrit Bharat Express
2. Charlapalli–Tiruchanur Express (via Warangal)
3. Chennai–Charlapalli Superfast Express
4. Charlapalli–Bhubaneswar New Express
5. Charlapalli–Anakapalle Express (via Warangal)

Trains from Anakapalle :

No trains from Anakapalle

== Notes ==
a. Runs 2 day in a week with both directions.
