= Visakhapatnam–Charlapalli Express =

Train in India

Visakhapatnam - Charlapalli Express

Overview
- Service type: Express
- Status: Active
- Locale: Andhra Pradesh and Telangana
- First service: 3 April 2026; 2 months ago
- Current operator: East Coast Railway (ECoR)

Route
- Termini: Visakhapatnam Junction (VSKP); Charlapalli (CHZ)
- Stops: 14
- Distance travelled: 683 km (424 mi)
- Average journey time: 14h 30m
- Service frequency: Weekly
- Train number: 18527 / 18528

On-board services
- Classes: General Unreserved, Sleeper Class, AC 3rd Class, AC 3rd Class Economy, AC 2nd Class
- Seating arrangements: Yes
- Sleeping arrangements: Yes
- Catering facilities: Pantry Car
- Observation facilities: Large windows
- Baggage facilities: No
- Other facilities: Below the seats

Technical
- Rolling stock: LHB coach
- Track gauge: 1,676 mm (5 ft 6 in)
- Electrification: 25 kV 50 Hz AC Overhead line
- Operating speed: 130 km/h (81 mph) maximum, 47 km/h (29 mph) average including halts.
- Track owner: Indian Railways
Route map
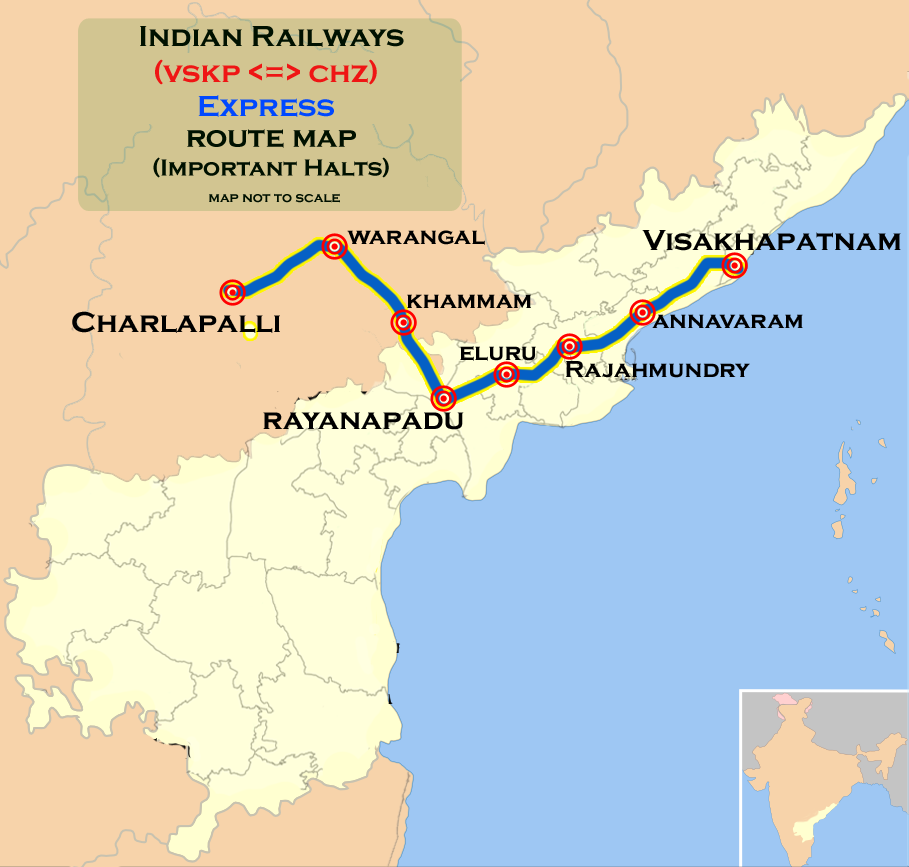

The 18527 / 18528 Visakhapatnam–Charlapalli Express is an express train belonging to East Coast Railway zone that runs between the city Visakhapatnam Junction of Andhra Pradesh and Charlapalli of Telangana in India.

It operates as train number 18527 from Visakhapatnam Junction to Charlapalli and as train number 18528 in the reverse direction, serving the states of Andhra Pradesh and Telangana.

== Services ==
• 18527/ Visakhapatnam–Charlapalli Express has an average speed of 47 km/h and covers 683 km in 14h 30m.

• 18528/ Charlapalli–Visakhapatnam Express has an average speed of 46 km/h and covers 683 km in 14h 50m.

== Route and halts ==
The important halts of the train are :

- Visakhapatnam Junction
- Duvvada
- Anakapalle
- Elamanchili
- Tuni
- Annavaram
- Samalkot Junction
- Rajahmundry
- Eluru
- Rayanpadu
- Khammam
- Warangal
- Kazipet Junction
- Charlapalli

== Schedule ==
• 18527 – 5:30 pm (Friday) [Visakhapatnam Junction]

• 18528 – 2:30 pm (Saturday) [Charlapalli]

== Coach composition ==
1. General Unreserved – 4
2. Sleeper Class – 6
3. AC 3rd Class – 1
4. AC 3rd Class Economy – 1
5. AC 2nd Class – 1

== Traction ==
As the entire route is fully electrified, it is hauled by a Royapuram Shed-based WAP-7 electric locomotive from Visakhapatnam Junction to Charlapalli and vice versa.

== Rake reversal or rake share ==
No rake reversal or rake share.

== See also ==
Trains from Visakhapatnam Junction :

1. Kollam–Visakhapatnam Express
2. Visakhapatnam–Gandhidham Express
3. Visakhapatnam–Tirupati Double Decker Express
4. Tirumala Express
5. Visakhapatnam–Secunderabad Vande Bharat Express

Trains from Charlapalli :

1. Charlapalli – Thiruvananthapuram North Amrit Bharat Express
2. Charlapalli–Shalimar Amrit Bharat Express
3. Gorakhpur–Charlapalli Express
4. Muzaffarpur–Charlapalli Amrit Bharat Express
5. Chennai–Charlapalli Superfast Express

== Notes ==
a. Runs one day in a week with both directions.
