= Charlapalli–Anakapalle Express (via Warangal) =

Train in India

Charlapalli - Anakapalle Express

Overview
- Service type: Express
- Status: Active
- Locale: Telangana and Andhra Pradesh
- First service: 9 May 2026; 3 months ago
- Current operator: South Central Railway (SCR)

Route
- Termini: Charlapalli (CHZ); Anakapalle (AKP)
- Stops: 16
- Distance travelled: 651 km (405 mi)
- Average journey time: 13h 20m
- Service frequency: Weekly
- Train number: 17045 / 17046

On-board services
- Classes: General Unreserved, Sleeper Class, AC 3rd Class, AC 2nd Class
- Seating arrangements: Yes
- Sleeping arrangements: Yes
- Catering facilities: Pantry Car
- Observation facilities: Large windows
- Baggage facilities: No
- Other facilities: Below the seats

Technical
- Rolling stock: ICF coach
- Track gauge: 1,676 mm (5 ft 6 in)
- Electrification: 25 kV 50 Hz AC Overhead line
- Operating speed: 130 km/h (81 mph) maximum, 49 km/h (30 mph) average including halts.
- Track owner: Indian Railways
Route map
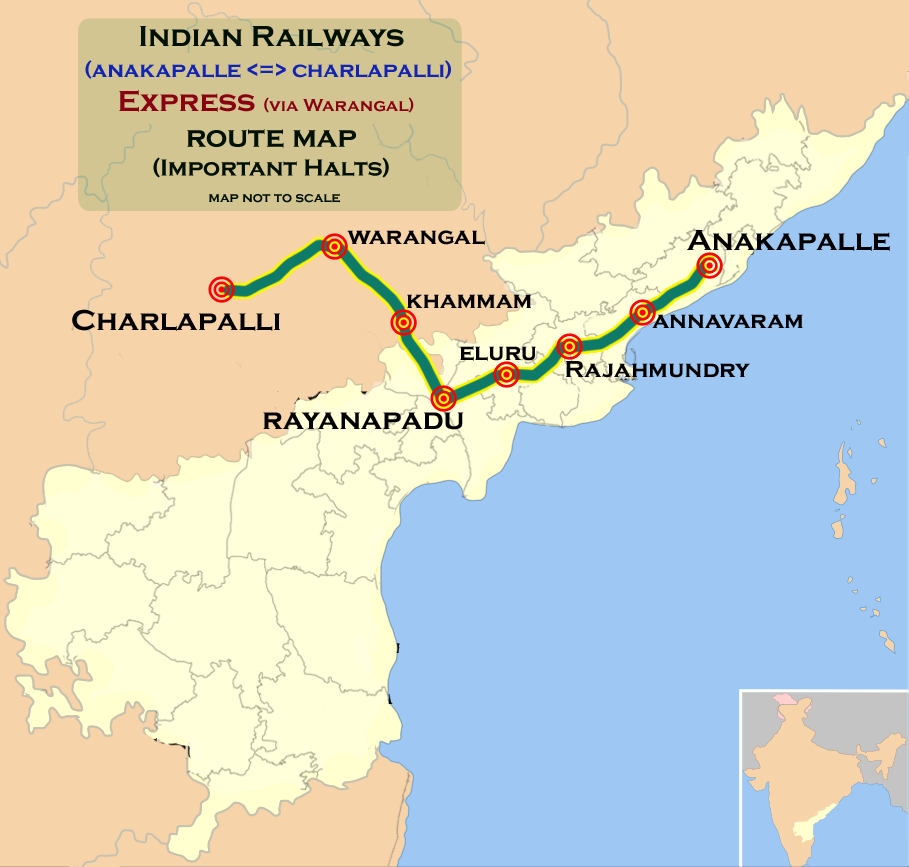

The 17045 / 17046 Charlapalli–Anakapalle Express (via Warangal) is an express train belonging to South Central Railway zone that runs between the city Charlapalli of Telangana and Anakapalle of Andhra Pradesh in India.

It operates as train number 17045 from Charlapalli to Anakapalle and as train number 17046 in the reverse direction, serving the states of Andhra Pradesh and Telangana.

== Services ==
• 17045/ Charlapalli–Anakapalle Express has an average speed of 49 km/h and covers 651 km in 13h 20m.

• 17046/ Anakapalle–Charlapalli Express has an average speed of 47 km/h and covers 651 km in 13h 45m.

== Route and halts ==
The important halts of the train are :

- Charlapalli
- Jangaon
- Kazipet Junction
- Warangal
- Mahabubabad
- Khammam
- Rayanapadu
- Eluru
- Tadepalligudem
- Nidadavolu Junction
- Rajahmundry
- Samalkot Junction
- Annavaram
- Tuni
- Elamanchili
- Anakapalle

== Schedule ==
• 17045 – 8:05 pm (Saturday) [Charlapalli]

• 17046 – 5:35 pm (Sunday) [Anakapalle]

== Coach composition ==
1. General Unreserved – 4
2. Sleeper Class – 9
3. AC 3rd Class – 7
4. AC 2nd Class – 2

== Traction ==
As the entire route is fully electrified, it is hauled by a Vijayawada Shed-based WAP-7 electric locomotive from Charlapalli to Anakapalle and vice versa.

== Rake reversal or rake share ==
No rake reversal or rake share.

== See also ==
Trains from Charlapalli :

1. Muzaffarpur–Charlapalli Amrit Bharat Express
2. Charlapalli–Narasapur Express
3. Charlapalli–Tiruchanur Express (via Warangal)
4. East Coast Express
5. Charlapalli–Tiruchanur Express (via Kurnool City)

No trains from Anakapalle

== Notes ==
a. Runs one day in a week with both directions.
