= Charlapalli–Tiruchanur Express (via Kurnool City) =

Train in India

Charlapalli - Tiruchanur Express

Overview
- Service type: Express
- Status: Active
- Locale: Telangana and Andhra Pradesh
- First service: 10 May 2026; 6 days ago
- Current operator: South Central Railway (SCR)

Route
- Termini: Charlapalli (CHZ); Tiruchanur (TCNR)
- Stops: 2
- Distance travelled: 643 km (400 mi)
- Average journey time: 15h 55m
- Service frequency: Weekly
- Train number: 17059 / 17060

On-board services
- Classes: General Unreserved, Sleeper Class, AC 3rd Class, AC 2nd Class
- Seating arrangements: Yes
- Sleeping arrangements: Yes
- Catering facilities: Pantry Car
- Observation facilities: Large windows
- Baggage facilities: No
- Other facilities: Below the seats

Technical
- Rolling stock: LHB coach
- Track gauge: 1,676 mm (5 ft 6 in)
- Electrification: 25 kV 50 Hz AC Overhead line
- Operating speed: 130 km/h (81 mph) maximum, 40 km/h (25 mph) average including halts.
- Track owner: Indian Railways
Route map
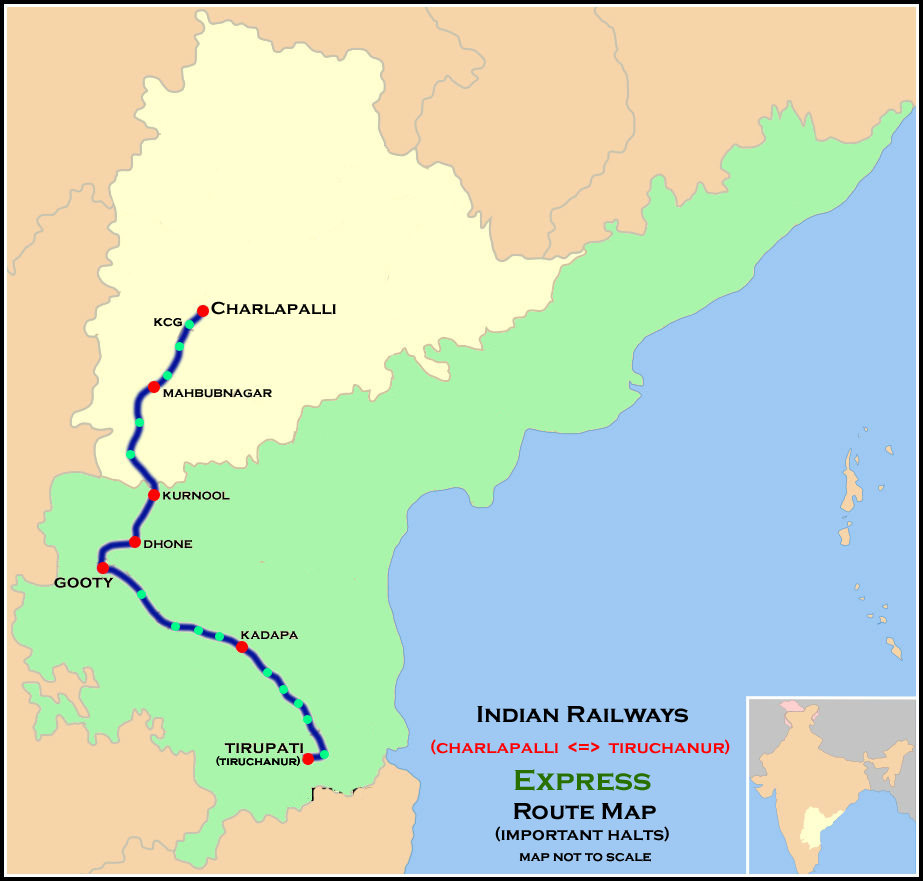

The 17059 / 17060 Charlapalli–Tiruchanur Express (via Kurnool City) is an express train belonging to South Central Railway zone that runs between the city Charlapalli of Telangana and Tiruchanur of Andhra Pradesh in India.

It operates as train number 17059 from Charlapalli to Tiruchanur and as train number 17060 in the reverse direction, serving the states of Andhra Pradesh and Telangana.

== Services ==
• 17059/ Charlapalli–Tiruchanur Express has an average speed of 40 km/h and covers 643 km in 15h 55m.

• 17060/ Charlapalli–Tiruchanur Express has an average speed of 40 km/h and covers 643 km in 16h 5m.

== Route and halts ==
The important halts of the train are :

- Charlapalli
- Tiruchanur

== Schedule ==
• 17059 – 9:15 pm (Sunday) [Charlapalli]

• 17060 – 4:30 pm (Monday) [Tiruchanur]

== Coach composition ==
1. General Unreserved – 4
2. Sleeper Class – 7
3. AC 3rd Class – 7
4. AC 2nd Class – 2

== Traction ==
As the entire route is fully electrified, it is hauled by a Royapuram Shed-based WAP-7 electric locomotive from Charlapalli to Tiruchanur and vice versa.

== Rake reversal or rake share ==
The train will Rake Sharing with as follows :

1. Seven Hills Express (12769/12770)
2. Tirupati–Karimnagar Superfast Express (12761/12762)
3. Hyderabad–Raxaul Express (17005/17006)
4. Secunderabad–Darbhanga Express (17007/17008)
5. Charlapalli–Tiruchanur Express (via Warangal) (17047/17048)

== See also ==
Trains from Charlapalli :

1. Kamakhya–Charlapalli Amrit Bharat Express
2. Charlapalli–Narasapur Express
3. Charlapalli–Bhubaneswar New Express
4. Charlapalli – Thiruvananthapuram North Amrit Bharat Express
5. Gorakhpur–Charlapalli Express

No trains from Tiruchanur

== Notes ==
a. Runs one day in a week with both directions.
