= Tirupati–Charlapalli Express (via Proddatur) =

Train in India

Tirupati - Charlapalli Express

Overview
- Service type: Express
- Status: Active
- Locale: Andhra Pradesh and Telangana
- First service: 12 May 2026; 41 days ago
- Current operator: South Coast Railway zone (SCoR)

Route
- Termini: Tirupati (TPTY); Charlapalli (CHZ)
- Stops: 2
- Distance travelled: 650 km (404 mi)
- Average journey time: 15h 55m
- Service frequency: Weekly
- Train number: 17441 / 17442

On-board services
- Classes: General Unreserved, Sleeper Class, AC 3rd Class, AC 2nd Class
- Seating arrangements: Yes
- Sleeping arrangements: Yes
- Catering facilities: Pantry Car
- Observation facilities: Large windows
- Baggage facilities: No
- Other facilities: Below the seats

Technical
- Rolling stock: LHB coach
- Track gauge: 1,676 mm (5 ft 6 in)
- Electrification: 25 kV 50 Hz AC Overhead line
- Operating speed: 130 km/h (81 mph) maximum, 41 km/h (25 mph) average including halts.
- Track owner: Indian Railways
Route map
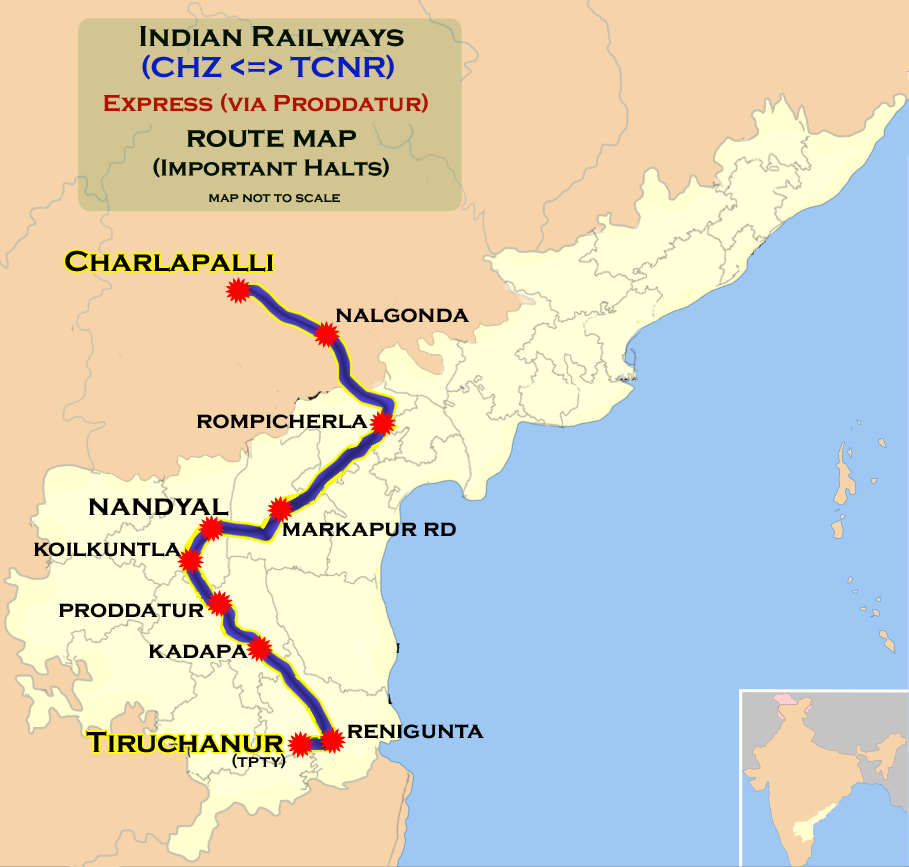

The 17441 / 17442 Tirupati–Charlapalli Express (via Proddatur) is an express train belonging to South Coast Railway zone that runs between the city Tirupati of Andhra Pradesh and Charlapalli of Telangana in India.

It operates as train number 17441 from Tirupati to Charlapalli and as train number 17442 in the reverse direction, serving the states of Telangana and Andhra Pradesh.

== Services ==
• 17441/ Tirupati–Charlapalli Express has an average speed of 41 km/h and covers 650 km in 15h 55m.

• 17442/ Charlapalli–Tirupati Express has an average speed of 43 km/h and covers 650 km in 15h 10m.

== Route and halts ==
The important halts of the train are :

- Tirupati
- Charlapalli

== Schedule ==
• 17441 – 4:30 pm (Tuesday) [Tirupati]

• 17442 – 9:20 pm (Wednesday) [Charlapalli]

== Coach composition ==
1. General Unreserved – 4
2. Sleeper Class – 14
3. AC 3rd Class – 3
4. AC 2nd Class – 2

== Traction ==
As the entire route is fully electrified, it is hauled by a Royapuram Shed-based WAP-7 electric locomotive from Tirupati to Charlapalli and vice versa.

== Rake reversal or rake share ==
The train will Rake Sharing with as follows :

1. Tirupati–Pandharpur Express (17437/17438)

== See also ==
Trains from Tirupati :

1. Tirupati–Srikakulam Road Humsafar Express
2. Tirupati–Narasapur Express
3. Tirupati–Sainagar Shirdi Weekly Express (via Guntur)
4. Visakhapatnam–Tirupati Double Decker Express
5. Sapthagiri Express

Trains from Charlapalli :

1. Kamakhya–Charlapalli Amrit Bharat Express
2. Charlapalli–Narasapur Express
3. Charlapalli–Bhubaneswar New Express
4. Charlapalli – Thiruvananthapuram North Amrit Bharat Express
5. Gorakhpur–Charlapalli Express

== Notes ==
a. Runs one day in a week with both directions.
