= Charlapalli–Bhubaneswar New Express =

Train in India

Charlapalli - Bhubaneswar New Express

Overview
- Service type: Express
- Status: Active
- Locale: Telangana, Andhra Pradesh and Odisha
- First service: 3 April 2026; 37 days ago
- Current operator: South Central Railway (SCR)

Route
- Termini: Charlapalli (CHZ); Bhubaneswar New (BBSN)
- Stops: 3
- Distance travelled: 1,093 km (679 mi)
- Average journey time: 23h 5m
- Service frequency: Weekly
- Train number: 17067 / 17068

On-board services
- Classes: General Unreserved, Sleeper Class, AC 3rd Class, AC 2nd Class
- Seating arrangements: Yes
- Sleeping arrangements: Yes
- Catering facilities: Pantry Car
- Observation facilities: Large windows
- Baggage facilities: No
- Other facilities: Below the seats

Technical
- Rolling stock: ICF coach
- Track gauge: 1,676 mm (5 ft 6 in)
- Electrification: 25 kV 50 Hz AC Overhead line
- Operating speed: 130 km/h (81 mph) maximum, 47 km/h (29 mph) average including halts.
- Track owner: Indian Railways
Route map
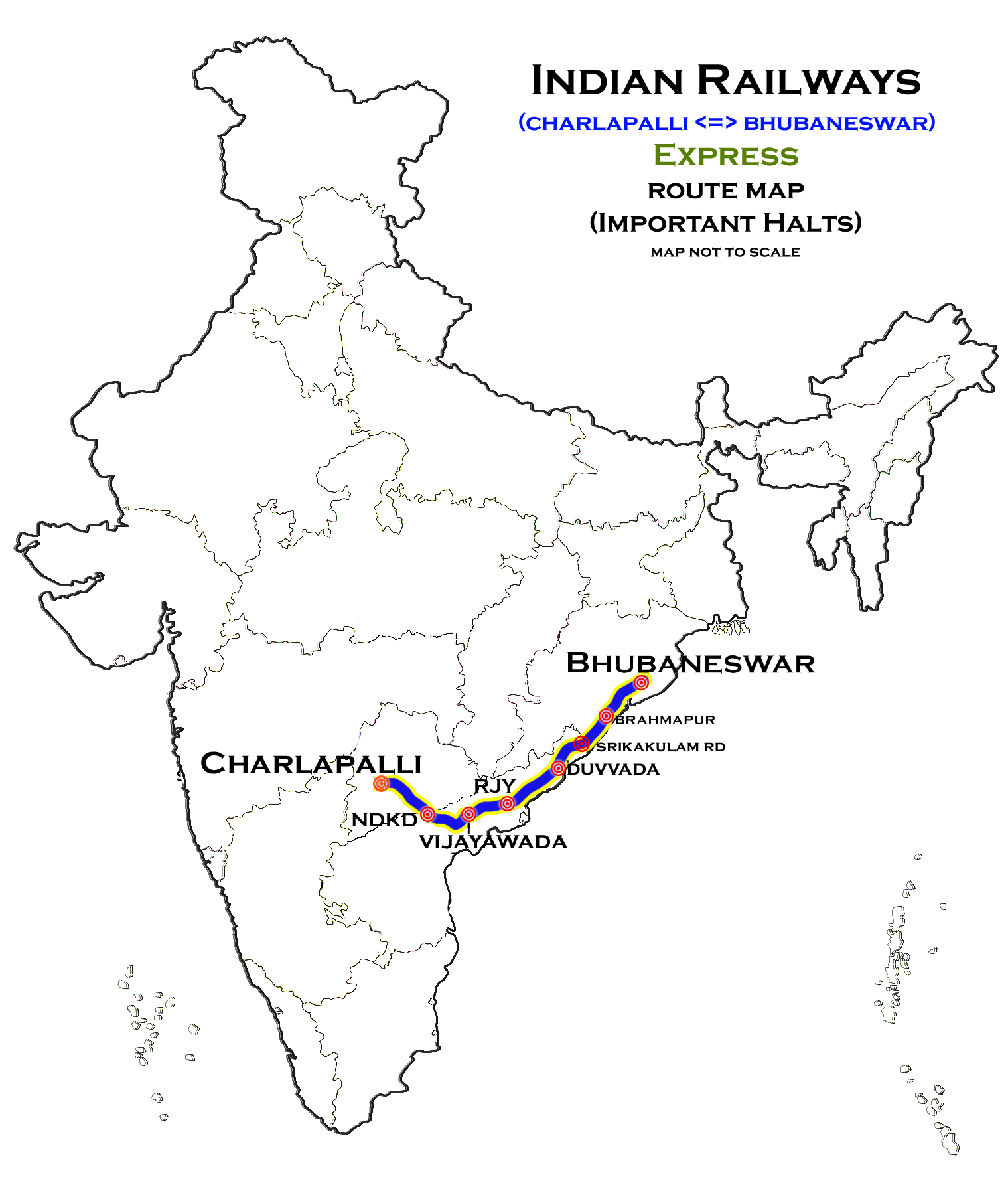

The 17067 / 17068 Charlapalli–Bhubaneswar New Express is an express train belonging to South Central Railway zone that runs between the city Charlapalli of Telangana and Bhubaneswar New of Odisha in India.

It operates as train number 17067 from Charlapalli to Bhubaneswar New and as train number 17068 in the reverse direction, serving the states of Odisha, Andhra Pradesh and Telangana.

== Services ==
• 17067/ Charlapalli–Bhubaneswar New Express has an average speed of 47 km/h and covers 1093 km in 23h 5m.

• 17068/ Bhubaneswar New–Charlapalli Express has an average speed of 43 km/h and covers 1093 km in 23h 30m.

== Route and halts ==
The important halts of the train are :

- Charlapalli
- Duvvada
- Bhubaneswar New

== Schedule ==
• 18527 – 6:10 pm (Monday) [Charlapalli]

• 18528 – 10:30 pm (Tuesday) [Bhubaneswar New]

== Coach composition ==
1. General Unreserved – 4
2. Sleeper Class – 10
3. AC 3rd Class – 5
4. AC 2nd Class – 3

== Traction ==
As the entire route is fully electrified, it is hauled by a Royapuram Shed-based WAP-7 electric locomotive from Charlapalli to Bhubaneswar New and vice versa.

== Rake reversal or rake share ==
The train will Rake Sharing with Charlapalli–Narasapur Express (17061/17062).

== See also ==
Trains from Charlapalli :

1. Gorakhpur–Charlapalli Express
2. Charlapalli–Shalimar Amrit Bharat Express
3. Visakhapatnam–Charlapalli Express
4. Charlapalli – Thiruvananthapuram North Amrit Bharat Express
5. Kamakhya–Charlapalli Amrit Bharat Express

Trains from Bhubaneswar New :

1. Visakha Express
2. Konark Express
3. Bhubaneshwar–Visakhapatnam Intercity Express

== Notes ==
a. Runs one day in a week with both directions.
