= Charlapalli–Tiruchanur Express (via Warangal) =

Train in India

Charlapalli - Tiruchanur Express

Overview
- Service type: Express
- Status: Active
- Locale: Telangana and Andhra Pradesh
- First service: 6 May 2026; 2 months ago
- Current operator: South Central Railway (SCR)

Route
- Termini: Charlapalli (CHZ); Tiruchanur (TCNR)
- Stops: 2
- Distance travelled: 643 km (400 mi)
- Average journey time: 13h 35m
- Service frequency: Weekly
- Train number: 17047 / 17048

On-board services
- Classes: General Unreserved, Sleeper Class, AC 3rd Class, AC 2nd Class
- Seating arrangements: Yes
- Sleeping arrangements: Yes
- Catering facilities: Pantry Car
- Observation facilities: Large windows
- Baggage facilities: No
- Other facilities: Below the seats

Technical
- Rolling stock: LHB coach
- Track gauge: 1,676 mm (5 ft 6 in)
- Electrification: 25 kV 50 Hz AC Overhead line
- Operating speed: 130 km/h (81 mph) maximum, 47 km/h (29 mph) average including halts.
- Track owner: Indian Railways
Route map
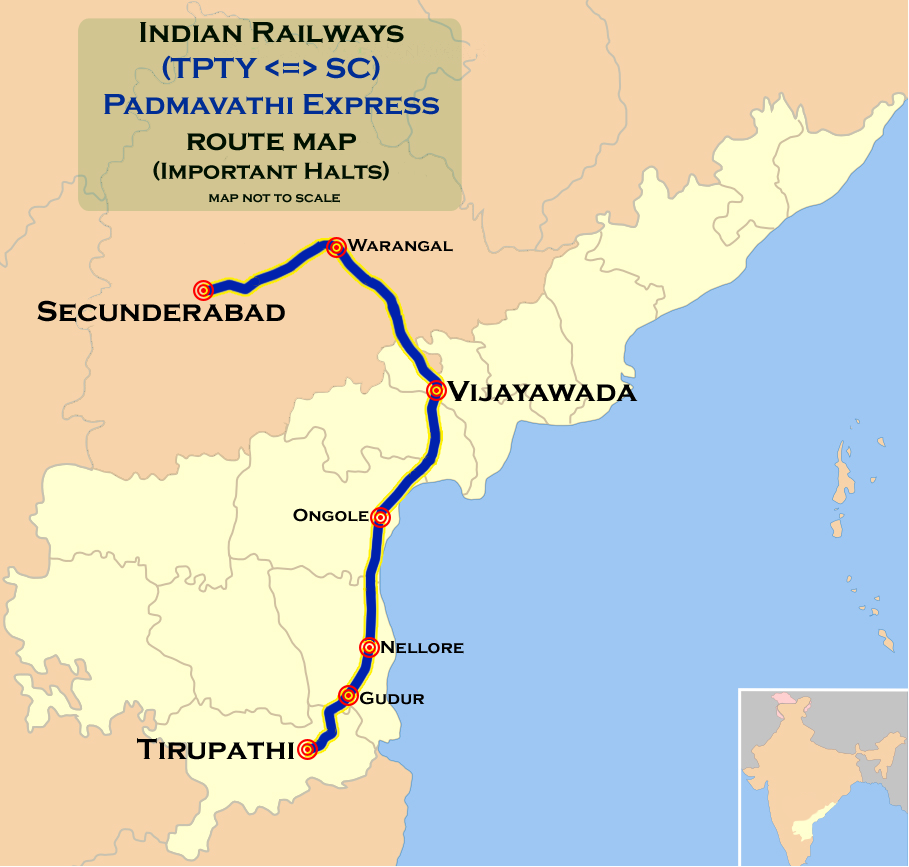

The 17047 / 17048 Charlapalli–Tiruchanur Express (via Warangal) is an express train belonging to South Central Railway zone that runs between the city Charlapalli of Telangana and Tiruchanur of Andhra Pradesh in India.

It operates as train number 17047 from Charlapalli to Tiruchanur and as train number 17048 in the reverse direction, serving the states of Andhra Pradesh and Telangana.

== Services ==
• 17047/ Charlapalli–Tiruchanur Express has an average speed of 47 km/h and covers 643 km in 13h 35m.

• 17048/ Charlapalli–Tiruchanur Express has an average speed of 43 km/h and covers 643 km in 14h 50m.

== Route and halts ==
The important halts of the train are :

- Charlapalli
- Tiruchanur

== Schedule ==
• 17047 – 6:55 pm (Wednesday) [Charlapalli]

• 17048 – 4:55 pm (Thursday) [Tiruchanur]

== Coach composition ==
1. General Unreserved – 4
2. Sleeper Class – 7
3. AC 3rd Class – 7
4. AC 2nd Class – 2

== Traction ==
As the entire route is fully electrified, it is hauled by a Royapuram Shed-based WAP-7 electric locomotive from Charlapalli to Tiruchanur and vice versa.

== Rake reversal or rake share ==
The train will Rake Sharing with as follows :

1. Seven Hills Express (12769/12770)
2. Tirupati–Karimnagar Superfast Express (12761/12762)

== See also ==
Trains from Charlapalli :

1. Kamakhya–Charlapalli Amrit Bharat Express
2. Charlapalli–Narasapur Express
3. Charlapalli–Bhubaneswar New Express
4. Charlapalli – Thiruvananthapuram North Amrit Bharat Express
5. Gorakhpur–Charlapalli Express

No trains from Tiruchanur

== Notes ==
a. Runs one day in a week with both directions.
