= Nagercoil–Charlapalli Amrit Bharat Express =

Amrit Bharat Express train route in India

Nagercoil – Charlapalli Amrit Bharat Express

Overview
- Service type: Amrit Bharat Express, Superfast
- Status: Active
- Locale: Tamil Nadu and Telangana
- First service: 11 March 2026; 6 months ago (Inaugural); 12 March 2026; 6 months ago
- Current operator: Southern Railways (SR)

Route
- Termini: Nagercoil Junction (NCJ); Charlapalli (CHZ)
- Stops: 30
- Distance travelled: 1,412 km (877 mi)
- Average journey time: 28 hrs 30 mins
- Service frequency: Weekly
- Train number: 16357/16358
- Line used: (TBC)

On-board services
- Class: Sleeper Class Coach (SL) General Unreserved Coach (GS)
- Seating arrangements: Yes
- Sleeping arrangements: Yes
- Auto-rack arrangements: Upper
- Catering facilities: On-board Catering
- Observation facilities: Saffron-Grey
- Entertainment facilities: Electric Outlets; Reading lights; Bottle Holder
- Other facilities: CCTV cameras; Bio-Vacuum Toilets; Foot-Operated Water Taps; Passenger information system

Technical
- Rolling stock: Modified LHB Coaches
- Track gauge: Indian gauge 1,676 mm (5 ft 6 in) broad gauge
- Electrification: 25 kV 50 Hz AC Overhead line
- Operating speed: 50 km/h (31 mph) (Avg.)
- Track owner: Indian Railways
- Rake maintenance: Nagercoil Jn (NCJ)
- Rake sharing: Nagercoil Junction–Mangaluru Junction Amrit Bharat Express
Route map
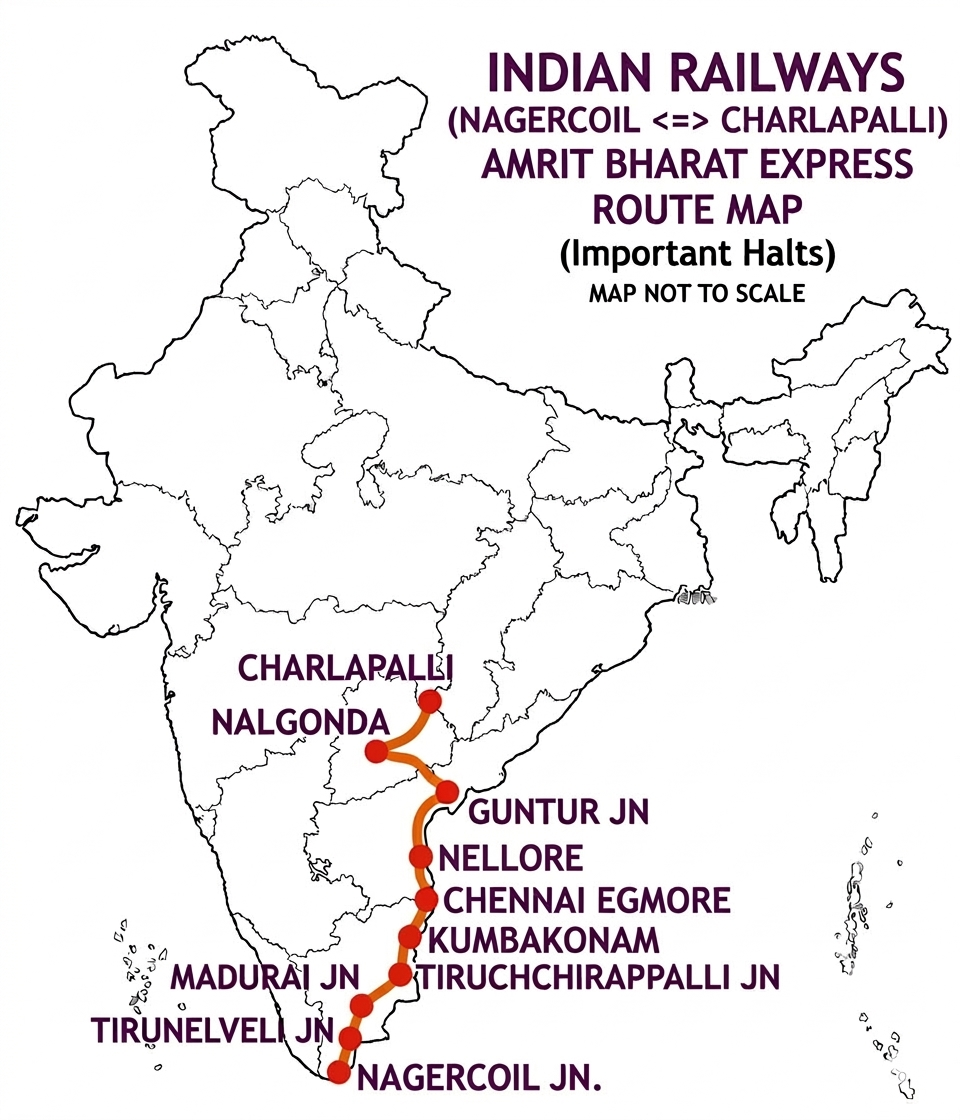
↓ 16358 • 16357 ↑

The 16357/16358 Nagercoil–Charlapalli Amrit Bharat Express is India's 29th Non-AC Superfast Amrit Bharat Express train, which will run across the states of Tamil Nadu and Telangana by connecting the Nagas city of Nagercoil to the south central capital city of Telangana, Hyderabad.

The express train was inaugurated on 11 March 2026 by Honorable Prime Minister Narendra Modi through video conference.

== Overview ==
The train is currently operated by Indian Railways, connecting Nagercoil Jn and Charlapalli. It is currently operated with train numbers 16357/16358 on weekly basis.

== Rakes ==
It is the 27th Amrit Bharat 2.0 Express train in which the locomotives were designed by Chittaranjan Locomotive Works (CLW) at Chittaranjan, West Bengal and the coaches were designed and manufactured by the Integral Coach Factory at Perambur, Chennai under the Make in India Initiative.

== Schedule ==
Train Schedule: Nagercoil ↔ Charlapalli Amrit Bharat Express
Train no.	Station code	Departure station	Departure time	Departure day	Arrival station	Arrival time	Arrival hours
16357	NCJ	Nagercoil Junction	11:45 PM	daily	Charlapalli	04:20 AM	28h 30m
16358	CHZ	Charlapalli	08:15 AM	daily	Nagercoil Junction	03:35 PM	31h 20m

== Routes & halts ==
The commercial halts for this 16357/16358 Nagercoil – Charlapalli Amrit Bharat Express are as follows:-

1. Nagercoil Junction
2. Valliyur
3. Tirunelveli Junction
4. Kovilpatti
5. Satur
6. Virudhunagar Junction
7. Madurai Junction
8. Dindigul Junction
9. Tiruchchirappalli Junction
10. Thanjavur Junction
11. Papanasam
12. Kumbakonam
13. Mayiladuthurai Junction
14. Sirkazhi
15. Chidambaram
16. Tirupadripulyur
17. Viluppuram Junction
18. Chengalpattu Junction
19. Tambaram
20. Chennai Egmore
21. Sullurupeta
22. Nayadupeta
23. Nellore
24. Ongole
25. Chirala
26. Bapatla
27. Tenali Junction
28. Guntur Junction
29. Sattenapalle
30. Miryalaguda
31. Nalgonda
32. Charlapalli

== See also ==
- Amrit Bharat Express
- Vande Bharat Express
- Rajdhani Express
- Nagercoil Junction–Mangaluru Junction Amrit Bharat Express
- Nagercoil Junction railway station
- Charlapalli railway station
