= Charlapalli–Shalimar Amrit Bharat Express =

Amrit Bharat Express train route in India

Overview
- Service type: Amrit Bharat Express, Superfast
- Status: Active
- Locale: Telangana, Andhra Pradesh, Odisha and West Bengal
- First service: 7 April 2026; 4 months ago
- Current operator: South Central Railways (SCR)

Route
- Termini: Charlapalli (CHZ); Shalimar (SHM)
- Stops: 24
- Distance travelled: 1,546 km (961 mi)
- Average journey time: 28 hrs 5 mins
- Service frequency: Weekly
- Train number: 17065/17066
- Lines used: Kazipet–Warangal–Khammam line; Eluru–Rajahmundry–Samalkot line; Duvvada–Vizianagaram line; Srikakulam Road–Brahmapur–Khurda Road line; Bhubaneswar–Kharagpur line towards →(Jajpur Keonjhar Road), (Cuttack Junction), (Bhadrak), (Balasore); Santragachi–Shalimar line

On-board services
- Class: Sleeper class coach (SL) General unreserved coach (GS)
- Seating arrangements: Yes
- Sleeping arrangements: Yes
- Auto-rack arrangements: Upper
- Catering facilities: No
- Observation facilities: Saffron-grey
- Entertainment facilities: Electric outlets; Reading lights; Bottle holder
- Other facilities: CCTV cameras; Bio-vacuum toilets; Foot-operated water taps; Passenger information system

Technical
- Rolling stock: Modified LHB coaches
- Track gauge: Indian gauge
- Electrification: 25 kV 50 Hz AC overhead line
- Operating speed: 55 km (34 mi) (Avg.)
- Track owner: Indian Railways
- Rake maintenance: Charlapalli (CHZ)
- Rake sharing: No
Route map
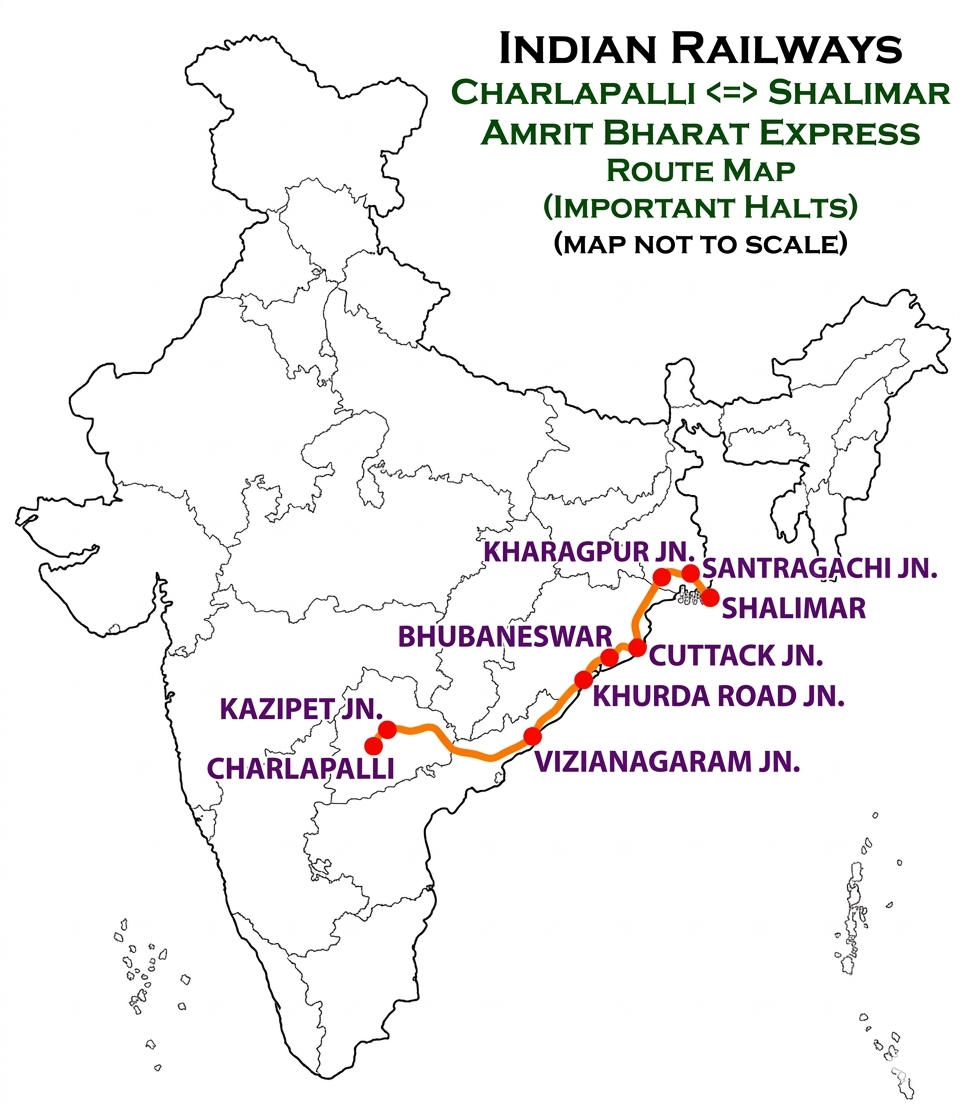

The 17065/17066 Charlapalli–Shalimar Amrit Bharat Express is India's 31st Non-AC Superfast Amrit Bharat Express train, which runs across the states of Telangana, Andhra Pradesh, Odisha and West Bengal by connecting the eastern corridor of Hyderabad to the national rail network Charlapalli with Shalimar, the major terminal in Howrah.

The express train will inaugurated on 2026 by Honorable Prime Minister Narendra Modi through video conference.

== Overview ==
The train is operated by Indian Railways, connecting Charlapalli and Shalimar. It is currently operated 17065/17066 on weekly basis.

== Rakes ==
It is the 31st Amrit Bharat 2.0 Express train in which the locomotives were designed by Chittaranjan Locomotive Works (CLW) at Chittaranjan, West Bengal and the coaches were designed and manufactured by the Integral Coach Factory at Perambur, Chennai under the Make in India Initiative.

== Schedule ==
Train Schedule: Charlapalli ↔ Shalimar Amrit Bharat Express
Train No.	Station Code	Departure Station	Departure Time	Departure Day	Arrival Station	Arrival Hours
17065	CHZ	Charlapalli	07:15 AM	Shalimar	11:20 AM	28h 5m
17066	SHM	Shalimar	12:50 PM	Charlapalli	07:00 PM	30h 10m

== Routes and halts ==
The important halts of the train are :

- Charlapalli
- Kazipet Junction
- Warangal
- Mahbubabad
- Khammam
- Rayanapadu
- Eluru
- Rajahmundry
- Samalkot Junction
- Tuni
- Duvvada
- Vizianagaram Junction
- Srikakulam Road
- Palasa
- Brahmapur
- Khurda Road Junction
- Bhubaneswar
- Cuttack Junction
- Jajpur Keonjhar Road
- Bhadrak
- Balasore
- Kharagpur Junction
- Santragachi Junction
- Shalimar

== Rake reversal or rake share ==
No rake reversal or rake share.

== See also ==
- Amrit Bharat Express
- Vande Bharat Express
- Vande Bharat Sleeper Express
- Rajdhani Express
- Mahamana Express

== Notes ==
a. Runs a day in a week with both directions.
