= Chennai–Charlapalli Superfast Express =

Train in India

MGR Chennai Central-Charlapalli Superfast Express
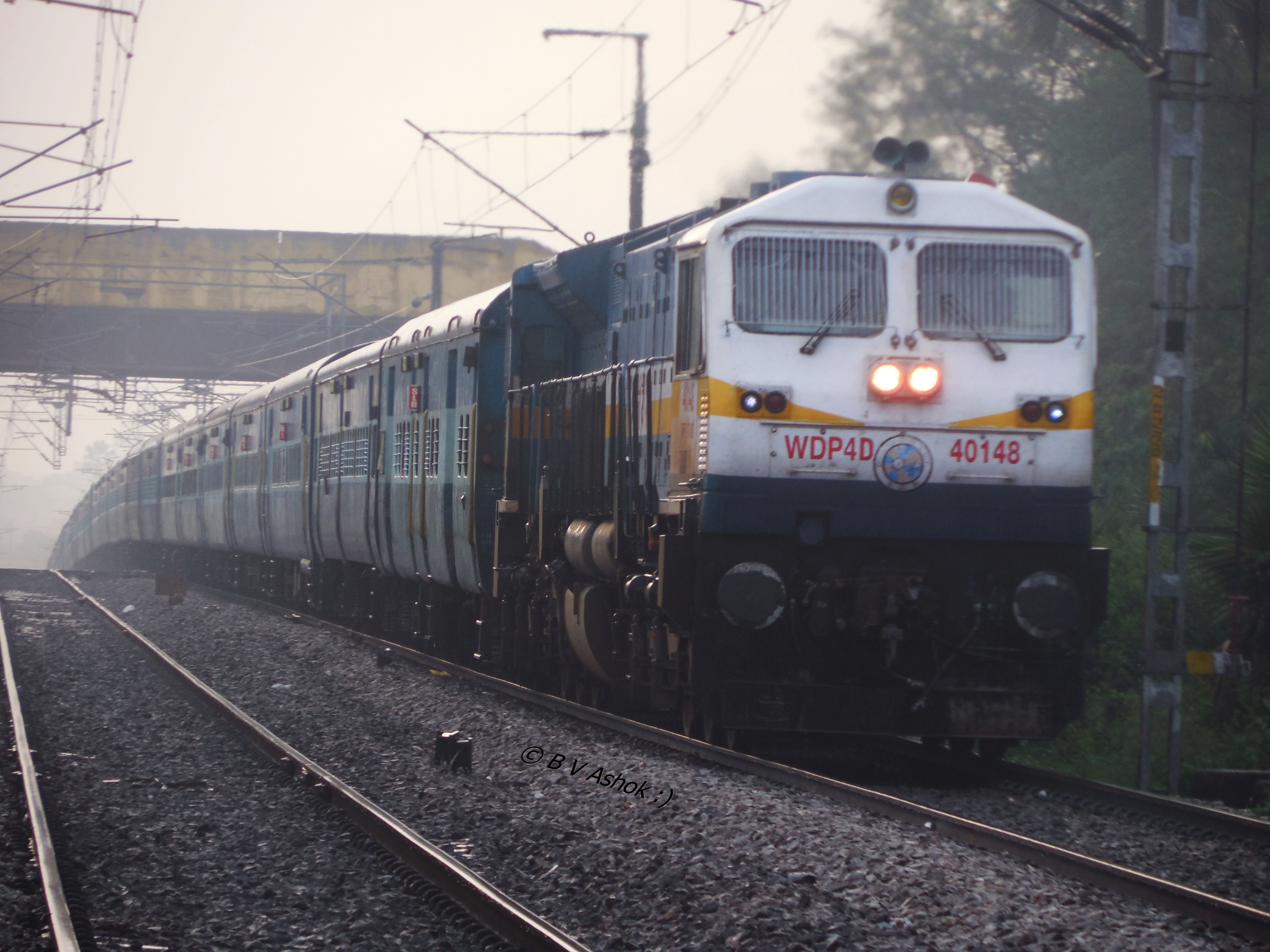
- Chennai Hyderabad Superfast near Moula Ali in 2014

Overview
- Service type: Superfast Express
- Locale: Tamil Nadu, Andhra Pradesh & Telangana
- First service: 1 April 1965; 61 years ago
- Current operator: Southern Railway

Route
- Termini: MGR Chennai Central (MAS); Charlapalli (CHZ)
- Stops: 19
- Distance travelled: 694 km (431 mi)
- Average journey time: 12 hours
- Service frequency: Daily
- Train number: 12603 / 12604

On-board services
- Classes: AC First Class, AC 2 Tier, AC 3 Tier, Sleeper Class, General Unreserved
- Seating arrangements: Yes
- Sleeping arrangements: Yes
- Catering facilities: On-board catering E-catering
- Observation facilities: Large windows
- Baggage facilities: No
- Other facilities: Below the seats

Technical
- Rolling stock: LHB coach
- Track gauge: 1,676 mm (5 ft 6 in)
- Operating speed: 56 km/h (35 mph) average including halts.

The 12603 / 12604 MGR Chennai Central-Charlapalli Superfast Express is a Superfast Express in India which runs between Chennai Central and Charlapalli. It was introduced on 1 April 1965 between Chennai Central and Hyderabad. This train is named after the Hyderabad city. From 2025 The train terminal shifted from Hyderabad to Charlapalli and being operated as Chennai Charlapalli SF express. The Southern Railway (SR) of the Indian Railways administers this train & the train shares its rakes with 22649/22650 Yercaud Express. The old numbers of this train were 7053/54, when the train was under South Central Railway.

== Numbering ==
Train number 12603 runs from Chennai Central to Charlapalli while 12604 runs from Charlapalli to Chennai Central

== Route ==
The 12603 leaves Chennai Central at 16:45 hours and reaches Charlapalli at 05:10 hours the following day. Similarly the 12604 starts from Charlapalli at 17:25 hours and reaches Chennai Central at 05:40 hours the following day. The train runs via Sullurpeta, Naidupeta, Gudur, Nellore, Kavali, Singarayakonda, Ongole, Chirala, Bapatla, Nidubrolu, Tenali, Guntur, Sattenapalle, Piduguralla, Nadikudi Jn, Miryalaguda and Nallagonda

== Loco ==
The train is generally hauled by WAP-4 or WAP 7 from Hyderabad to Chennai Central.

== Classes ==
The 23-coach composition contains– 1 AC First Class, 2 Two-tier AC, 3 Three-tier AC, 10 Sleeper class, 4 General, 2 SLR

== See also ==
- Andhra Pradesh Express
- Visakhapatnam Swarna Jayanti Express
- Padmavati Express
- Rudrama Devi
- Bahubali
