= Muzaffarpur–Charlapalli Amrit Bharat Express =

Amrit Bharat Express train route in India

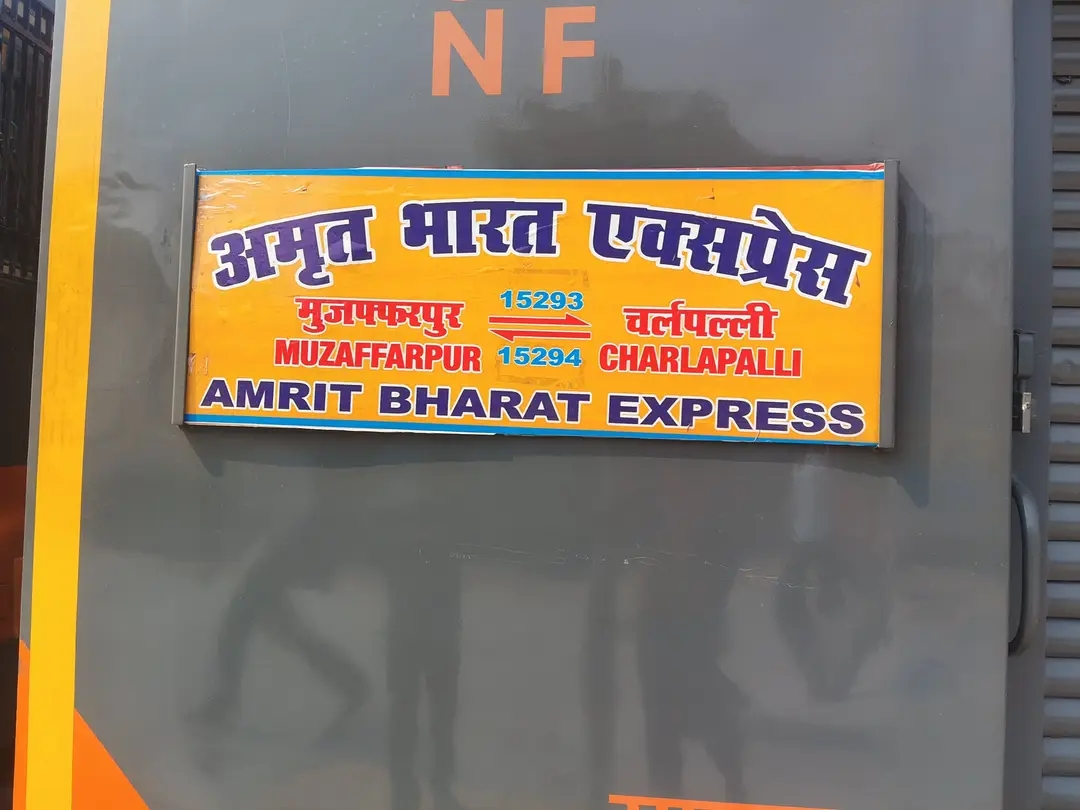
- Train Board

Overview
- Service type: Amrit Bharat Express, Superfast
- Status: Active
- Locale: Bihar, Uttar Pradesh, Madhya Pradesh, Maharashtra & Telangana
- First service: 29 September 2025; 12 months ago (Inaugural) 14 October 2025; 12 months ago (Commercial)
- Current operator: East Central Railways (ECR)

Route
- Termini: Muzaffarpur Junction (MFP); Charlapalli (CHZ)
- Stops: 23
- Distance travelled: 1,889 km (1,174 mi)
- Average journey time: 37h 10m
- Service frequency: Weekly
- Train number: 15293 / 15294
- Lines used: Muzaffarpur–Hajipur section; Patliputra–Ara line; Pt. Deen Dayal Upadhyaya–Prayagraj Chheoki–Jabalpur line; Jabalpur–Itarsi line; Nagpur–Kazipet–Charlapalli line

On-board services
- Class: Sleeper class (SL) General Unreserved (GS)
- Seating arrangements: Yes
- Sleeping arrangements: Yes
- Auto-rack arrangements: Upper
- Catering facilities: Pantry car & on-board catering
- Observation facilities: Saffron-grey
- Entertainment facilities: Electric outlets; Reading lights; Bottle holder
- Other facilities: CCTV cameras; Bio-vacuum toilets; Foot-operated water taps; Passenger information system

Technical
- Rolling stock: Modified LHB coach
- Track gauge: Indian gauge
- Electrification: 25 kV 50 Hz AC Overhead line
- Operating speed: 51 km (32 mi) (Avg.)
- Track owner: Indian Railways
- Rake maintenance: MFP CDO
- Rake sharing: No

The 15293/15294 Muzaffarpur–Charlapalli Amrit Bharat Express is India's 15th Non-AC Superfast Amrit Bharat Express train, which runs across the states of Bihar, Uttar Pradesh, Madhya Pradesh, Maharashtra & Telangana connecting Muzaffarpur Junction in Muzaffarpur and Charlapalli in Hyderabad.

== Overview ==
- The train was originally introduced in 2023 as a weekly special service with a mixed coach composition consisting of AC 2-tier, AC 3-tier, AC 3E (economy), sleeper class, and general unreserved coaches to cater to the festive rush. However, shortly after its introduction, the train gained popularity due to the lack of a direct train connection between Muzaffarpur (MFP) and Secunderabad, increasing demand for regular service.
- After operating for nearly two years as a ToD special train, it was included in the Railway Time Table (TAG) 2025. In October 2025, the Indian Railways announced that the service would be upgraded to the Amrit Bharat Express. Accordingly, on 26 October 2025, the special train numbered 05293/05294, which had mixed coach composition, was converted to Amrit Bharat Express coaches and assigned a new permanent train number: 155293/155294.
- In TAG 2026 15293 Spped Up by 45 Minutes and 15294 Speed up By 60 Minutes

== Schedule ==
15293 / 15294 Amrit Bharat Express Schedule
Train Type	Amrit Bharat Express
Distance	1889 km
Average speed	~52 km/h
Journey time (MFP→CHZ)	36 hrs 25 min
Journey time (CHZ→MFP)	35 hrs 55 min
Classes available	SL, PC
Unreserved classes	GEN, PWD
Operating days	MFP→CHZ: Tuesday; CHZ→MFP: Thursday
Operator	ECR – East Central Railway

== Routes & halts ==
The halts for this 15293/15294 Muzaffarpur–Charlapalli Amrit Bharat Express are as follows:-

1. Muzaffarpur Junction
2. Hajipur Junction
3. Sonpur Junction
4. Patliputra Junction
5. Danapur
6. Ara Junction
7. Buxar
8. Pandit Deen Dayal Upadhyaya Junction
9. Prayagraj Chheoki Junction
10. Satna Junction
11. Katni Junction
12. Jabalpur Junction
13. Narsinghpur
14. Pipariya
15. Itarsi Junction
16. Nagpur Junction
17. Balharshah
18. Sirpur Kaghaznagar
19. Bellampalli
20. Ramagundam
21. Peddapalli Junction
22. Kazipet Junction
23. Charlapalli

== Coach composition ==
Coach Composition
Category	Coaches	Total
SLRD (Divyangjan Coach)	SLRD, SLRD	2
General Unreserved (GEN)	GEN1, GEN2, GEN3, GEN4, GEN5, GEN6, GEN7	7
Sleeper class (SL)	S8, S7, S6, S5, S4, S3, S2, S1	8
Pantry car (PC)	PC	1
General Unreserved (GEN)	GEN8, GEN9, GEN10, GEN11, GEN12	5
SLRD (Divyangjan Coach)	SLRD	1
Total Coaches		22

- Primary Maintenance – Muzaffarpur Coaching Depot

== Rakes ==
It is the 15th Amrit Bharat 2.0 Express train in which the locomotives were designed by Chittaranjan Locomotive Works (CLW) at Chittaranjan, West Bengal and the coaches were designed and manufactured by the Integral Coach Factory at Perambur, Chennai under the Make in India initiative.

== See also ==
- Amrit Bharat Express
- Vande Bharat Express
- Tejas Express
- Muzaffarpur Junction railway station
- Charlapalli railway station
- Sapt Kranti Express
