= Charlapalli–Narasapur Express =

Train in India

Charlapalli - Narasapur Express

Overview
- Service type: Express
- Status: Active
- Locale: Telangana and Andhra Pradesh
- First service: 2 May 2026; 3 months ago
- Current operator: South Central Railway (SCR)

Route
- Termini: Charlapalli (CHZ); Narasapur (NS)
- Stops: 9
- Distance travelled: 439 km (273 mi)
- Average journey time: 11h 10m
- Service frequency: Weekly
- Train number: 17061 / 17062

On-board services
- Classes: General Unreserved, Sleeper Class, AC 3rd Class, AC 2nd Class
- Seating arrangements: Yes
- Sleeping arrangements: Yes
- Catering facilities: Pantry Car
- Observation facilities: Large windows
- Baggage facilities: No
- Other facilities: Below the seats

Technical
- Rolling stock: LHB coach
- Track gauge: 1,676 mm (5 ft 6 in)
- Electrification: 25 kV 50 Hz AC Overhead line
- Operating speed: 130 km/h (81 mph) maximum, 39 km/h (24 mph) average including halts.
- Track owner: Indian Railways
Route map
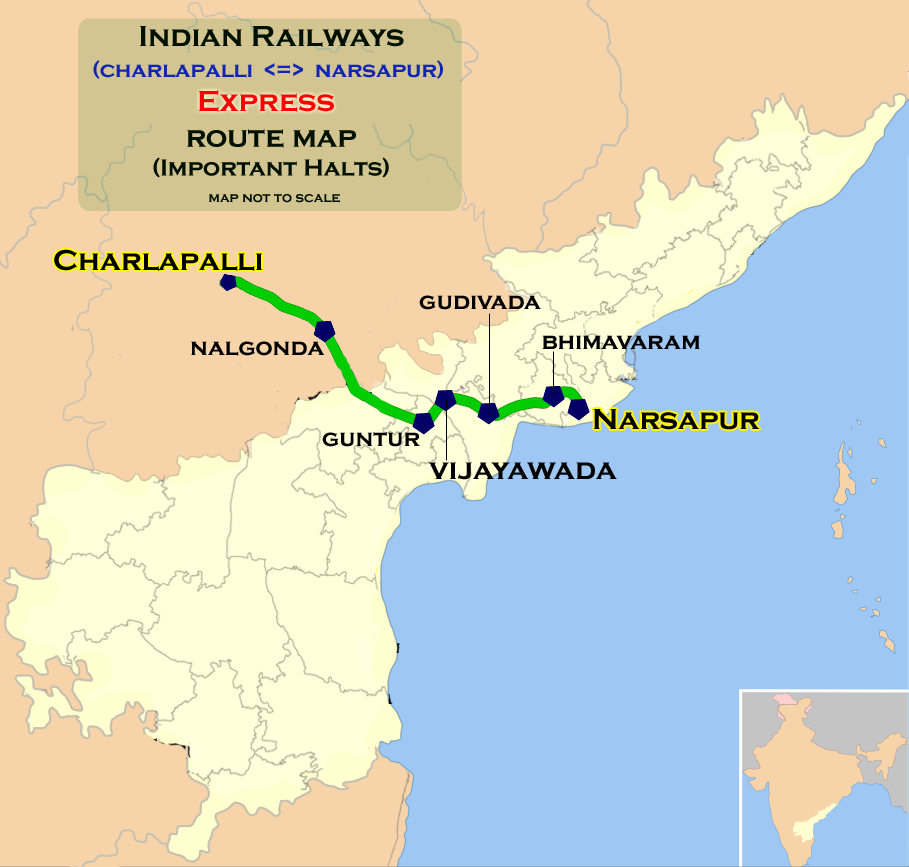

The 17061 / 17062 Charlapalli–Narasapur Express is an express train belonging to South Coast Railway zone that runs between the city Charlapalli of Telangana and Narasapur of Andhra Pradesh in India.

It operates as train number 17061 from Charlapalli to Narasapur and as train number 17062 in the reverse direction, serving the states of Andhra Pradesh and Telangana.

== Services ==
• 17061/ Charlapalli–Narasapur Express has an average speed of 39 km/h and covers 439 km in 11h 10m.

• 17062/ Narasapur–Charlapalli Express has an average speed of 37 km/h and covers 439 km in 11h 50m.

== Route and halts ==
The important halts of the train are :

- Charlapalli
- Nalgonda
- Guntur Junction
- Vijayawada Junction
- Gudivada Junction
- Kaikaluru
- Akividu
- Bhimavaram Town Halt
- Veeravasaram
- Palakollu
- Narasapur

== Schedule ==
• 17061 – 7:50 pm (Saturday) [Charlapalli]

• 17062 – 8:00 pm (Sunday) [Narasapur]

== Coach composition ==
1. General Unreserved – 4
2. Sleeper Class – 7
3. AC 3rd Class – 7
4. AC 2nd Class – 2
5. Generator break van - 1
6. luggage cum break van - 1

== Traction ==
As the entire route is fully electrified, it is hauled by a Royapuram Shed-based WAP-7 electric locomotive from Charlapalli to Narasapur and vice versa.

== Rake reversal or rake share ==
The train has Rake Sharing with Seven Hills Express, Karimnagar TPTY Express & Charlapalli Darbhanga & Hyderabad Raxaul Exp.

== See also ==
Trains from Charlapalli :

1. Charlapalli – Thiruvananthapuram North Amrit Bharat Express
2. Visakhapatnam–Charlapalli Express
3. Gorakhpur–Charlapalli Express
4. Kamakhya–Charlapalli Amrit Bharat Express
5. East Coast Express

Trains from Narasapur :

1. Narasapur–Hyderabad Express
2. MGR Chennai Central–Narasapur Vande Bharat Express
3. Narasapur–Nagarsol Express (via Guntur)
4. Narasapur–Nidadavolu Express
5. Narasapur–Nagarsol Express (via Warangal)

== Notes ==
a. Runs one day in a week with both directions.
