= Khammam railway station =

Railway station in Telangana, India

Khammam ఖమ్మం
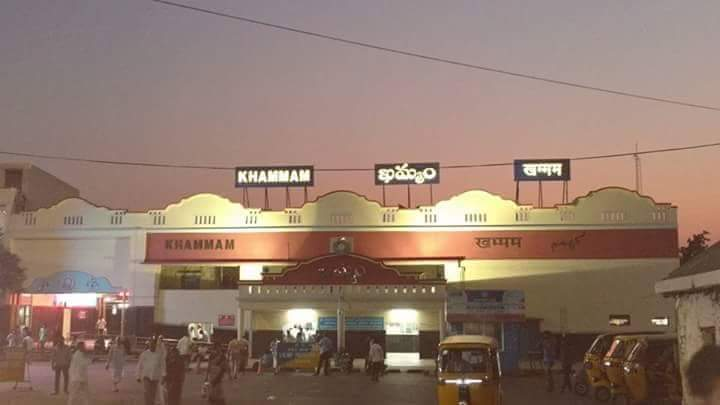

General information
- Location: Near Anand Bhavan, Khammam – 507001 Telangana; India
- Coordinates: 17.249347°N 80.138491°E
- Owner: Indian Railways
- Operator: Indian Railways
- Line: Kazipet–Vijayawada section
- Platforms: 2
- Tracks: 4

Construction
- Parking: Available (Paid)
- Accessible: Disabled access

Other information
- Status: Active
- Station code: KMT
- Zone(s): SCR
- Division(s): Secunderabad
- Classification: NSG-3

Services
Preceding station	Indian Railways	Following station
Mallemadugu towards ?	Khammam Kazipet Jn – Vijayawada Jn.	Pandellaopalli towards ?
Location
- Location within Telangana Location within India
- Interactive map

Khammam railway station (station code:KMT) is a third grade non-suburban (NSG–3) category Indian railway station in Secunderabad railway division of South Central Railway zone. It is located in Khammam of the Indian state of Telangana. It was selected as one of the 21 stations to be developed under Amrit Bharat Stations scheme.

Khammam railway station was declared second cleanest in the 'A' category stations. Khammam railway station is one of the biggest and busiest railway stations in the south central railway system. The station has two platforms serving five tracks, one of which serves goods only. Khammam railway station is part of the Visakhapatnam - Secunderabad Vande Bharat Express connecting Hyderabad to Visakhapatnam in 8 hours and 30 minutes.
