= Charlapalli railway station =

Railway station in Hyderabad, India

Coordinates: 17.4577°N 78.6062°E

Charlapalli railway station Charlapalli, Hyderabad
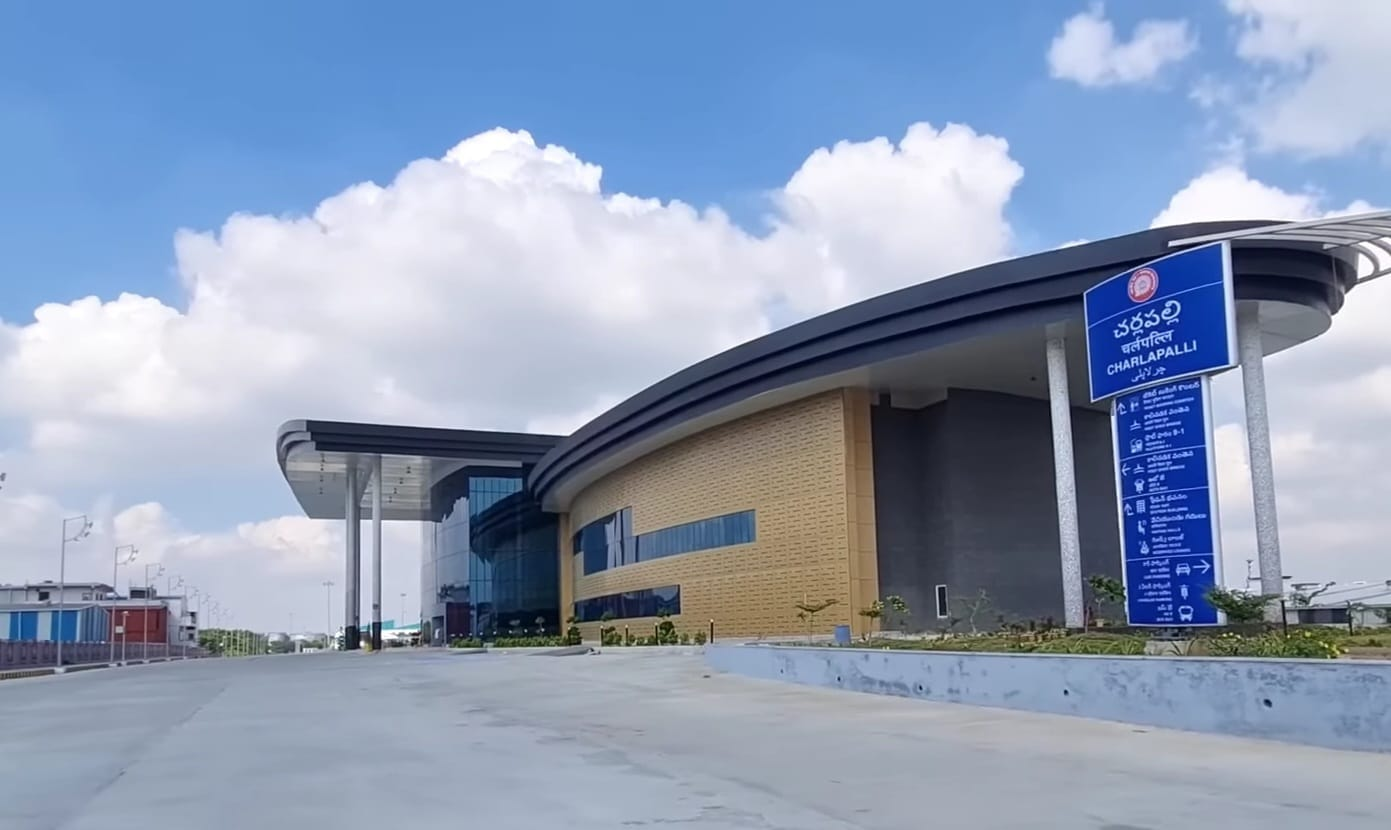
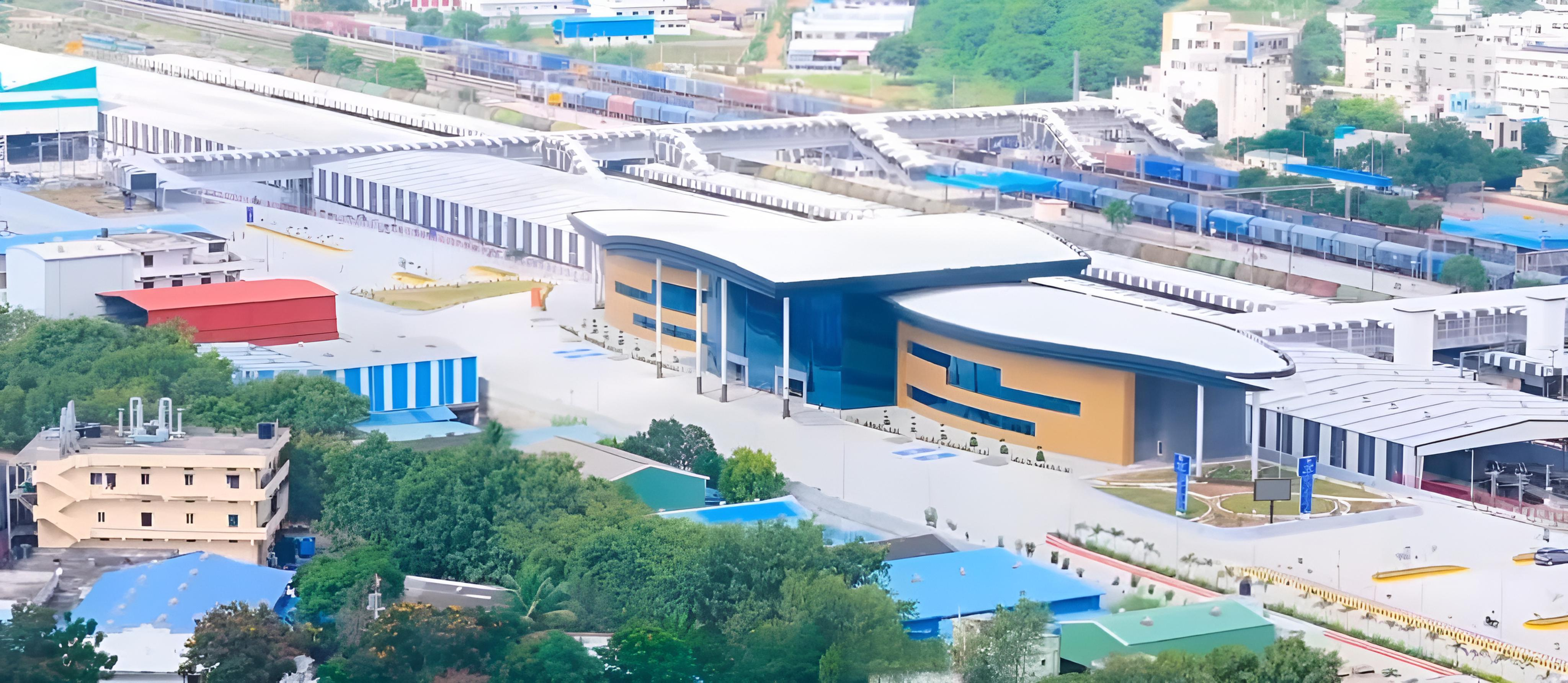
- Charlapalli railway station.

General information
- Location: Cherlapally, Telangana; India
- Elevation: 525 m (1,722 ft)
- System: Indian Railways and Hyderabad MMTS station
- Owner: Indian Railways
- Operator: South Central Railways
- Line: Secunderabad–Nagpur section Wadi–Vijayawada section (Main Line) Secunderabad–Guntur section
- Platforms: 9
- Tracks: 19
- Connections: Auto stand, Taxi stand, TGSRTC, MMTS

Construction
- Structure type: Standard on ground
- Parking: Yes
- Accessible: Available

Other information
- Status: Functional
- Station code: CHZ
- Zone(s): South Central Railway zone
- Division(s): Secunderabad

History
- Rebuilt: 2024; 2 years ago
- Electrified: 1993; 33 years ago
Location

Charlapalli railway station (station code: CHZ) is the fifth major Railway Terminal developed in Hyderabad City after Nampally, Secunderabad Jn, Kacheguda and Lingampally. It is the second biggest railway station in terms of platforms after Secunderabad Jn in the entire South Central Railways zone. It has been redeveloped to facilitate future needs and to create wider connectivity to other cities and parts of the country. It is currently operated by the South Central Railway zone of Indian Railways. The station was mainly developed to reduce the load on the other three major terminals, which are saturated with heavy movement of trains and passengers.

== Development ==
The foundation stone for the development of Charlapalli Satellite Terminal was laid on 18 February 2020 at a cost of ₹430 crores. Prime Minister Narendra Modi inaugurated Charlapalli railway station on 6 January 2025. The station has VIP lounges, food courts, escalators and air conditioning waiting rooms. According to railway officials, it is the second air-conditioned railway terminal in South India. It is also one of the greenfield projects for Indian Railways to construct a world-class terminal. This is the first railway station in the South Central Railway zone developed as a world-class futuristic railway station and the second in South India after Sir M. Visvesvaraya Terminal, Bengaluru.

== Incidents ==
On 3 May 2025 the roof of the railway station collapsed. The reasons for collapsed of the roofs of the terminal which was inaugurated only four months ago in January 2025 is currently being investigated. It is reported that prior to the collapse of the roof, 2.5 cm of rain with wind speeds of 15 kmph were reported.

== Connectivity ==
This railway station will be connected to nearby neighborhoods in the city through the Hyderabad Multi-Modal Transport System (MMTS) and TGSRTC city buses. Ride-hailing services for car taxis, bike taxis and autorickshaws, such as Ola, Rapido, and Uber, are also available.

== Originating express trains ==
Train No.	Train Name	Destination	Departure	Running	Route
15293/94	Charlapalli- Muzaffarpur Amrit Bharat Express	Muzaffarpur	04:05	Thu	Kazipet Jn, Nagpur Jn, Jabalpur, Prayagraj Chhoeki Jn, PT DD Upadhyay Jn,Patliputra Jn, Danapur Jn
12604/03	Charlapalli-MGR Chennai Central SF Express	MGR Chennai Central	17:25	Runs Daily	Miryalaguda, Guntur Jn, Ongole, Nellore, MGR Chennai Central.
18046/45	Charlapalli-Shalimar East Coast Express	Shalimar	08:40	Runs Daily	Kazipet Jn, Khammam, Vijayawada Jn, Visakhapatnam Jn, Bhubaneswar, Kharagapur Jn.
12590/89	Charlapalli-Gorakhpur SF Express	Gorakhpur Jn	21:45	Fri	Kazipet Jn, Balharshah, Nagpur Jn, Bhopal Jn, VGL Jhansi Jn, Kanpur Central
18527/28	Charlapalli-Visakhapatnam Weekly Express	Visakhapatnam	14:30	Sat	Kazipet Jn, Khammam, Rayanapadu, Rajahmundry, Anakapalle, Duvvada.
17007/08	Charlapalli-Darbhanga Express	Darbhanga	22:50	Tue, Sat	Kazipet Jn, Balharshah, Raipur Jn, Rourkela Jn, Barauni Jn.
12735/36	Charlapalli-Yesvantpur Garib Rath Express	Yesvantpur Jn	19:45	Sun, Wed, Fri	Secunderabad Jn, Lingampalli, Raichur Jn, Dharmavaram Jn, Hindupur.
17041/42	Charlapalli – Thiruvananthapuram North Amrit Bharat Express	Tiruvananthapuram North	07:45	Tue	Guntur Jn, Gudur Jn, Tiruttani, Coimbatore Jn, Kottayam, Kollam Jn
16358/57	Charlapalli-Nagarcoil Amrit Bharat Express	Nargarcoil	08:15	Sat	Guntur Jn, Chennai Egmore, Mayiladuthurai Jn, Tanjavur Jn, Madurai Jn, Tirunelveli Jn.
17065/66	Charlapalli-Shalimar Amrit Bharat Express	Shalimar	06:55	Tue	Kazipet Jn, Khammam, Eluru, Duvvada, Bhubaneswar, Kharagpur Jn.
15673/74	Charlapalli-Kamakhya Amrit Bharat Express	Kamakhya	19:40	Wed	Guntur Jn, Bhimavaram Town, Duvvada, Bhubaneswar, Dumkuni Jn, Malda Town.
22075/76	Charlapalli-Gorakhpur Amrit Bharat Express	Gorakhpur Jn	21:45	Fri	Kazipet Jn, Balharshah, Nagpur Jn, Bhopal Jn, VGL Jhansi Jn, Kanpur Central
15645/46	Charlapalli-Silchar Weekly Express	Silchar	16:50	Sat	Guntur Jn, Visakhapatnam Jn, Khurda Road Jn, Bhubaneswar, Kharagpur Jn, New Jalpaiguri Jn, Guwahati.
17031/32	Charlapalli-Agartala Weekly Express	Agartala	16:20	Mon	Guntur Jn, Visakhapatnam Jn, Khurda Road Jn, Bhubaneswar, Kharagpur Jn, New Jalpaiguri Jn, Guwahati.
17045/46	Charlapalli-Anakapalle Weekly Express	Anakapalle	20:05	Sat	Kazipet Jn, Khammam, Rayanapadu, Eluru, Samalkot Jn, Annavaram, Tuni.
17053/54	Charlapalli-Anakapalle Weekly Express	Anakapalle	22:10	Thu	Nalgonda, Guntur Jn, Vijayawada Jn, Eluru, Samalkot Jn, Annavaram, Tuni.
17441/42; 17443/44	Charlapalli-Tirupati Express	Tirupati	21:20	Tue(17441/42); Thu(17443/44)	Nalgonda, Markapur Road, Cumbum, Nandyal Jn, Prodduturu, Kadapa, Renigunta Jn.
17061/62	Charlapalli–Narasapur Weekly Express	Narsapur	19:50	Sat	Nalgonda, Guntur Jn, Vijayawada Jn, Gudivada Jn, Bhimavaram Town, Palakollu.
17067/78	Charlapalli-Bhubaneswar North weekly Express	Bhubaneswar North	18:10	Mon	Guntur Jn, Vijayawada Jn Bhimavaram Town, Duvvada, Vizianagaram Jn, Khurdha Road, Bhubaneswar.
17047/48	Charlapalli–Tiruchanur Express (via Vijayawada)	Tiruchanur	18:55	Wed	Warangal, Khammam, Vijayawada Jn, Ongole, Nellore, Gudur Jn, Renigunta.
17059/60	Charlapalli-Tiruchanur Weekly Express(Via- Kurnool)	Tiruchanur	21:15	Sun	Malkajgiri Jn, Kacheguda, Mahbubnagar, Kurnool City, Gooty Jn, Kadapa Jn, Renigunta Jn.
17075/76	Charlapalli-Belagavi Weekly Express	Belagavi	16:00	Sat	Secunderabad Jn, Vikarabad Jn, Raichur Jn, Guntakal Jn, Ballari Jn, S.S.S.Hubli Jn.
20915/16	Charlapalli-Indore Weekly Humsafar Express	Indore Junction	20:45	Sun	Secunderabad, Lingampalli, Vikarabad Jn, Kalaburagi Jn, Pune Jn, Vadodara Jn, Ujjain Jn.
20157/58	Charlapalli-Rewa Weekly Superfast Express	Rewa	17:00	Mon	Kazipet Jn, Mancherial, Balharshah, Nagpur Jn, Amla Jn, Itarsi Jn, Bina Jn, Satna Jn
