= Nagpur–Secunderabad line =

Indian railway line

Overview
- Status: Operational
- Owner: Indian Railways
- Locale: Maharashtra and Telangana
- Termini: Nagpur; Secunderabad

Service
- Operator(s): Central Railway, South Central Railway
- Depot(s): Ajni, Kazipet, Moula Ali, Hyderabad
- Rolling stock: WAP-7, WAG-7 locos, WAG-9, WAG-9I, WDG-4, WDM-3A, WDG-3A, and WDM-2.

History
- Opened: 1929; 97 years ago

Technical
- Track length: Mainline: 581 km (361 mi); Branch line: Majri-Mudkhed 266 km (165 mi); Nizamabad–Peddapalli section
- Number of tracks: 2
- Track gauge: 5 ft 6 in (1,676 mm) broad gauge
- Electrification: 1988–91
- Operating speed: up to 130 km/h

The Nagpur–Secunderabad line is a railway line connecting Nagpur and Secunderabad. A major portion of this 581-kilometre-long (361 mi) track, from Nagpur to Kazipet, is part of the Delhi–Chennai line. It is also part of the Delhi–Hyderabad line. The line is under the jurisdiction of Central Railway and South-Central Railway.

== History ==
With the completion of the Kazipet–Ballarshah link in 1929, Chennai was directly linked to Delhi.

The Wadi–Secunderabad line was built in 1874 with financing by the Nizam of Hyderabad. It later became part of Nizam's Guaranteed State Railway. In 1889, the main line of the Nizam's Guaranteed State Railway was extended to Vijayawada, then known as Bezwada.

As of 1909, "From Wadi on the Great Indian Peninsula Railway, the Nizam's Guaranteed State Railway runs east to Warangal and then south-east towards Bezwada on the East Coast section of the Madras Railway."

== Electrification ==
The Kazipet–Ramagundam sector was electrified in 1987–88, the Ramagundam–Balharshah–Nagpur sector in 1988–89, the Kazipet–Secunderabad sector in 1991–93 and Majri–Rajpur sector in 1994–95.

== Speed limits ==
The Delhi–Chennai Central line (Grand Trunk route) is classified as a "Group A" line which can take speeds up to 160 km/h.

The Wadi–Secunderabad–Kazipet line is classified as "Group B" line and can take speeds up to 130 km/h.

== Passenger movement ==
Railway stations on this line, namely Nagpur and Secunderabad, are amongst the top hundred booking stations of Indian Railway.

== Sheds and workshops ==
Ajni has an electric loco shed and a diesel trip shed. It is primarily a freight shed with around 190 locos. It houses WAG-7, WAG-9, WAG-9I, and WAP-7 locos. Kazipet diesel loco shed houses WAG-9 and WDG-4 locos. Opened in 2006, Kazipet electric loco shed houses 150+ WAG-7 locos. Maula Ali has a shed for diesel locomotives and EMUs. It houses WDM-2, WDM-3A, WDG-3A, DHMUs (3-car and 6-car) and EMUs. Hyderabad has an electric trip shed.

Nagpur has a coach maintenance workshop. Ajni has goods wagon repair facility. There is a routine overhaul depot for wagon maintenance at Ramagundam and coaching maintenance depots at Secunderabad, Hyderabad and Kazipet.
