= Kazipet Junction railway station =

Railway station in Telangana, India

Kazipet Junction
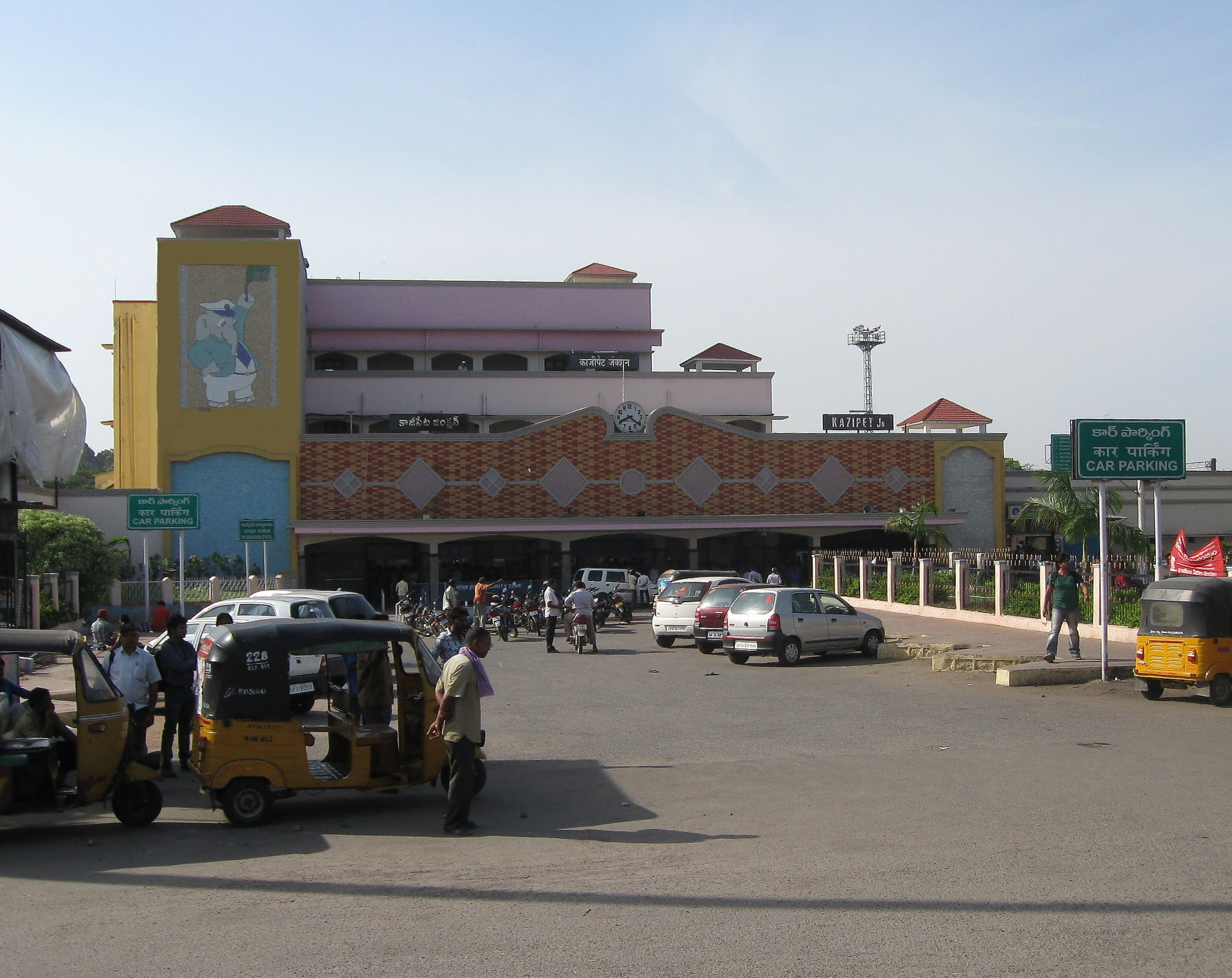
- Main entrance of Kazipet railway station

General information
- Location: Main Road, Kazipet, Hanamkonda district, Telangana; India
- Coordinates: 17°58′26″N 79°30′40″E
- Elevation: 292 metres (958 ft)
- System: Indian Railways station
- Owner: Indian Railways
- Operator: South Central Railways
- Lines: Kazipet–Secunderabad section, Kazipet–Vijayawada section, Kazipet–Nagpur section
- Platforms: 3
- Tracks: 6

Construction
- Structure type: Standard on ground
- Parking: Yes
- Cycle facilities: No
- Accessible: Available

Other information
- Status: Functioning
- Station code: KZJ
- Zone(s): South Central Railway zone
- Division(s): Secunderabad

History
- Opened: Between 1874 and 1889
Location
- Location within Telangana Location within India

Kazipet Junction railway station (station code: KZJ) is a third grade non-suburban (NSG–3) category Indian railway station in Secunderabad railway division of South Central Railway zone. It is located in Hanamkonda district and serves the city of Kazipet and Warangal in the Indian state of Telangana. It was selected as one of the 21 stations to be developed under Amrit Bharat Stations scheme.

== History ==
With the completion of the Kazipet–Balharshah link in 1929, Chennai was directly linked to Delhi.

The Wadi–Secunderabad line was built in 1874 with financing by the Nizam of Hyderabad. It later became part of Nizam's Guaranteed State Railway. In 1889, the main line of the Nizam's Guaranteed State Railway was extended to Vijayawada, then known as Bezwada.

As of 1909, "From Wadi on the Great Indian Peninsula Railway, the Nizam's Guaranteed State Railway runs east to Warangal and then south-east towards Bezwada on the East Coast section of the Madras Railway."

== Electrification ==
The Dornakal–Kazipet sector was electrified in 1988–89, the Kazipet–Ramagundam sector in 1987–88 and the Kazipet–Secunderabad sector in 1991–93.

== Amenities ==
Kazipet railway station has computerized reservation counters, retiring room, waiting room, vegetarian and non-vegetarian refreshments and book stall.

== Economy ==
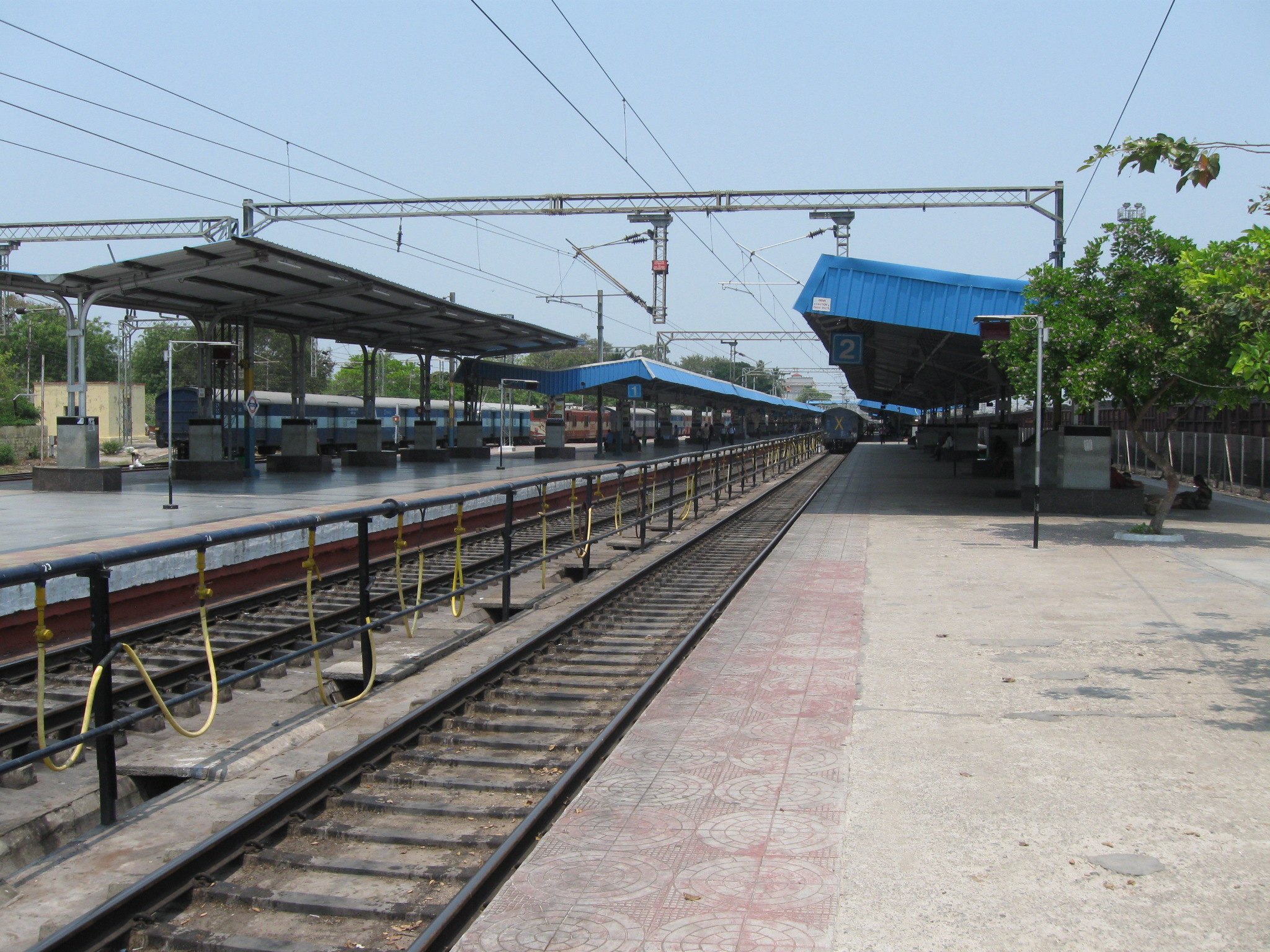
Platforms 1 and 2

Coal freight from Singareni, Kothagudem, Ramagundam, Bellampalli and Balharshah mines account for around 40 per cent of the goods traffic handled by the railways in the Kazipet–Balharshah sector.

== Developments ==
A new 201.04 kilometres (124.92 mi) railway line has been approved by the Cabinet Committee on Economic Affairs between Balharshah Junction and Kazipet. The new line will be passing through Warangal, Ramagundam, Mancherial and Asifabad districts in Telangana, and through Chandrapur in Maharashtra. This will facilitate both the passenger traffic and goods movement that include cement, coal and food.

In October 2023, the Hadapsar-Hyderabad Express was extended to Kazipet.

== Diesel Loco Shed, Kazipet ==
Kazipet Diesel Loco Shed houses WAG-7 and WDG-4 locos. It was opened in 2006

Serial No.	Locomotive Class	Horsepower	Quantity
1.	WAG-7	5350	160
2.	WDG-4/4D	4000/4500	76
3.	WDP-4/4D	4000/4500	5
Total Locomotives Active as of April 2026			241

Preceding station	Indian Railways	Following station
Terminus	South Central Railway zone Kazipet–Ramagundam–Balharshah section	Hasanparthi Road towards ?
Terminus	South Central Railway zone Kazipet–Dornakal–Vijayawada section	Warangal towards ?
Terminus	South Central Railway zone Kazipet–Secunderabad section	Pindial towards ?
