= Anakapalle railway station =

Railway station in Andhra Pradesh, India

Anakapalle

General information
- Location: Laxmi Devi Peta, Anakapalle, Anakapalli district, Andhra Pradesh; India
- Coordinates: 17°41′42″N 83°00′30″E
- Elevation: 31 feet (9.4 m)
- System: Indian Railways station
- Owner: Indian Railways
- Operator: South Coast Railway zone
- Line: Visakhapatnam–Vijayawada of Howrah–Chennai main line and
- Platforms: 3 (4th platform is going on construction)
- Tracks: 5 broad gauge 1,676 mm (5 ft 6 in)

Construction
- Structure type: Standard (on-ground station)
- Parking: Available

Other information
- Status: Functioning
- Station code: AKP
- Zone(s): South Coast Railway zone
- Division(s): Vijayawada

Passengers
- 24,500 per day
Location
- Location within Andhra Pradesh Location within India
- Interactive map

Anakapalle railway station (Station CODE: AKP) is a railway station in Anakapalle, a neighbourhood of Visakhapatnam city, Anakapalli district in Andhra Pradesh. It lies on the Vijayawada–Chennai section and is administered under Vijayawada railway division of South Coast Railway zone (formerly South Central Railway zone). It is one of the busiest railway station in north Andhra. Garib Rath, Double Decker, Antyodhaya Expresses stop at this station. Anakapalle is the main station after the Visakhapatnam Junction.

== Classification ==
In terms of earnings and outward passengers handled, Anakapalle is categorized as a Non-Suburban Grade-4 (NSG-4) railway station. Based on the re–categorization of Indian Railway stations for the period of 2017–18 and 2022–23, an NSG–4 category station earns between ₹10–₹20 crore and handles 2–5 million passengers.

== Structure and amenities ==
The station has roof top solar panels installed by the Indian railways, along with various railway stations and service buildings in the country, as a part of sourcing 500 MW solar energy. It is one of the 38 stations in the division to be equipped with Automatic Ticket Vending Machines (ATVMs).

Preceding station	Indian Railways	Following station
Thadi towards ?	South Coast Railway zone Visakhapatnam–Vijayawada of Howrah–Chennai main line	Kasimkota towards ?
