= Warangal railway station =

Railway station in Telangana, India

Warangal
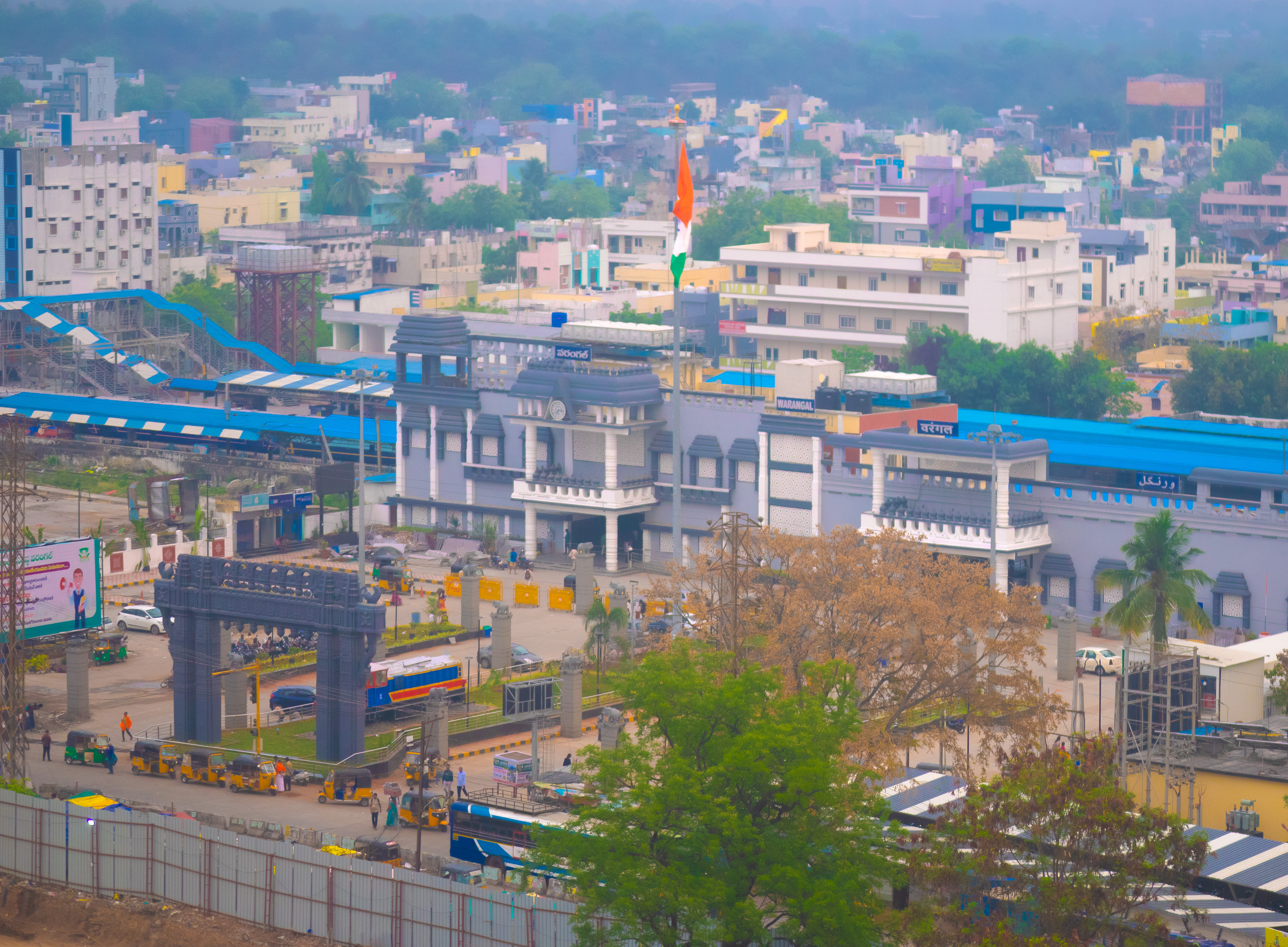
- Warangal railway station

General information
- Location: Station Road, Warangal, Enquiry No. 0870-2426232, Telangana; India
- Coordinates: 17°58′24″N 79°36′27″E
- Elevation: 271 metres (889 ft)
- System: Indian Railways Station
- Owner: Indian Railways
- Operator: South Central Railways
- Lines: Vijayawada–Kazipet line Delhi–Chennai line
- Platforms: 4
- Tracks: 5

Construction
- Structure type: Standard (on-ground station)
- Parking: Yes
- Cycle facilities: Yes
- Accessible: Available

Other information
- Status: Functioning
- Station code: WL
- Zone(s): South Central Railway zone
- Division(s): Secunderabad
- Classification: NSG-3

History
- Former names: Orugallu
Location
- Location within Telangana Location within India

Warangal Railway station (station code: WL) is a third grade non-suburban (NSG–3) category Indian railway station in Secunderabad railway division of South Central Railway zone. It serves the city of Warangal in the Indian state of Telangana. It was selected as one of the 21 stations to be developed under Amrit Bharat Stations scheme.

== Facilities ==
As part of the Station Redevelopment Project, Indian Railways has upgraded the Warangal Railway station with many passenger-friendly facilities. The eastern side of the railway station resembles Kakatiya architecture. The general waiting hall, ladies' waiting hall, as well as the upper-class waiting hall present on the east side of the station have been modernized and widened as part of the redevelopment project.

=== Renovations ===
Renovation on the western side of the station is still in progress. There is provision for a spacious concourse, one general waiting hall, one upper-class waiting hall, and one 'pay and use' toilet. Other facilities are also being planned. Provision is being made for disabled (Divyang) passengers in the form of separate toilets, ramps at entrances, etc. The circulation area on the western side of the station is being widened and provided with a separate entry and exit. The additional area will have the capacity to park 100 two-wheelers and 24 four-wheelers. This facility will ensure quick drop-offs and pickups for travelers using vehicles.

Walls in the concourse area and on platform No. 1 were decorated with local art, such as Cheriyal paintings. Stone flooring on platform No. 1 was replaced with granite flooring. Additionally, the seating capacity on the platform was expanded. Air condition and modern furniture were added to one of two waiting rooms. A second deluxe retiring room has been kept spacious for the comfort of passengers.

The boarding facility was extended to platform 4. The bays increased from four to sixteen including a new cover. New rainwater harvesting pits tap rainwater for water conservation. Trees were planted in the available space. Windows were equipped with sun reflective glasses, which reduce direct sun exposure in the rooms and prevent overheating. Also, all platforms have been equipped with new LED signage boards and all light fixtures were equipped with LEDs to minimize energy consumption.

It has been selected as part of Amrit Bharat Station Scheme.

== See also ==
- South Central Railway
- Secunderabad railway division

| Preceding station | Indian Railways | Following station |
|---|---|---|
| Kazipet F Cabin towards ? | South Central Railway zone Kazipet–Vijayawada section of Delhi–Chennai line | Vanchangiri towards ? |
