= Miryalaguda railway station =

Railway station in Nalgonda district, Telangana, India

Miryalaguda

General information
- Location: Miryalaguda, Nalgonda district, Telangana; India
- Coordinates: 16°51′36″N 79°32′02″E
- Elevation: 152 m (499 ft)
- System: Express train and Passenger train Station
- Owner: Indian Railways
- Operator: South Coast Railway zone
- Line: Nadikudi-Pagidipalli section
- Platforms: 3
- Tracks: 4

Construction
- Structure type: Standard
- Parking: Available

Other information
- Status: Functioning
- Station code: MRGA
- Zone(s): South Coast Railway zone
- Division(s): Guntur

History
- Opened: 1989; 37 years ago
- Electrified: 2019
Location
- Location within Telangana Location within India

Miryalaguda railway station (station code: MRGA) is a fifth grade non-suburban (NSG–5) category Indian railway station in Guntur railway division of South Central Railway zone. It is located in Nalgonda district of the Indian state of Telangana. It was selected as one of the 21 stations to be developed under Amrit Bharat Stations scheme.

== History ==
Miryalaguda Railway station was opened in 1989, after the completion of Nadikudi-Pagidipalli section.

== Passenger amenities ==
It is one of the stations in the division to be equipped with Automatic Ticket Vending Machines (ATVM's).

== New lines ==
A new railway line is being constructed from Vishnupuram to Janpahad–Mellacheruvu–Motumarri, where it will join the Kazipet–Vijayawada mail line. This route will reduce the distance from Miryalaguda to Vijayawada by 40 km when compared to existing route through Guntur.

== Freight ==
It serves the FCI godown and Paradigm Logistics.
