= Kamakhya–Charlapalli Amrit Bharat Express =

Amrit Bharat Express train route in India

Overview
- Service type: Amrit Bharat Express, Superfast Express
- Status: Active
- Locale: Assam, West Bengal, Bihar, Odisha, Andhra Pradesh and Telangana
- First service: 13 March 2026; 43 days ago
- Current operator: Northeast Frontier Railways (NFR)

Route
- Termini: Kamakhya Junction (KYQ); Charlapalli (CHZ)
- Stops: 43
- Distance travelled: 2,472 km (1,536 mi)
- Average journey time: 50 hrs 20 mins
- Service frequency: Weekly
- Train number: 15673 / 15674
- Lines used: New Bongaigaon–Guwahati line; New Jalpaiguri–New Bongaigaon line; Barsoi–Kishanganj–New Jalpaiguri line; Dankuni–Rampurhat line; Cuttack–Kharagpur line; Visakhapatnam–Brahmapur–Khurda Road line; Vijayawada–Duvvada line; Kazipet–Vijayawada line

On-board services
- Class: Sleeper class coach (SL) General unreserved coach (GS)
- Seating arrangements: Yes
- Sleeping arrangements: Yes
- Catering facilities: On-board catering
- Observation facilities: Saffron-grey livery
- Entertainment facilities: On-board WiFi; Infotainment system; Electric outlets; Reading light; Seat pockets; Bottle holder; Tray table
- Baggage facilities: Overhead racks
- Other facilities: Kavach

Technical
- Rolling stock: Modern LHB coaches
- Track gauge: Indian gauge
- Electrification: 25 kV 50 Hz AC overhead line
- Operating speed: 55 km/h (34 mph) (Avg.)
- Track owner: Indian Railways
- Rake maintenance: Primary – Kamakhya Junction (KYQ); Secondary – Charlapalli (CHZ)
Route map
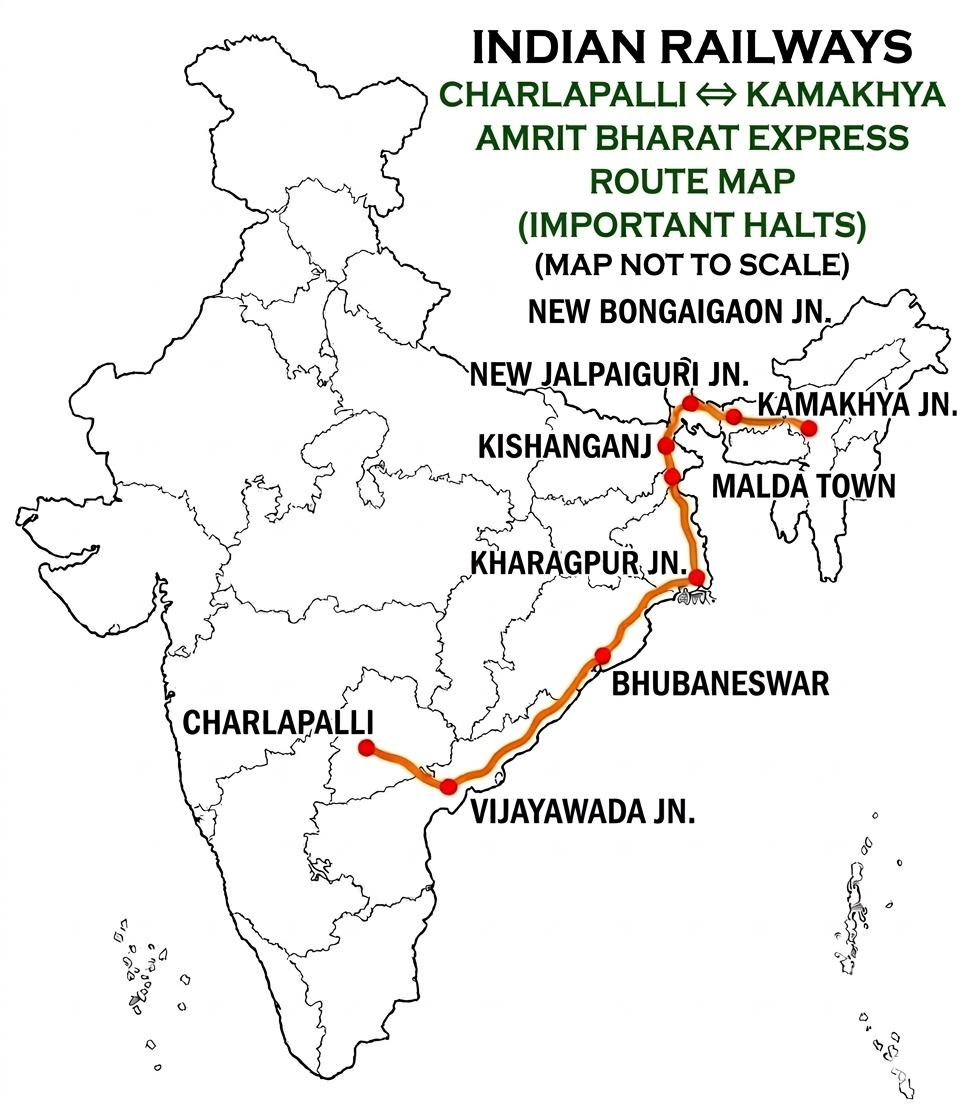

The 15673/15674 Kamakhya–Charlapalli Amrit Bharat Express is India's 30th non-AC Superfast Amrit Bharat Express train, which runs across the states of Assam, West Bengal, Bihar, Odisha, Andhra Pradesh and Telangana by connecting the Gateway of Northeast India, Guwahati, Assam with City of Pearls Hyderabad, Telangana in India.

This express train will inaugurated on 2026 by Honorable Prime Minister Narendra Modi through video conference.

== Overview ==
This train is operated by Indian Railways' Northeast Frontier Railway zone, connecting Kamakhya Junction and Charlapalli. It is currently operated 15673/15674 on weekly basis.

== Rakes ==
It is the 30th Amrit Bharat 2.0 Express train in which the locomotives were designed by Chittaranjan Locomotive Works (CLW) at Chittaranjan, West Bengal and the coaches were designed and manufactured by the Integral Coach Factory at Perambur, Chennai under the Make in India Initiative.

== Schedule ==
Train schedule: Kamakhya ↔ Charlapalli Amrit Bharat Express
Train no.	Station code	Departure station	Departure time	Departure day	Arrival station	Arrival hours
15674	KYQ	Kamakhya Junction	7:00 PM	Charlapalli	02:40 PM	43h 40m
15673	CHZ	Charlapalli	07:40 PM	Kamakhya Junction	10:00 PM	50h 20m

== Routes and halts ==
The important halts of Kamakhya–Charlapalli Amrit Bharat Express are as follows:

- Kamakhya Junction
- Chaygaon
- Dudhnoi
- Goalpara
- Abhayapuri
- New Bongaigaon Junction
- Kokrajhar
- Gossaigaon Hat
- New Alipurduar
- New Cooch Behar
- Jalpaiguri Road
- New Jalpaiguri Junction
- Aluabari Road Junction
- Kishanganj
- Barsoi Junction
- Malda Town
- Rampurhat Junction
- Bolpur Shantiniketan
- Dankuni Junction
- Andul
- Kharagpur Junction
- Balasore
- Bhadrak
- Jajpur Keonjhar Road
- Cuttack Junction
- Bhubaneswar
- Khurda Road Junction
- Balugaon
- Brahmapur
- Palasa
- Srikakulam Road
- Vizianagaram Junction
- Pendurthi
- Duvvada
- Samalkot Junction
- Rajahmundry
- Tanuku
- Bhimavaram Town
- Gudivada
- Vijayawada Junction
- Guntur Junction
- Nalgonda
- Charlapalli

== Rake reversal or rake share ==
No rake reversal or rake share.

== Coach composition ==
Coach Composition
Category	Coaches	Total
SLRD (Divyangjan coach)	SLRD, SLRD	2
General unreserved (GEN)	GEN1, GEN2, GEN3, GEN4, GEN5, GEN6, GEN7	7
Sleeper class (SL)	S8, S7, S6, S5, S4, S3, S2, S1	8
Pantry car (PC)	PC	1
General (uGEN)	GEN8, GEN9, GEN10, GEN11, GEN12	5
SLRD (Divyangjan coach)	SLRD	1
Total coaches		22

== See also ==
- Amrit Bharat Express
- Vande Bharat Express
- Tejas Express
- Charlapalli railway station
- Kamakhya Junction railway station

== Notes ==
a. Runs a day in a week with both directions.
