= Nalgonda railway station =

Railway station in Telangana, India

Nalgonda

General information
- Location: Panagal Road, Nalgonda, Nalgonda district, Telangana; India
- Coordinates: 17°20′24″N 79°09′57″E
- Elevation: 224 m (735 ft)
- System: Indian Railways station
- Owner: Indian Railways
- Operator: South Coast Railway
- Lines: Nadikudi-Pagidipalli section Motumarri-Vishnupuram; Pagidipalli–Nallapadu section-
- Platforms: 2
- Tracks: 3

Construction
- Structure type: Standard
- Parking: Available

Other information
- Status: Functioning
- Station code: NLDA
- Zone(s): South Coast Railway
- Division(s): Guntur Railway Division

History
- Opened: 1989
- Electrified: Yes (2019)
Location
- Location within Telangana Location within India

The Nalgonda railway station (station code: NLDA) is a third grade non-suburban (NSG–5) category Indian railway station in Guntur railway division of South Central Railway zone. It serves the city of Nalgonda in the Indian state of Telangana. It was selected as one of the 21 stations to be developed under Amrit Bharat Stations scheme.

== History ==
A 152 km long Nadikudi-Pagidipalli section foundation stone laid by then Prime Minister Indira Gandhi on 7 April 1974. The Nadikudi-Pagidipalli section was opened for traffic in three phases on 1987, November 1988, April 1989. During this time the Nalgonda railway station was opened. This line was completed by Indian Railways.

== Station amenities ==
It is one of the stations in the division to be equipped with Automatic Ticket Vending Machines (ATVM's).

== New lines ==
A new railway line from Vishnupuram to Janpahad–Mellacheruvu–Motumarri was completed in 2019, it joined the Kazipet–Vijayawada main line. This route reduces the distance from Nalgonda to Vijayawada by 40 km when compared to the old route through Guntur.
