= Charlapalli – Thiruvananthapuram North Amrit Bharat Express =

Amrit Bharat Express train route in India

Charlapalli–Thiruvananthapuram North Amrit Bharat Express
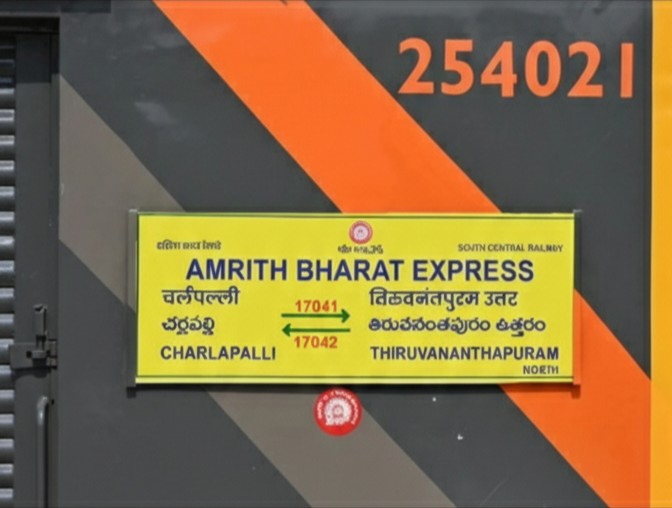
- Train board

Overview
- Service type: Amrit Bharat Express, Superfast
- Status: Active
- Locale: Telangana, Andhra Pradesh, Tamil Nadu and Kerala
- First service: 23 January 2026; 3 months ago (Inaugural); 27 January 2026; 2 months ago (Commercial)
- Current operator: South Central Railways (SCR)

Route
- Termini: Charlapalli (CHZ); Thiruvananthapuram North (TVCN)
- Stops: 31
- Distance travelled: 1,488 km (925 mi)
- Average journey time: 31 hrs 30 mins
- Service frequency: Weekly
- Train number: 17041/17042
- Lines used: Charlapalli–Guntur line towards → Nalgonda Hyderabad; Guntur–Tenali line towards → Renigunta Junction; Renigunta–Katpadi line; Jolarpettai–Shoranur line; Shornur-Ernakulam line towards → Kottayam; Ernakulam–Kollam line (via Kottayam and Kayamkulam); Kollam–Thiruvananthapuram North line

On-board services
- Class: Sleeper class coach (SL) General unreserved coach (GS)
- Seating arrangements: Yes
- Sleeping arrangements: Yes
- Auto-rack arrangements: Upper
- Catering facilities: On-board catering
- Observation facilities: Saffron-grey
- Entertainment facilities: Electric outlets; Reading lights; Bottle holder
- Other facilities: CCTV cameras; Bio-vacuum toilets; Foot-operated water taps; Passenger information system

Technical
- Rolling stock: Modified LHB coaches
- Track gauge: Indian gauge
- Electrification: 25 kV 50 Hz AC overhead line
- Operating speed: 47 km (29 mi) (Avg.)
- Track owner: Indian Railways
- Rake sharing: No

The 17041/17042 Charlapalli–Thiruvananthapuram North Amrit Bharat Express is India's 27th non-AC Superfast Amrit Bharat Express train, which runs across the states of Telangana, Andhra Pradesh, Tamil Nadu and Kerala by connecting the eastern corridor of Hyderabad to the national rail network Charlapalli with Thiruvananthapuram North, the capital of Kerala to major cities across the country of central city hub in India.

The express train is inaugurated on 23 January 2026 by Honorable Prime Minister Narendra Modi through video conference.

== Overview ==
The train is operated by Indian Railways, connecting Charlapalli and Thiruvananthapuram North. It is currently operated 17041/17042 on weekly basis.

== Rakes ==
It is the 27th Amrit Bharat 2.0 Express train in which the locomotives were designed by Chittaranjan Locomotive Works (CLW) at Chittaranjan, West Bengal and the coaches were designed and manufactured by the Rail Coach Factory at Kapurthala, under the Make in India initiative.

== Schedule ==
Train Schedule: Charlapalli ↔ Thiruvananthapuram North Amrit Bharat Express
Train no.	Station code	Departure station	Departure time	Departure day	Arrival station	Arrival hours
17041	CHZ	Charlapalli	7:15 AM	Thiruvananthapuram North	2:45 PM	31h 30m
17042	TVCN	Thiruvananthapuram North	7:30 PM	Charlapalli	10:30 PM	29h 0m

== Routes and halts ==
The 17041/17042 Charlapalli–Thiruvananthapuram North Amrit Bharat Express halts are as follows:

1. Charlapalli
2. Nalgonda
3. Miryalaguda
4. Sattenapalle
5. Guntur Junction
6. Tenali Junction
7. Bapatla
8. Ongole
9. Nellore
10. Renigunta Junction
11. Tiruttani
12. Katpadi Junction
13. Jolarpettai Junction
14. Salem Junction
15. Erode Junction
16. Tiruppur
17. Coimbatore Junction
18. Palakkad Junction
19. Thrissur
20. Aluva
21. Ernakulam Town
22. Kottayam
23. Changanasseri
24. Tiruvalla
25. Chengannur
26. Mavelikara
27. Kayamkulam Junction
28. Karunagappalli
29. Kollam Junction
30. Varkala Sivagiri
31. Thiruvananthapuram North

== Rake reversal ==
No rake reversal or rake share.

== See also ==
- Amrit Bharat Express
- Vande Bharat Express
- Rajdhani Express
- Charlapalli
- Thiruvananthapuram North

== Notes ==
a. Runs a day in a week with both directions.
