= Gorakhpur–Charlapalli Express =

Train in India

Charlapalli–Gorakhpur Express
Overview
- Service type: Superfast
- First service: 2 January 1991; 35 years ago
- Current operator: North Eastern Railway

Route
- Termini: Charlapalli (CHZ); Gorakhpur (GKP)
- Stops: 42
- Distance travelled: 1,818 km (1,130 mi)
- Average journey time: 32 hours 17 minutes
- Service frequency: Weekly
- Train number: 12590 / 12589

On-board services
- Classes: AC First, AC 2 Tier, AC 3 Tier, Sleeper Class, General Unreserved
- Seating arrangements: Yes
- Sleeping arrangements: Yes
- Catering facilities: Available
- Observation facilities: Large Window
- Baggage facilities: No
- Other facilities: Below the seats

Technical
- Rolling stock: LHB coach
- Track gauge: 1,676 mm (5 ft 6 in)
- Operating speed: 55 km/h (34 mph) average including halts.
Route map
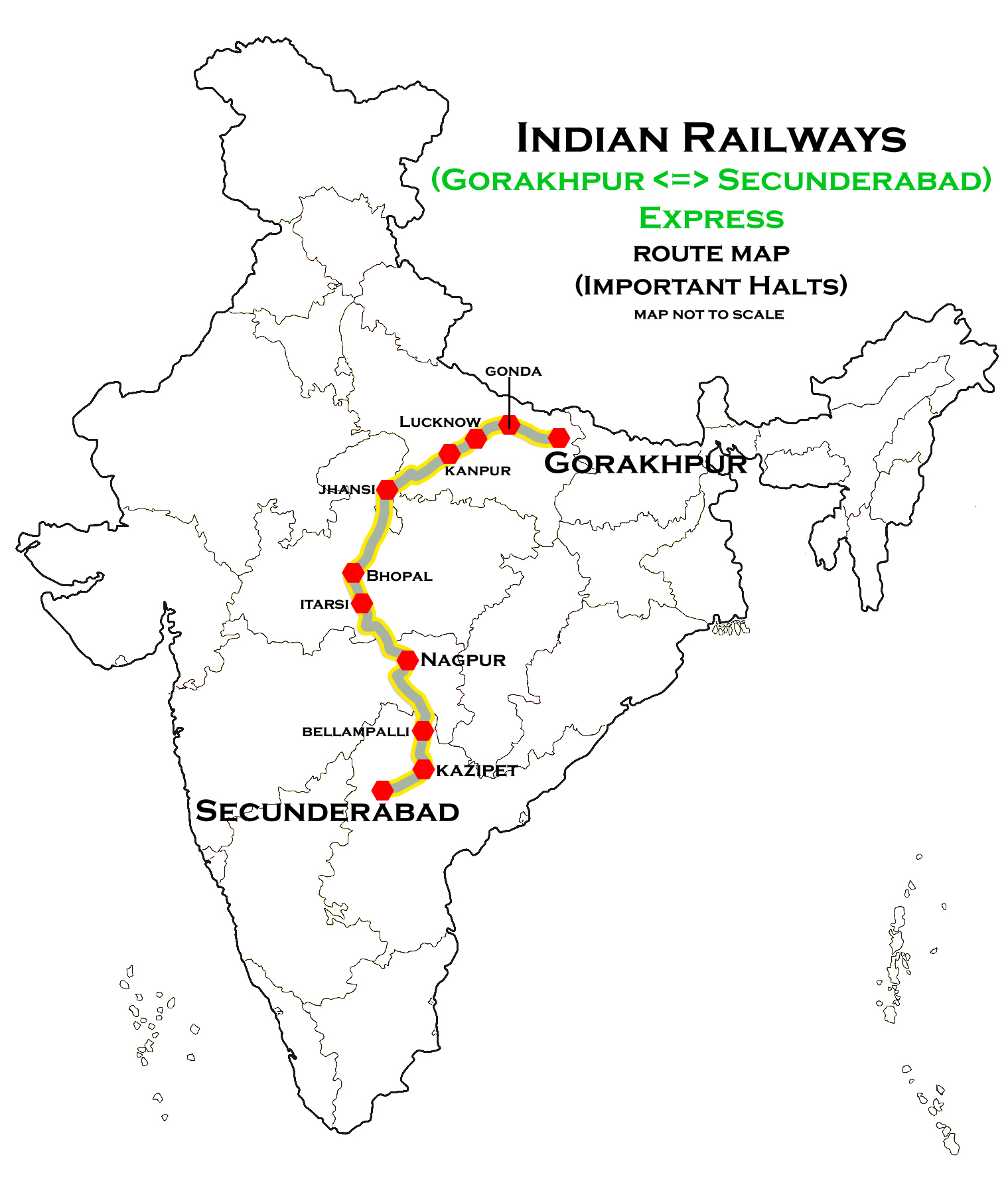

The 12589 / 12590 Charlapalli–Gorakhpur Express is a superfast express train belonging to Indian Railways North Eastern Railway zone that runs between Charlaplli and Gorakhpur Junction in India. It was inaugurated as 5090/5089 Gorakhpur - Hyderabad Express(now 12590/12589 Secunderabad - Gorakhpur - Secunderabad) with Bi-weekly services departing Secunderabad on Sunday and Thursday. Later, one day run of 5090/89 was extended to Bangalore(Bengaluru) as 5092/5091(now 12592/12591 Yesvantpur - Gorakhpur - Yesvantpur Express). The train numbers swapped after the trains were upgraded to SuperFast status in early 2000's.

It is expected to operate as train number 12590 from Charlapalli to Gorakhpur Junction and as train number 12589 in the reverse direction, serving the states of Telangana, Maharashtra, Madhya Pradesh & Uttar Pradesh.

Earlier till 2024 the train used to be operated between Gorakhpur Secunderabad after the development of Charlapalli Railway terminal the train terminal is changed to Charlapalli and now being operated as Gorakhpur Charlapalli express

== Coaches ==
The 12590 / 89 Express has one First AC, 2 AC 2-tier, 8 AC 3-tier, 4 sleeper class, four general unreserved & two SLR (seating with luggage rake) coaches and one high capacity parcel van coaches. It also has a pantry car.

As is customary with most train services in India, coach composition may be amended at the discretion of Indian Railways depending on demand.

== Service ==
The 12590 Charlapalli–Gorakhpur Junction Express covers the distance of 1,830 km (1,137 mi) in 32 hours 35 mins (56 km/h) and in 32 hours 00 mins as the 12589 Gorakhpur Junction–Charlapalli (57 km/h).

As the average speed of the train is equal to 55 km/h (34 mph), as per railway rules, its fare includes a Superfast surcharge.

== Routing ==
The 12590 / 89 Charlapalli–Gorakhpur Express runs from Secunderabad Junction via Kazipet Junction, Nagpur Junction, Itarsi Junction, Jhansi Junction, Lucknow Charbagh, Basti, to Gorakhpur Junction.

== Traction ==
As the route is electrified, a Lallaguda Loco Shed-based WAP-7 electric locomotive pulls the train for its entire journey.

== See also ==
- Gorakhpur–Yesvantpur Express
