= Kazipet–Vijayawada section =

Railway line in Telangana and Andhra Pradesh, India

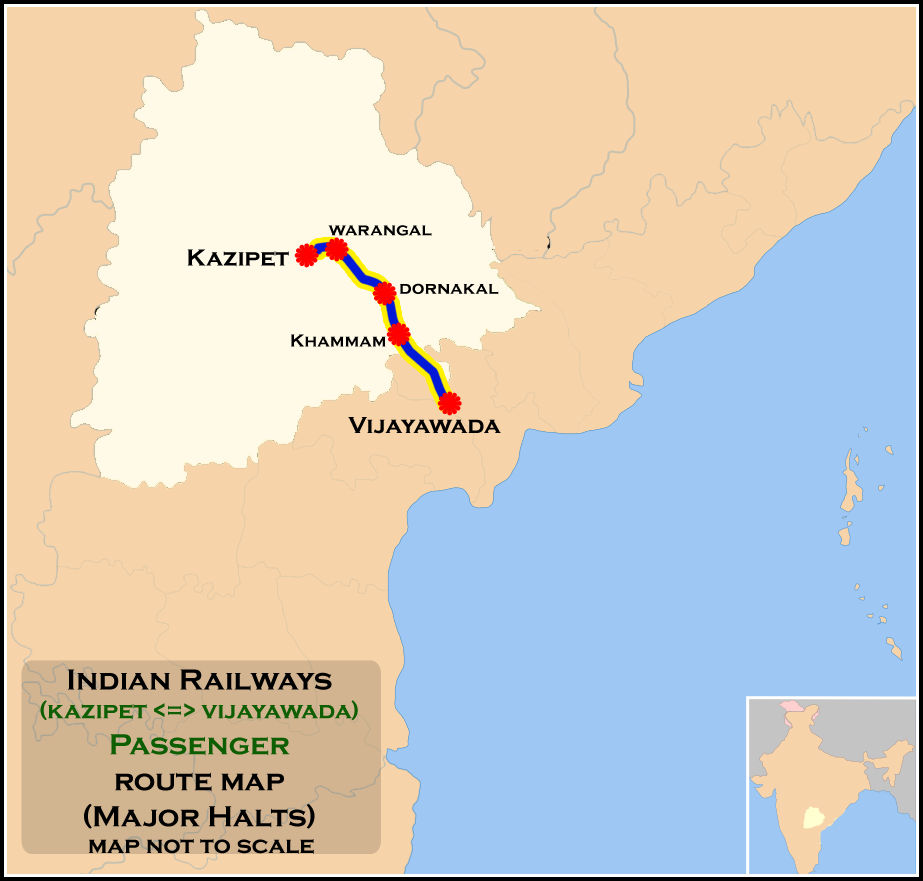
- Kazipet–Vijayawada passenger route map

Overview
- Status: Operational
- Owner: Indian Railways
- Locale: Telangana, Andhra Pradesh
- Termini: Kazipet; Vijayawada

Service
- Operator: South Central Railway
- Depot(s): Kazipet, Vijayawada
- Rolling stock: WDM-2, WDM-3A, WDG-3A, WDG-4, WDM-2, WDP-1 diesel locos; WAG-7, WAG-5 and WAM-4 electric locos.

History
- Opened: 1889; 137 years ago

Technical
- Track length: 201.14 km (125 mi)
- Number of tracks: 2
- Track gauge: 5 ft 6 in (1,676 mm) broad gauge
- Electrification: 1985–88
- Operating speed: up to 130 km/h

The Kazipet–Vijayawada section is a railway line connecting Kazipet and Vijayawada. This 201.14 km (125 mi) track is part of the New Delhi–Chennai main line. The section is under the jurisdiction of South Central Railway.

== History ==
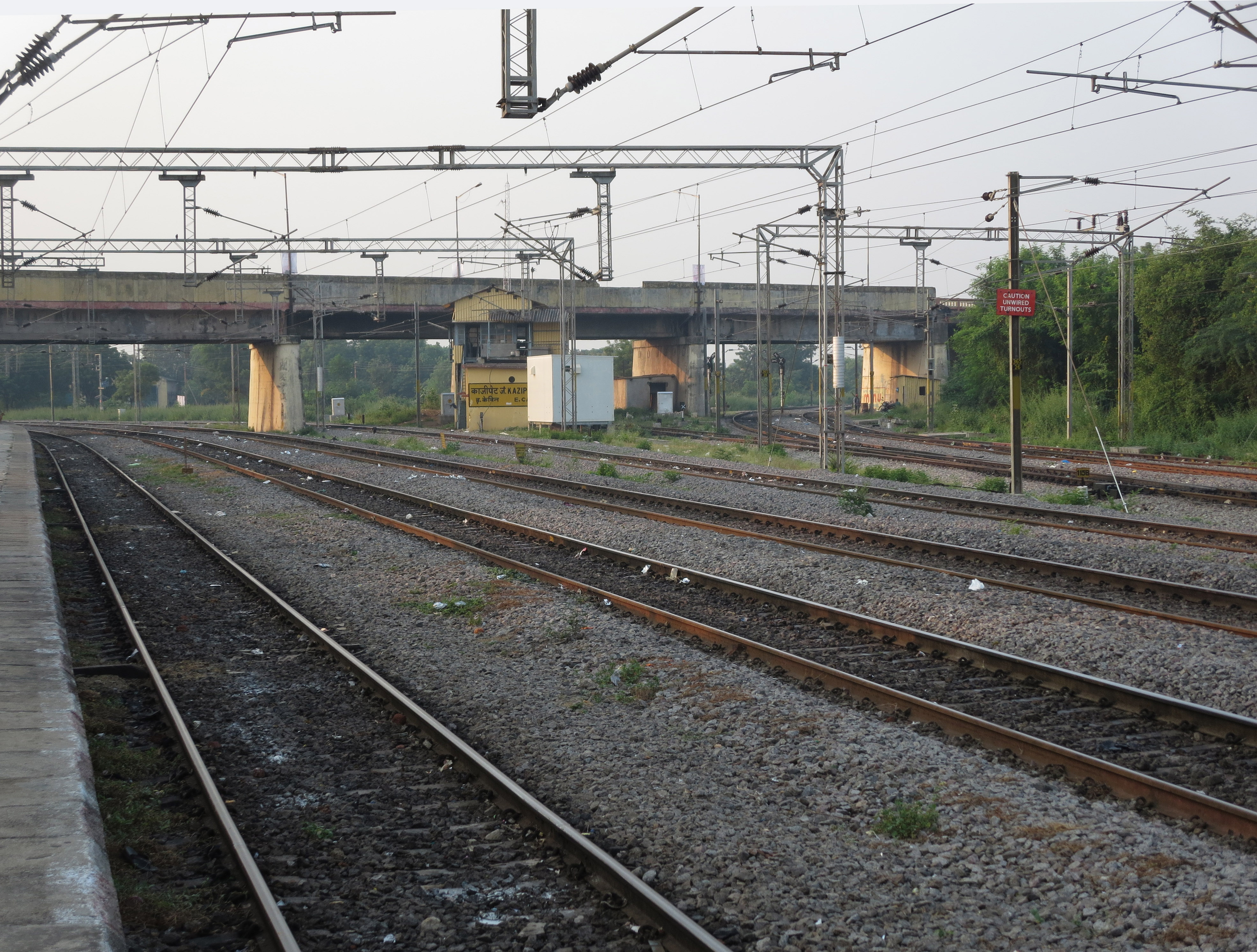
The junction where the New Delhi–Chennai line meets the Hyderabad–New Delhi line. The Hyderabad–New Delhi line lies on the right side

With the completion of the Kazipet–Balhashah link in 1929, Chennai was directly linked to Delhi.

The Wadi–Secunderabad line was built in 1874 with financing by the Nizam of Hyderabad. It later became part of Nizam's Guaranteed State Railway. In 1889, the main line of the Nizam's Guaranteed State Railway was extended to Vijayawada, then known as Bezwada.

As of 1909, "From Wadi on the Great Indian Peninsula Railway, the Nizam's Guaranteed State Railway runs east to Warangal and then south-east towards Bezwada on the East Coast section of the Madras Railway."

The Motumari–Jaggayyapeta line was extended to Mellacheruvu in 2012. It is to be extended further to Vishnupuram on the Guntur–Pagidipalli–Secunderabad line.

== Electrification ==
The Vijayawada–Madhira sector was electrified in 1985–86, the Madhira–Dornakal sector in 1986–87 and the Dornakal–Kazipet sector in 1987–88. The Motumari–Jaggayapet freight line was electrified in 1994–95.

Dornakal–Karepalli–Yellandu line was electrified in 2003 and the Karepalli–Bhadrachalam Road–Manuguru in 2008.

== Speed limits ==
The Delhi–Chennai Central line (Grand Trunk route) is classified as a "Group A" line which can take speeds up to 160 km/h.

== Passenger movement ==
Kazipet Junction is the place where Hyderabad–New Delhi line meets the Chennai–New Delhi line

Vijayawada is the only station on this line which is amongst the top hundred booking stations of Indian Railway.

== Loco sheds and coaching maintenance depots ==
Kazipet diesel loco shed houses WDG-4/4D locos. Opened in 2006, Kazipet electric loco shed houses 150+ WAG-7 and WAG-9 class locos. Vijayawada diesel loco shed has mostly WAG-9 locos only. Vijayawada electric loco shed opened in 1980, holds (as of 2026) 195+ locos. It houses WAG-9, WAP-7 and WAP-4 locos.

There are coaching maintenance depots at Vijayawada and Kazipet.
