= List of industrial areas in West Bengal =

The Indian state of West Bengal has multiple industries present in the state. The major industrial belts are Hooghly Industrial Region, Durgapur-Raniganj-Asansol Industrial Region, Haldia Industrial Region and Darjeeling-Jalpaiguri Industrial Region. Apart from these, many Industrial parks or areas are situated with planned townships. Majority of them are functioning with some of them being under construction.

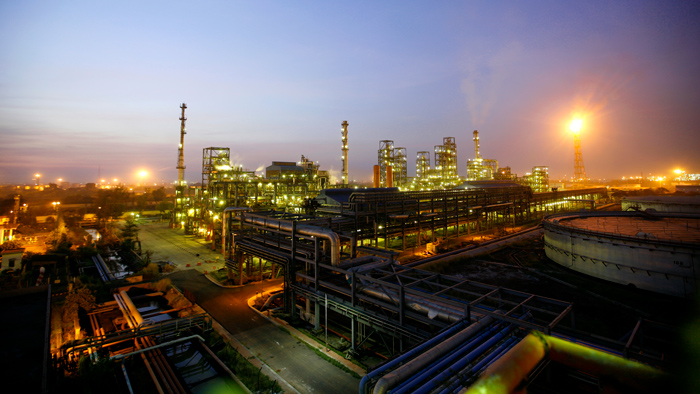
IOCL Haldia Refinery

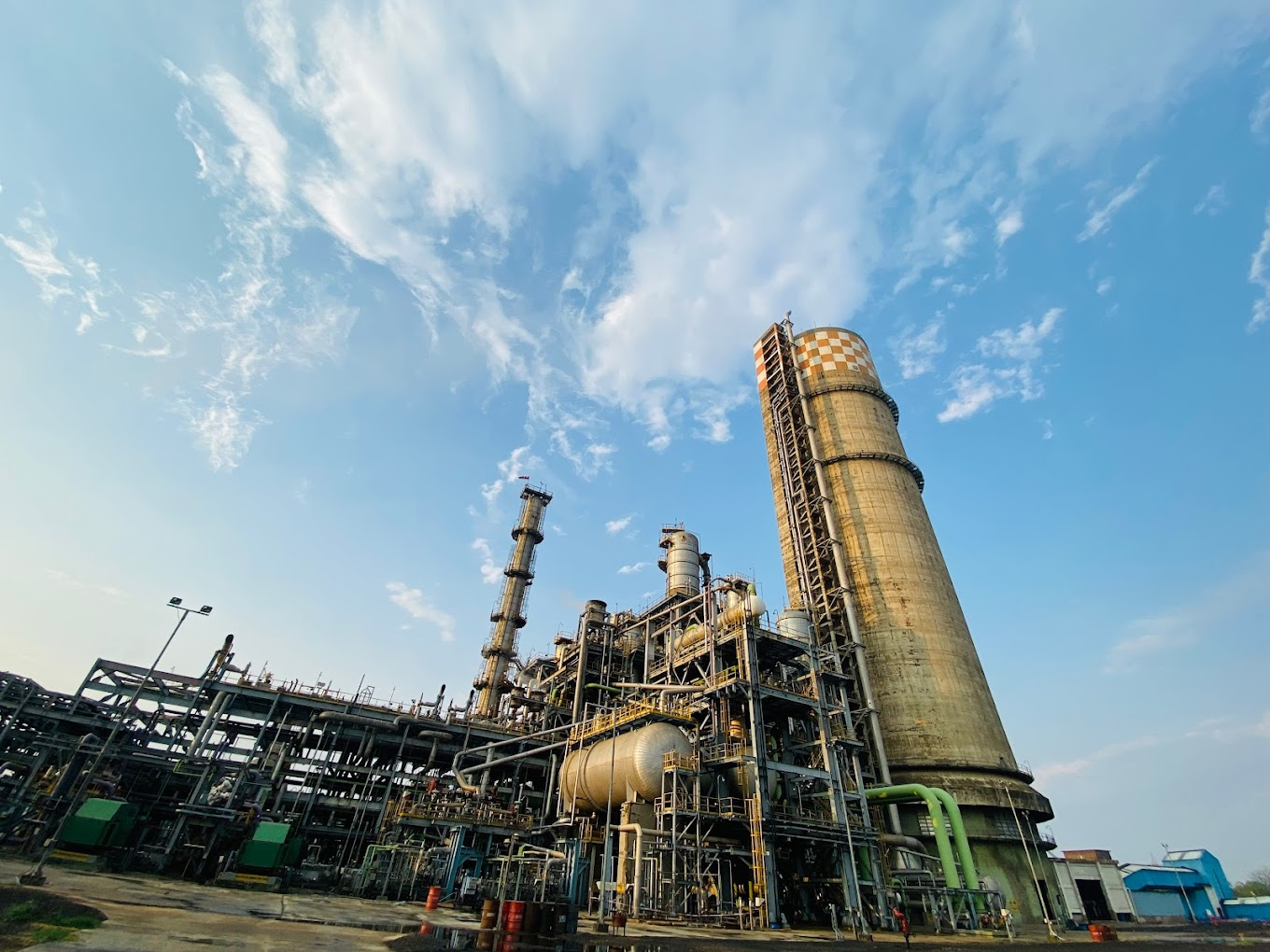
Unit of Matix Fertilizer at Panagarh Industrial Park

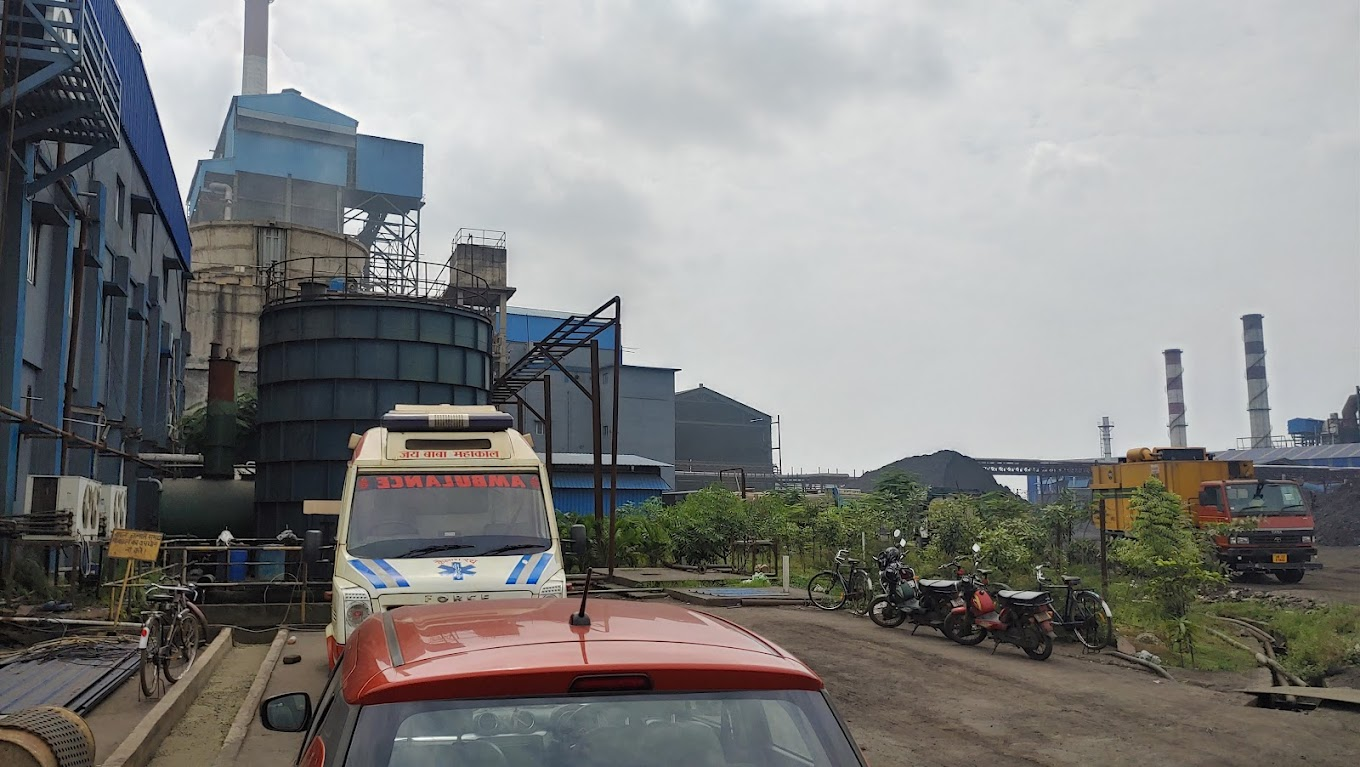
Rashmi Metallics manufacturing unit in Kharagpur

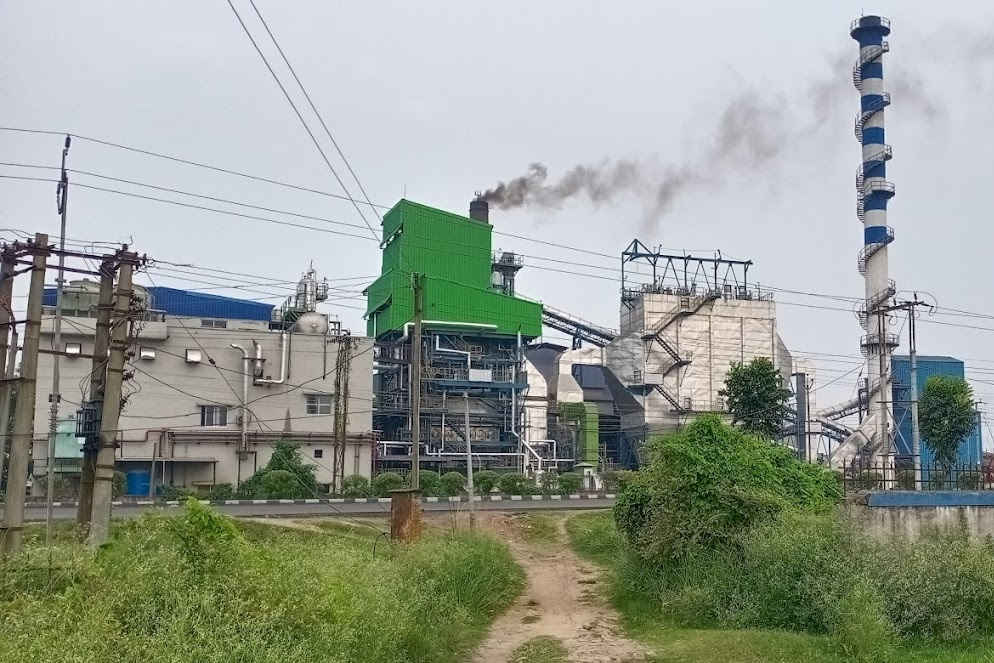
Sukhjit Starch plant in Malda

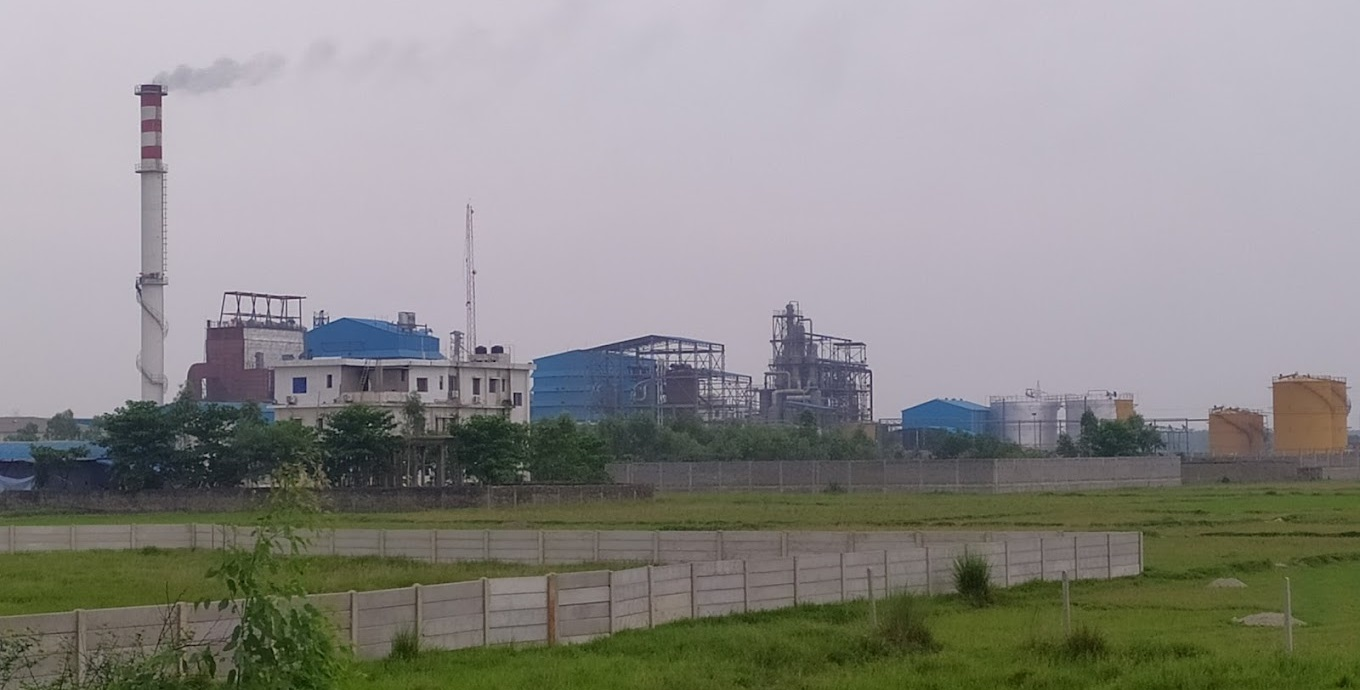
Svaksha Distillery in Kharagpur

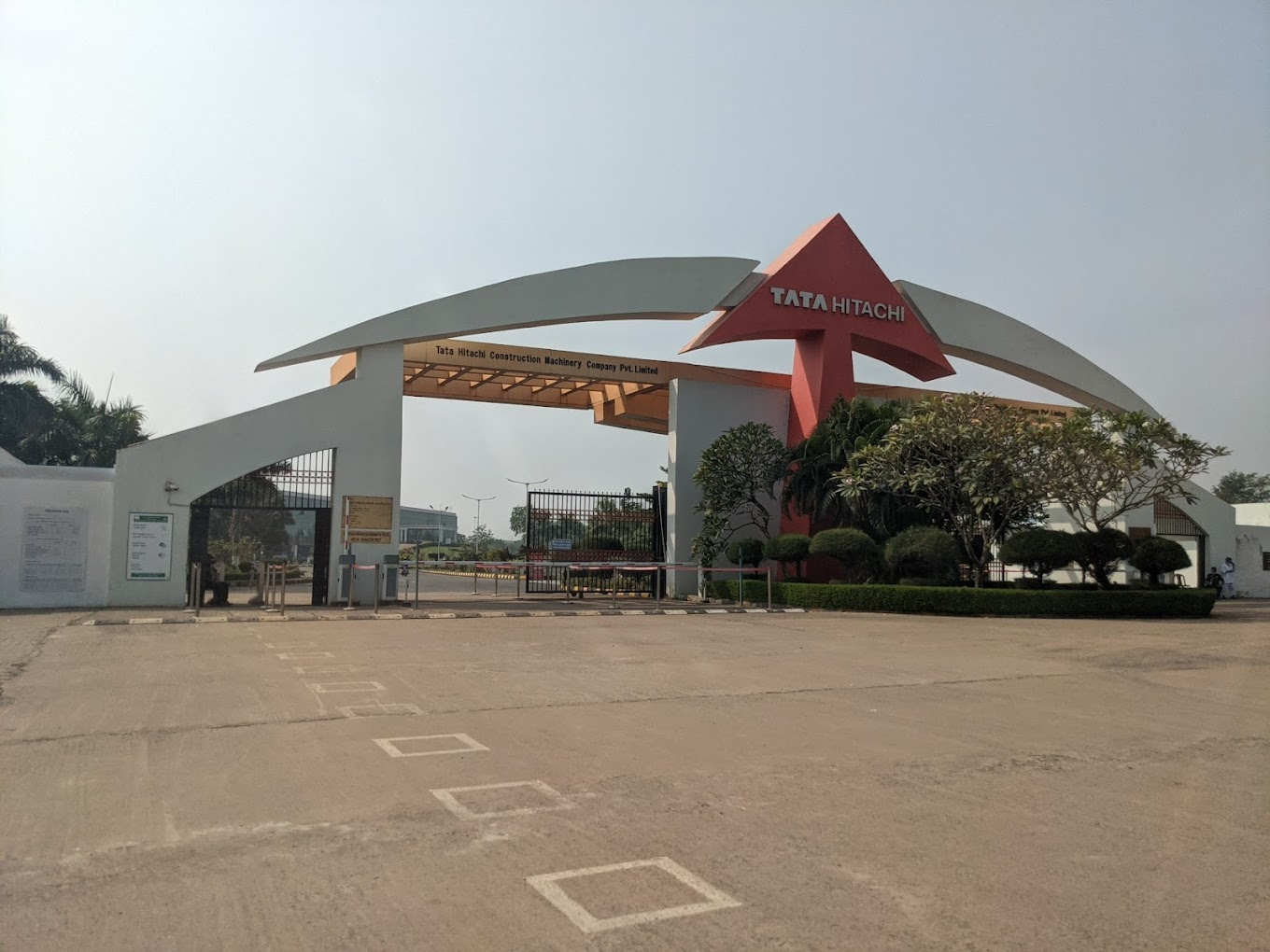
Entrance of Tata Hitachi plant at Vidyasagar Industrial Park in Kharagpur

State industries are mostly localised in the Kolkata region, the mineral-rich western highlands, and Haldia port region. Kolkata is noted as one of the major centres for industries like the IT, GCCs, ITes, jute, leather industry etc. There are numerous steel plants in the state apart from the Durgapur Steel plant and alloy steel plant at Durgapur and IISCO in Burnpur. There are major industries around petrochemicals in Haldia, heavy engineering in Durgapur Howrah, rail manufacturing in Chittaranjan and Titagath, heavy equipment manufacturing in kharagpur, power generation,chemicals and fertilisers across the state. Coal bed methane gas and shale gas is found in Durgapur Asansol region. Recently high grade petroleum has been discovered in Ashoknagar about 60 KMS from Kolkata and commercial production would begin soon. Natural resources like tea and jute in and nearby parts have made West Bengal a major centre for the jute and tea industries. West Bengal is at the forefronts of gems and jewellery, leather processing and leather goods manufacturing and has around 666 units producing leather and leather related goods. Currently, 22-25 percent of India's tanning activity is undertaken in Kolkata and its suburbs. Kharagpur has also numerous industries of various types such as iron works, cement, chemicals, etc.

== Major industrial belts ==
This list includes major economic industrial regions of West Bengal.

Name	Area	Location	Industry	Major industrial Company/ companies	Ref(s)
Hooghly Industrial Belt	2,000 km^{2}.	Kolkata, Hooghly, Howrah, Nadia, Serampore, Shyamnagar, Sodepur and other parts of North 24 Parganas, South 24 Parganas, Nadia, Hooghly district and Howrah district.	Jute Industry, Textile, Heavy engineering, Leather Industry, IT Industry, manufacturing, chemicals, iron and steel and food products	Garden Reach Shipbuilders & Engineers, Zaneti, Burn Standard Company Limited, Tribeni, Bengal Chemicals and Pharmaceuticals etc.	
Haldia Industrial Belt	350 km^{2}.	Haldia, Purba Medinipur	Petrochemicals, Chemical Industry, Oil Refinery, Fertilizer	Haldia Petrochemicals, IPPL-IndianOil Petronas, Indian Oil Corporation, Tata Steel, South Asia Petrochemical, Hindustan Liver	
Durgapur- Raniganj- Asansol industrial Belt	1,600 km^{2}.	Durgapur, Asansol, Raniganj, Raniganj Coalfield, Andal, Chittaranjan	Steel, coal industry, coal bed methane gas, hydel power, fertilizers, refractory industries, cement, coal washery, boiler manufacturing, paints, alloy and special steel plant, a coal-mining machinery plant, brick and tile manufacturing, and large thermal power units	Eastern Coalfields Limited, Shyam Steel, Indian Iron and Steel Company Limited, Chittaranjan Locomotive Works, Durgapur Steel Plant GE heavy engineering, Durgapur Thermal, Damodar Valley, Esser Gas, Great Eastern Shale gas, Matix fertilizers, Jai Balaji, Durgapur Cements etc	
Darjeeling-Jalpaiguri Industrial Belt	1,300 km^{2}.	Darjeeling, Jalpaiguri, Cooch Behar	Tea industry, tourism industry, wood industry	Terai Company Pvt Ltd	

== Industrial parks/areas/towns ==
This list includes industrial parks, areas, towns, hubs, belts etc.

Key; Yellow cells denote which are under construction or planning and operations have not started (As of 2023)
Name	Area	Location	Industrial Company/ companies	Industry	Ref(s)
Panagarh Industrial Park	1458 Acres	Panagarh, Burdwan District	Emami, Valve, Acer, Matix Fertilizers & Chemicals Ltd., H&R Johnson (India), HPCL, Globus Spirit Ltd., IOCL etc.	Cement, chemical fertilizers, Ammonia Plant, Urea Plant, bottling plant, Ceramic Tiles Manufacturing, distillery etc.	
Vidyasagar Industrial Park	1167 Acres	Kharagpur, West Medinipur	Tata-Hitachi, Indian Oil Corporation Limited, Orissa Aloy Steel private limited, Godrej Agrovet, Nutricraft India, Mahindra & Mahindra Limited, Megatherm Induction	Machinery, steel, oil	
Barzora Industrial Park	432 Acres	Barzora, Bankura District	Anandabazar Patrika, Pratyaha Newspaper, X Pro India, Timespac, Nilkamal Plastics, Surya Alloy Industries, Tulip Fabrics, Steelex Electrocast, HP Ispat, Jain Spun Industries, Maan Concast, Lalwani Industrie, Embee Ferro Alloy, Jai Ambey Metals, Royal Touch Fablon etc.	Steel, plastic, newspaper, fabric, metals etc.	
Haldia Industrial Park	334 Acres	Haldia, East Medinipur	Mitsubishi Chemicals Ltd., South Asian Petrochemicals Ltd, Indian Oil Corporation Limited (IOCL), Exide, Shaw Wallace, Tata Chemicals, Haldia Petrochemicals, Hindustan Lever Limited etc.	South Asia Petrochemical, Hindustan Liver Petrochemicals, Fertilizers	
Raghunathpur Steel & Allied Industrial Park	1924 Acres	Raghunathpur, Purulia District	Damodar Valley Corporation, Shyam Steel Industries Limited, Shree Cement, DPSC limited	Thermal power, steel, cement	
Shalbani Industrial Park	4300 Acres	Salboni, West Medinipur	JSW Group	Cement, paint, steel, solar power unit,	
Sankrail Rubber Park	170 Acres	Sankrail, Howrah District			
Rishi Bankim Silpaudyan	97 Acres	Naihati, North Twenty Four Parganas	Wimplast, Suguna Foods Limited, DTL Ancillary Limited, New Hope Animal Celesty Food Products, Syanchro Pack etc.		
Kharagpur cycle park	20 Acres	Kharagpur, West Medinipur		Cycle production	
Goaltor Industrial Park	950 Acres	Goaltor, West Medinipur			
Nabadiganta Industrial Township	430 Acres	Bidhannagar, North 24 Parganas	See list of companies having tech park here	IT, ITeS	
Budge Budge Garment Park	10 Acres	Budge Budge, South 24 Parganas		Garments and clothing	
Paridhan Garment Park		Beliaghata, Kolkata		Garments and clothing	
Shilpangan Light Engineering Park		Bidhannagar, North 24 Parganas		Light engineering	
West Bengal Hosiery Park	125 Acres	Howrah district		Garments and clothing	
Regent Garments and Apparel Park	55 Acres	Barasat, North 24 Parganas		Garments and clothing	
EIGMEF Apparel Park	13 Acres	Bidhannagar, North 24 Parganas		Garments and clothing	
Kona Integrated Garment Prak	21 Acres	Unsani, Howrah district		Garments and clothing	
Sudha Das Food Park, Sankrail	50 Acres	Sankrail, Howrah		Food and processing	
Kandua Food Park	54 Acres	Sankrail, Howrah		Food and processing	
Sankrail Food Park- III	34 Acres	Sankrail, Howrah		Food and processing	
Sankrail Poly Park	60 Acres	Sankrail, Howrah	Megaflex Plastics, Elkos Pens, Weilburger Coatings, W.Hunger Hydraulics, Rollx Technologies, Tenty Marketing, Accurate Polymers, Techcon India	Polymer production	
Gems & Jewelry Park	6 Acres	Ankurhati, Howrah	Senco Gold Limited, Calcutta Gem & Jewellers Welfare Association, Jain Jewellers	Jewelry production	
Haringhata Industrial Park	358 Acres	Nadia			
Kharagpur General Industrial Park	205 Acres	Kharagpur, West Medinipur	Tata Metaliks, Flender McNeil etc.		
Fulbari Industrial Park	32 Acres	Fulbarigram, Jalpaiguri district			
Dabgram Industrial Park	107 Acres	Dabgram, Jalpaiguri district			
Shilpobroto Industrial Park	25 Acres	Binnaguri, Jalpaiguri district			
INDUS Balram Industrial Park		Jalpaiguri district			
South City Anmol Infra Park	48 Acres	Howrah district			
Amtala Food Park	125 Acres	Amtala, South 24 Parganas			
Regent SME Industrial Park	21 Acres	Ankurhati, Howrah			
Srijan Industrial Logistic Park	24 Acres	Ankurhati, Howrah			
Jalan Complex	2000 Acres	Ankurhati, Howrah			
Amta Industrial Park					
Uluberia Industrial Park					
Ranihati Foundry Park					
Dankuni Industrial Park					
Bagnan Industrial Park					

== Cities with major industries ==
No.	Place	Significance
1	Kolkata	IT, BPO, GCCs, Manufacturing, Cotton textile, Leather, Food processing, Hospitality, Tourism
2	Durgapur	Iron and steel, coal, CBM gas, graphite, power, cement, chemicals, heavy engineering, Fertilizers, IT
3	Kharagpur	Chemicals, machinery, heavy metals, automobiles, railways, cement
4	Haldia	Petrochemical, refinery, industrial chemicals
5	Darjeeling	Tea
6	Chittaranjan	Electric locomotives (CLW)
7	Rupnarayanpur	Cables
8	Howrah	Jute, light engineering
9	Dankuni	Warehouse, locomotives, heavy engineering, milk and beverages, biscuits
10	Rishra	Textile, jute, cotton, heavy engineering
11	Champdani	Jute, cotton, heavy engineering
12	Bhadreswar	Jute
13	Tribeni	Tissue paper
14	Kalimpong	Tea, wood
15	Siliguri	Tea, timber, IT
16	Dalkhola	Maize
17	Raiganj	Rice
18	Malda	Mango
19	Rampurhat	Mining, stone crushing, rice
20	Suri	Rice, silk, furniture
21	Shantiniketan	Handicrafts, rice
22	Baharampur	Silk, sarees, ivory, sholapith, metal, Brass
23	Jangipur	Tobacco, mulberry
24	Kalyani	Heavy engineering, pharmaceutical, bio-technology, meat processing, rice
25	Katwa	Rice, jute, mustard
26	Bardhaman	Rice, brick, food processing, potato
27	Asansol	Coal, Iron and steel, Locomotives, heavy engineering, cement, cables
28	Budge Budge	Petroleum, jute, power
29	Kanchrapara	Electrical locomotives and workshop, railway coaches, furniture
30	Halisahar	Jute, pulp, paper
31	Naihati	Jute, paint
32	Bhatpara	Jute, paper, battery, heavy engineering
33	Barrackpore	Jute, rifles, aeronautical, heavy engineering, dry cells, cables
34	Titagarh	Jute, wagons, paper, steel, heavy engineering
35	Khardah	Jute, heavy engineering
36	Panihati	Jute, chemical, heavy engineering, tractor, tobacco
37	Kamarhati	Jute, paper, heavy engineering, matches, ceramics
38	Dum Dum	Heavy engineering, guns, bullets, railway wagon, construction equipment
39	Jangal Sundari Karmanagari	
