= Kangsabati River =

River in West Bengal, India

Coordinates: 22°55′20″N 86°46′47″E

Kangsabati River Cossye
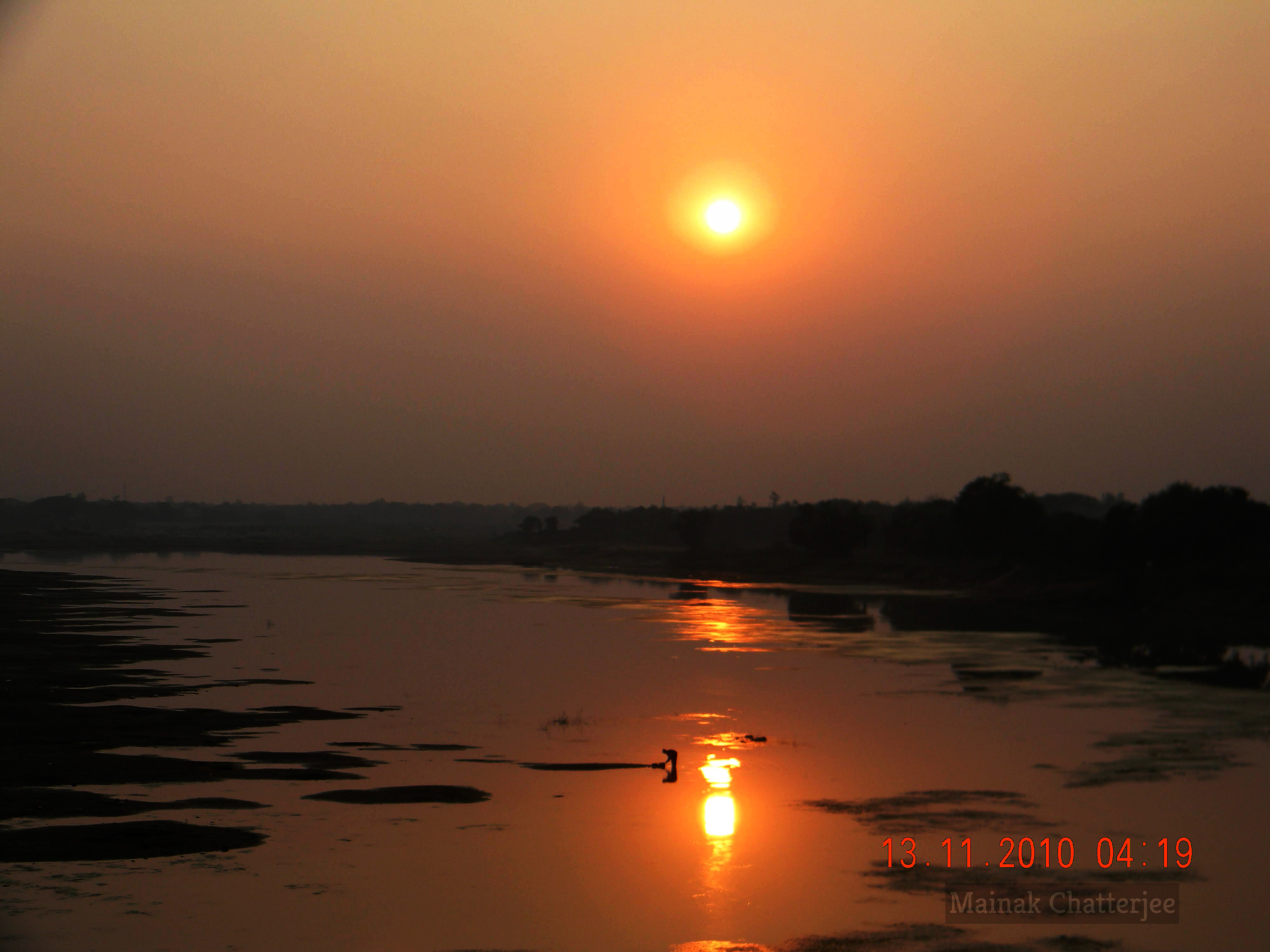
- Kangsabati River near Midnapore City

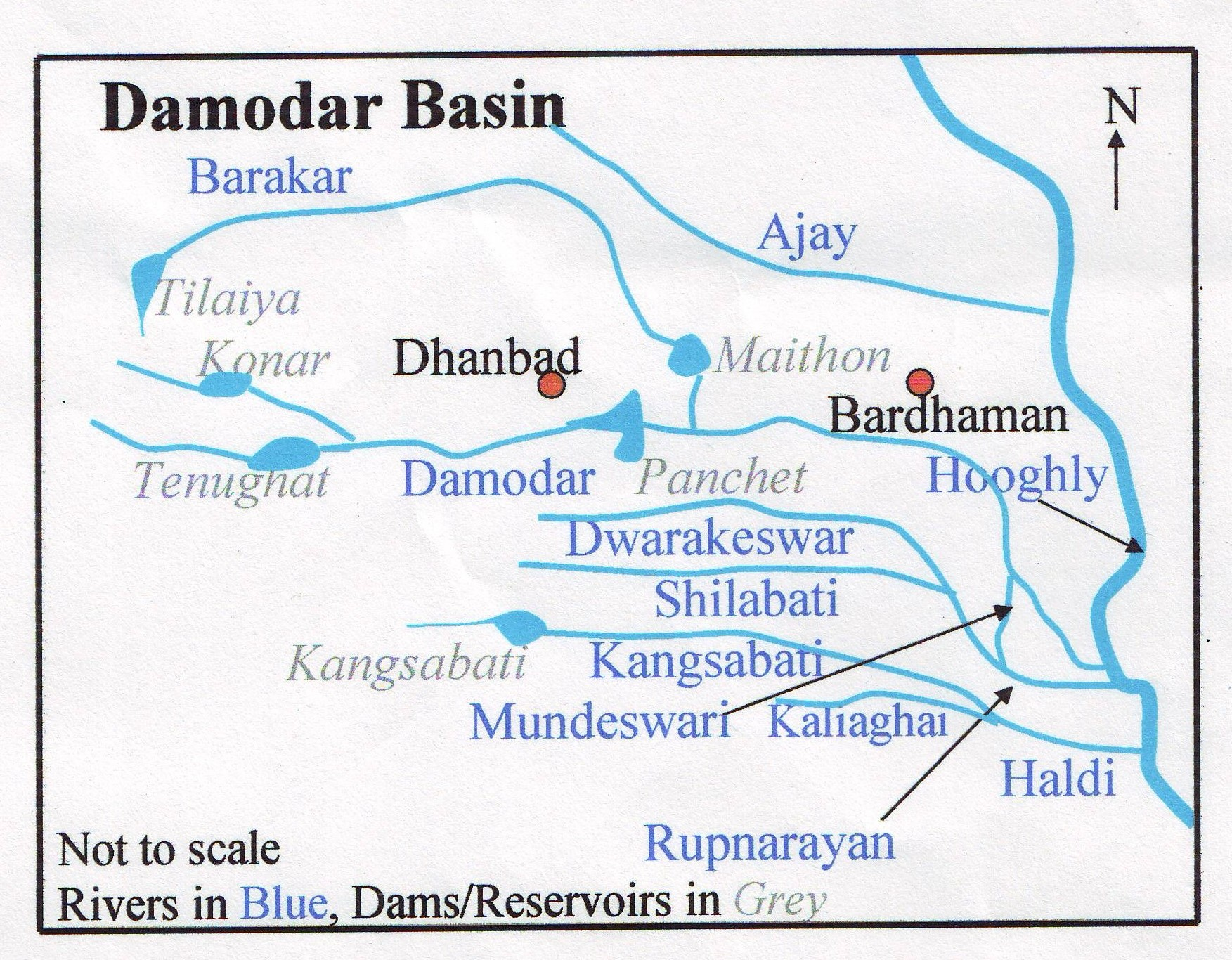

Location
- Country: India
- State: West Bengal
- Cities: Purulia, Bankura, Midnapore, Kharagpur

Physical characteristics
- Source
  - location: Jabor Pahar, Purulia district, Chota Nagpur Plateau, West Bengal
- Length: 465.23 km (289.08 mi)
- Discharge
  - location: Haldia

Basin features
- Tributaries
  - right: Kumari River

Kangsabati River (Pron:/ˌkæŋsəˈbɑːtɪ/) (also variously known as the Kãsai and Cossye) rises from the Chota Nagpur plateau in the state of West Bengal, India and passes through the districts of Purulia, Bankura, Jhargram, Paschim Medinipur and Purba Medinipur in West Bengal before draining in the Bay of Bengal.

== Course ==
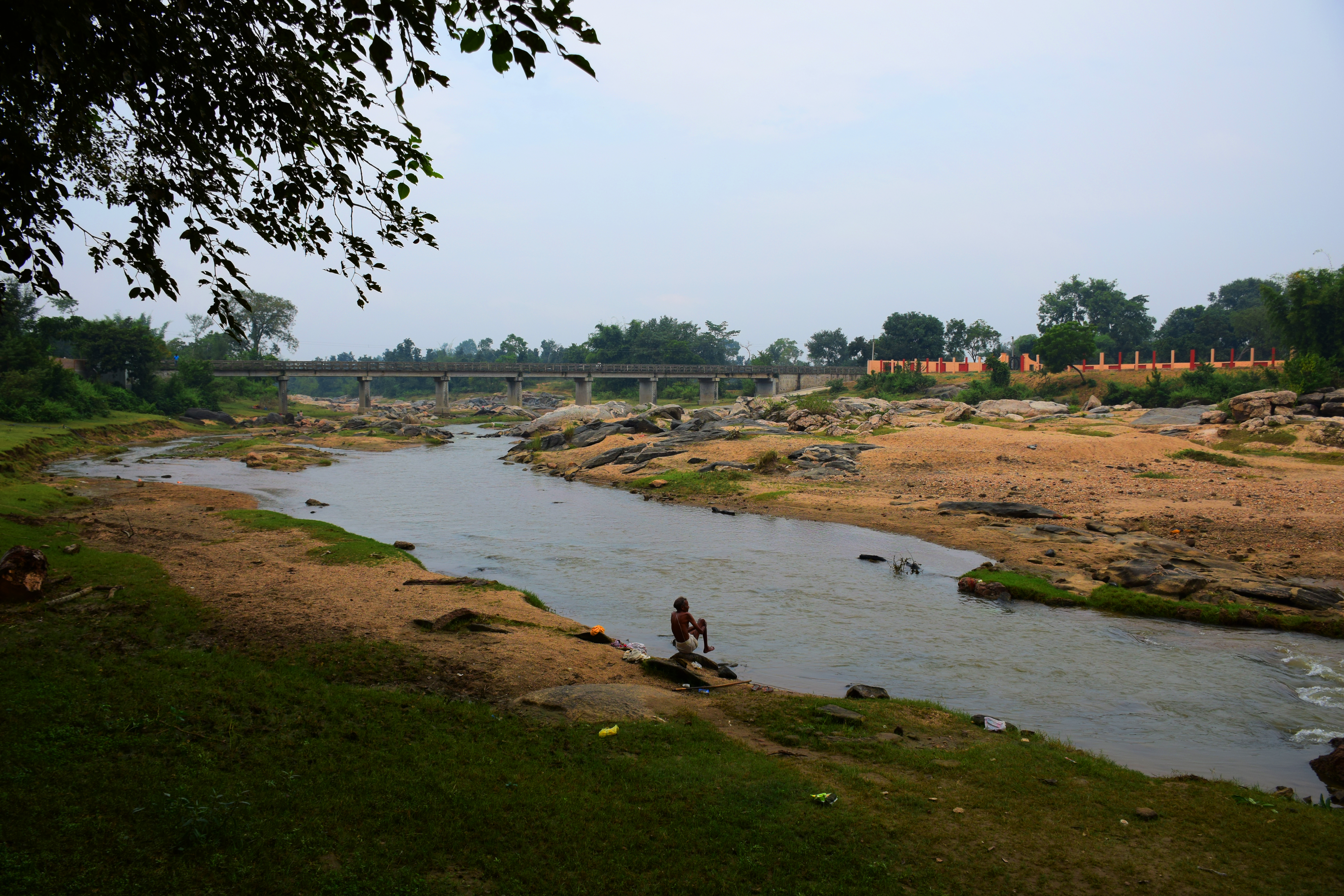
The river flowing besides Deulghata in Purulia district

The river's headwaters are on the Chota Nagpur Plateau in Purulia district, near the city of Jhalda, where the smaller rivers Saharjhor and Girgiri join together. From there, it passes through Bankura district, passing the towns of Purulia, Khatra and Ranibandh. At Binpur it is joined by the Bhairabbanki, and at Keshpur the river splits into two.

The northern branch flows through the Daspur area, where it is known as the Palashpai Canal. This branch eventually flows into the Rupnarayan River. The other branch, still called the Kangsabati, flows in a south-easterly direction. Eventually, it meets the Keleghai River, and the junction of the two forms the Haldi River, which flows into the Bay of Bengal at Haldia.

== Kangsabati Project ==
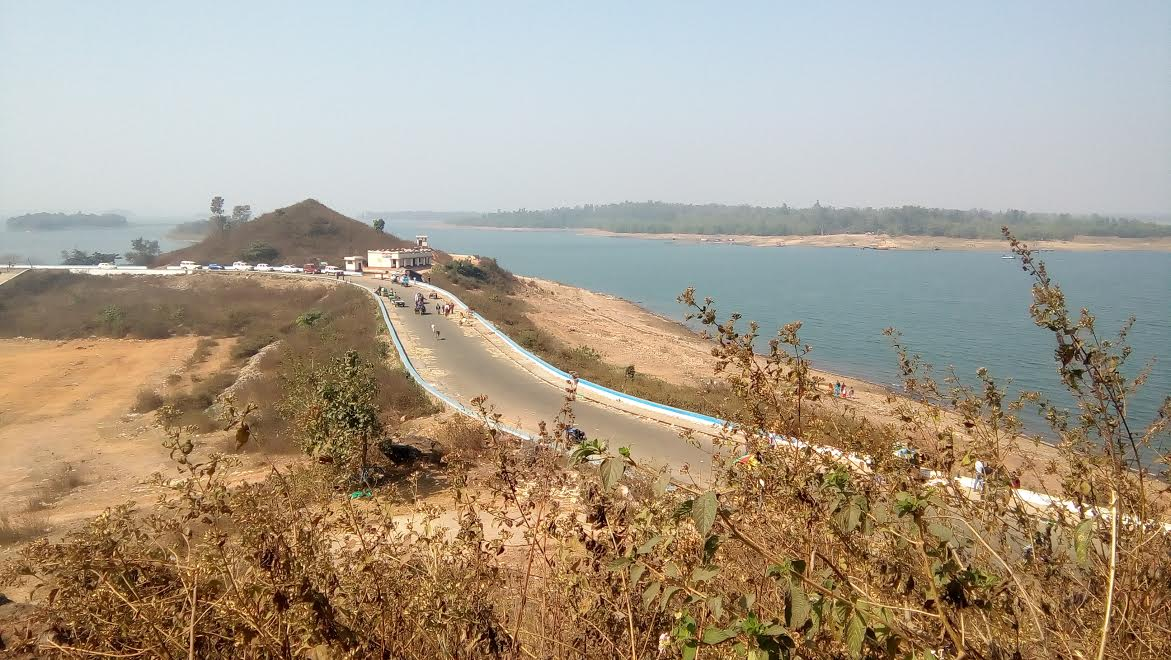
Kangsavati Reservoir, West Bengal, India

In 1956, the Indian government launched the Kangsabati Irrigation Project (also called the Kangsabati Reservoir Project) to provide water for the irrigation of Bankura, Hooghly, and Midnapore districts (the last now partitioned into Paschim Medinipur and Purba Medinipur districts). To facilitate this, Mukutmanipur Dam was constructed at the border of Purulia and Bankura districts near Mukutmanipur, creating a large reservoir. It is an earthen gravity dam with a concrete saddle spillway, standing 38 metres (125 ft) high and 10,098 m (33,130 ft) long with a gross storage capacity of 1.04 cubic kms (36.73 tmcft). Prior to this project, an anicut dam built on the Kangsabati River near Midnapore in 1784 was the sole irrigational structure on the river. As of August 2008, the dam provided water to just under 3,500 square kilometres (1,400 mi^{2}) of land.

== See also ==
- List of rivers of India
- Rivers of India
