= Kalapathar =

Village in West Bengal, India

- Village
- Location in West Bengal, India Kalapathar (India)
- Coordinates: 22°54′20.5″N 86°53′28.7″E
- Country: India
- State: West Bengal
- District: Bankura

Area
  - Total: 1.54 km^{2} (0.59 sq mi)

Population (2020)
  - Total: 536
  - Density: 348/km^{2} (901/sq mi)

Languages
  - Official: Bengali, Santali, English
- Time zone: UTC+5:30 (IST)
- Telephone/STD code: 03243
- Lok Sabha constituency: Bankura
- Vidhan Sabha constituency: Ranibandh
- Website: bankura.gov.in

Kalapathar is a village in the Bankura district, West Bengal, India. It is 156 kilometres (97 mi) west of Kolkata and 1,159 kilometres (720 mi) southeast of New Delhi. It is near the Shilabati River, the channel from Mukutmanipur, and a small unnamed stream. Kadamdeuli Dam is situated on the west 3 kilometres (1.9 mi) away.

According to the 2020 census, there are 536 people in Kalapathar.
