= Haldia Industrial Belt =

Haldia Industrial Area
- Industrial Area
- Country: India
- District: Purba Medinipur district
- City: Haldia

Area
  - Total: 350 km^{2} (140 sq mi)
- Main Industry: Petrochemicals, Chemical Industry, Oil Refinery, Fertilizer

Haldia Industrial Belt or Haldia Industrial Zone is an industrial area established in Eastern Midnapore district, West Bengal, India. This industrial area is housed in the center of Haldia port. The main industrial center of this industrial city is Petrochemicals. Industrial area is developed with more than 350 km^{2} area of Haldia sub-division.

== Location ==
Haldia Industrial Zone is formed by river on three sides. The Rupnarayan river and Hooghly River in the north, the Hooghly River on the east and the Haldi River on the south. The industrial area is 40 km away from the Bay of Bengal by Hooghly River. The industrial area is 10 meters high from the sea level.

== See also ==
- Hooghly Industrial Belt
