= Chittaranjan =

Chittaranjan Nature's Paradise
- Central Government Township
- Nickname: City of Lakes
- Location in West Bengal, India Chittaranjan (India)
- Coordinates: 23°50′58.811″N 86°54′6.374″E
- Country: India
- State: West Bengal
- District: Paschim Bardhaman
- Established: 1948
- Founder: Government of India
- Named for: Chittaranjan Das

Government
  - Type: Central government
  - Body: Ministry of Railways (India)

Area
  - Total: 18.34 km^{2} (7.08 sq mi)
- Elevation: 155 m (509 ft)

Population (2011)
  - Total: 39,098
  - Density: 2,132/km^{2} (5,521/sq mi)
- Demonym: CRJians Chittaranjanbashi

Languages*
  - Official: Bengali, Hindi, English
- Time zone: UTC+5:30 (IST)
- PIN: 713331, 713365
- Vehicle registration: WB
- Lok Sabha constituency: Asansol
- Vidhan Sabha constituency: Barabani
- Website: paschimbardhaman.co.in

Chittaranjan is a census town in the Salanpur CD block in the Asansol Sadar subdivision of Paschim Bardhaman district in the state of West Bengal, India. The Chittaranjan Locomotive Works are situated there.

The town of Chittaranjan was featured in the final episode of BBC's The Great Indian Railway Journeys, which aired on 10 April 2018. The episode highlighted the management of Chittaranjan Locomotive Works (CLW) and the significance of this town.

== History ==
Before the town's development, the area was heavily forested. The discovery of coal led to its industrialization, which resulted in clearing most of the forests.

== Geography ==
Chittaranjan is located at 23.87°N 86.87°E. It has an average elevation of 155 metres (508 feet).

Cities, towns and ECL Areas in the western portion of Asansol Sadar subdivision in Paschim Bardhaman district
MC: municipal corporation, P: rural administrative centre, CT: census town, N: neighbourhood, OG: out growth, T: temple
Owing to space constraints in the small map, the actual locations in a larger map may vary slightly

As per the 2011 census, 83.33% of the population of Asansol Sadar subdivision was urban and 16.67% was rural. In 2015, the municipal areas of Kulti, Raniganj and Jamuria were included within the jurisdiction of Asansol Municipal Corporation. Asansol Sadar subdivision has 26 (+1 partly) Census Towns. (partly presented in the map alongside; all places marked on the map are linked in the full-screen map).

== Civic administration ==
=== Police station ===
Chittaranjan police station has jurisdiction over a part of Salanpur CD block. The area covered is 18.34 km^{2} and Chittaranjan has a population of 39,098. Hindus comprise 95.42% of the population.9,205.

=== Languages ===
Languages spoken in Chittaranjan Town (2011)
1. Bengali (48.2%)
2. Hindi (41.9%)
3. Santali (2.25%)
4. Bhojpuri (2.06%)
5. Telugu (1.22%)
6. Others (4.28%)

== Demographics ==
	2001	2011
Total population	45,925	39,098
Male population		20,089 (51.3%)
Female population	21585 (47%)	19,009 (48.6%)
(0-6)yrs age population	4,592 (10%)	2,769 (7%)
Literacy rate	83%	85.9%
Male literacy rate	88%	89%
Female literacy rate	79%	82.6%

*For language details see Salanpur (community development block)#Language and religion

== Transport ==
Chittaranjan is a vast railways township on the border of Jharkhand and West Bengal. The Chittaranjan railway station is located in Mihijam, Jharkhand. Chittaranjan railway station is in Howrah-Patna-Mughalsarai main line at a distance of 237 km from Howrah The nearest important railway junction is Asansol situated 25 km away. Most of the Patna, Barauni bound express trains coming from Howrah, Sealdah, Ranchi, Kharagpur, Tatanagar, and Dhanbad stop here. The GT road or NH-2 passes 20 km south to Chittaranjan. By road, it is connected to Dhanbad (65 km) and Dumka (100 km). Road transports of both Bengal and Jharkhand can be accessed from here. A unique feature of this place is that the railway station is located at Jharkhand state (name of the place- Mihijam, district: Jamtara) whereas the railway township is in West Bengal.

Chittaranjan also has more than 50 bus services that includes government run and private run buses. It has a dedicated bus stand at Gate no. 1 where buses arrive and depart to Haldia, Kolkata, Bankura, Mukutmonipur, Burdwan, Kalna, Asansol, Raniganj, Durgapur, Bongaon and elsewhere.

The nearest Airport Kazi Nazrul Islam Airport is around 61 km from Chittaranjan.

== Chittaranjan Locomotive Works ==
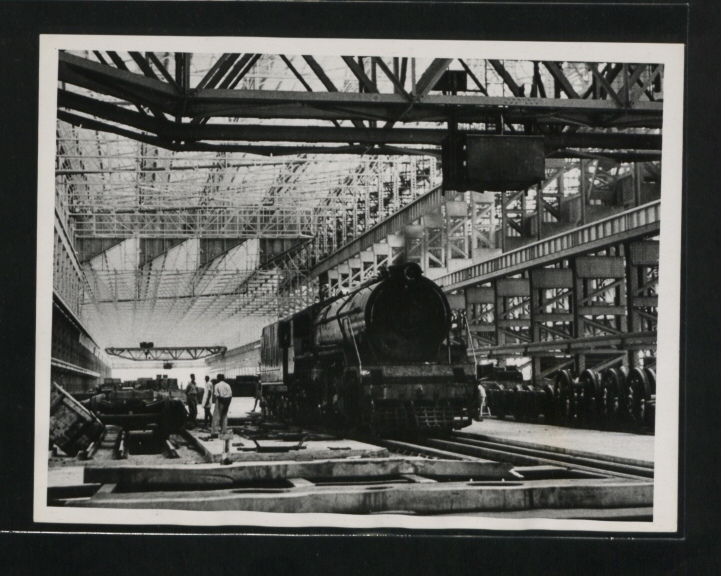
Chittaranjan locomotive works (c. 1950-60)

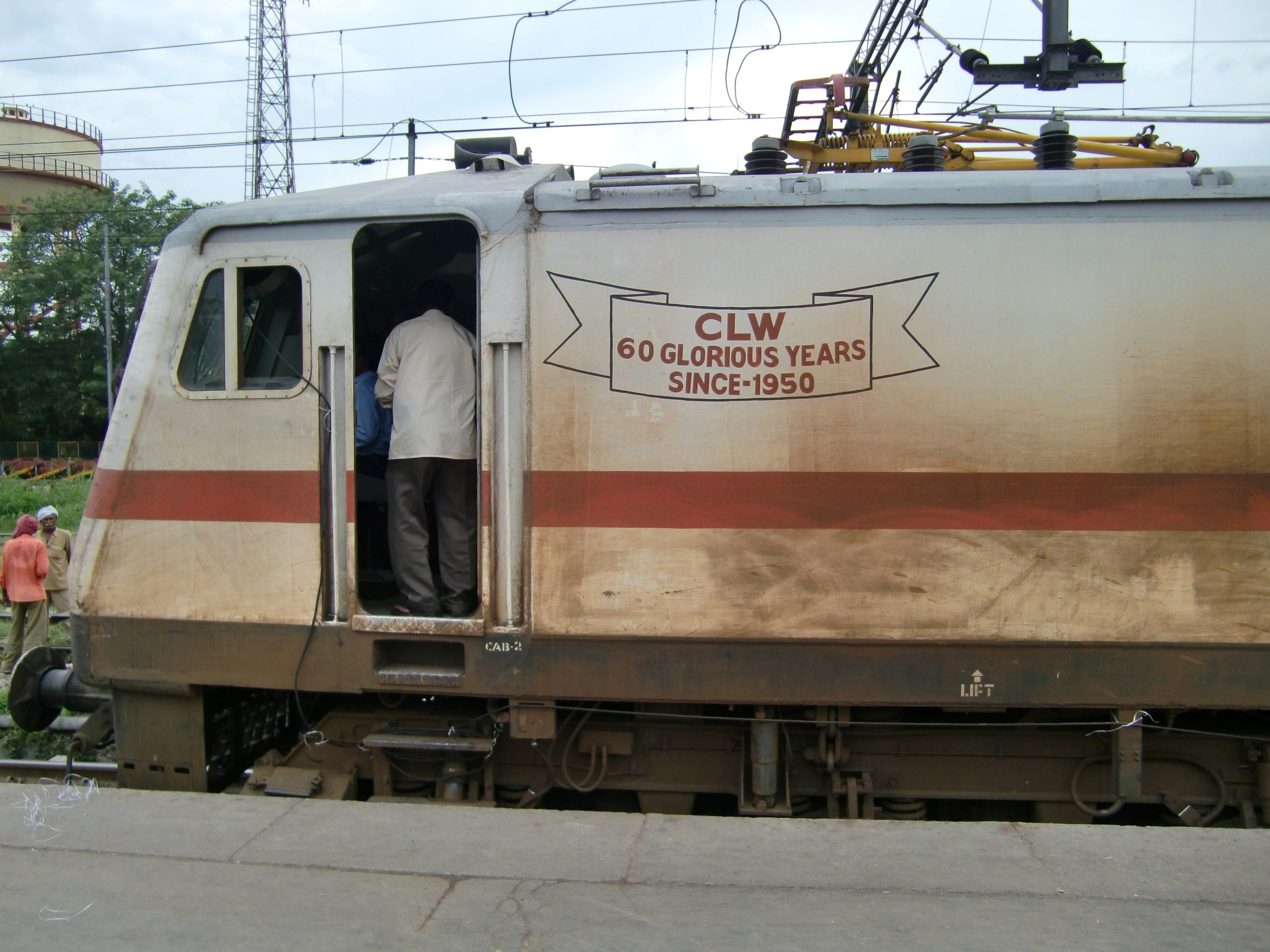
60 Years of CLW

Chittaranjan is well known for Chittaranjan Locomotive Works (CLW), which manufactures mainline diesel broad gauge locomotives. This factory commenced production in 1950; and up to 1972, it was involved in the production of broad gauge and meter gauge steam locomotives. Production of diesel locomotives commenced in 1963. In addition to steam and diesel locomotives, CLW also produced narrow gauge (762 mm) diesel locomotives of the ZDM class, meter gauge (1000 mm) diesel locomotives of the YDM class, and broad gauge hydraulic shunting locomotives of the WDS4 class. It also produced few special narrow gauge (2 ft, as in Darjeeling Himalayan Railway) diesel locomotives of the NDM class. Production of steam locomotives was discontinued in 1972 when the last steam locomotive, titled 'ANTIM SITARA' (The Last Star), was rolled out. Towards the early 1990s, production of diesel locomotives in CLW was discontinued altogether.

Today, Chittaranjan is the largest maker of diesel engine locomotives. The present staff strength of CLW is around 13,000 people making it the biggest unit of the Indian Railways.

== Infrastructure ==
According to the District Census Handbook 2011, Bardhaman, Chittaranjan covered an area of 19.65 km^{2}. Among the civic amenities, it had 203 km roads with covered drains, the protected water supply involved over-head tank and tap water from treated sources. It had 9,100 domestic electric connections and 2,500 road lighting (points). Among the medical facilities it had 1 hospital, 1 dispensary/ health centre, 16 medicine shops. Among the educational facilities it had were 19 primary schools, 5 secondary school, 7 senior secondary school, 1 general degree college. It had 3 non-formal education entres (Sarva Shiksha Abhiyan),1 special school for disabled. Among the social cultural and recreational facilities, it had 3 stadiums, 1 cinema theatre, 9 auditorium/ community halls, 4 public library, 2 reading room. Among the important commodities it produced were locomotives, steel castings. It had the branch offices of 3 nationalised banks and 1 non-agricultural credit society.

== Facilities ==
Chittaranjan, an ISO 14001 certified township has neatly arranged row-houses, broad, clean roads, greenery and lakes. The township houses over 9300 quarters of various types and sizes for the employees of CLW.

All these quarters are neatly grouped under various areas (equivalent to wards in cities) with each area having its own Primary Health Unit (locally famous as dispensary), marketplace, primary school, and a community hall. In addition to the dispensaries in each area, Chittaranjan also has its own 200-bed hospital - the Kasturba Gandhi Hospital.

Being a railway colony, a total of 3 DVC (Damodar Valley Corporation) power lines enters Chittaranjan to ensure a proper 24hrs electricity supply to the railway colony.

The Diminutive Hilltop is the main water treatment plant located in Chittaranjan where water is purified and supplied to the households generally twice a day, though the main infrastructures (like the hospital and GM office) receive a non-stop water supply.

It also has two playgrounds: the Oval Ground and the Srilata Ground, which holds sub-divisional tournaments. There is also a helipad built at the Oval ground, used by visiting delegates.

In addition to this, Chittaranjan has two multi-sport stadiums, two swimming pools, a basketball court, a badminton court, a lawn tennis court, football grounds, a gymnasium and a fully air-conditioned indoor stadium.

Chittaranjan has a dedicated officer's club popularly called as the Chittaranjan Club which is used by officers for recreational purposes.

Chittaranjan also has its own cinema theatre known as "Ranjan" which primarily shows Hindi and Bengali movies in addition to this it also has many centres for recreational purposes and extracurricular activities like singing and martial arts. Rabindra Manch holds a majority of theatre performances. T There are many community halls which hold festivals like Durga Puja and are used for parties. There is also a park situated at the heart of city known as Children's Park.

There is also a riverine front of Ajay River which makes it an excellent picnic spot.

A permit pass is required to enter Chittaranjan. There are three gates to enter or leave the township which are protected by the armed RPF (Railway Protection Force).

== Environment ==
Chittaranjan is known for its greenery. The government takes initiatives to make the environment cleaner and hygienic. The city houses four lakes. Many species of migratory birds visit this city during the winter. A total of more than 200 species of birds can be seen here, making it a place for bird watchers. This planned suburb is featured with its sanitary system and clean streets.

Chittaranjan has been given a Golden Peacock award by Lalu Prasad Yadav, former Railway Minister for the ISO-14001 certified green city, which is generally called "Swarg" (meaning: "Heaven").

== Photo gallery ==
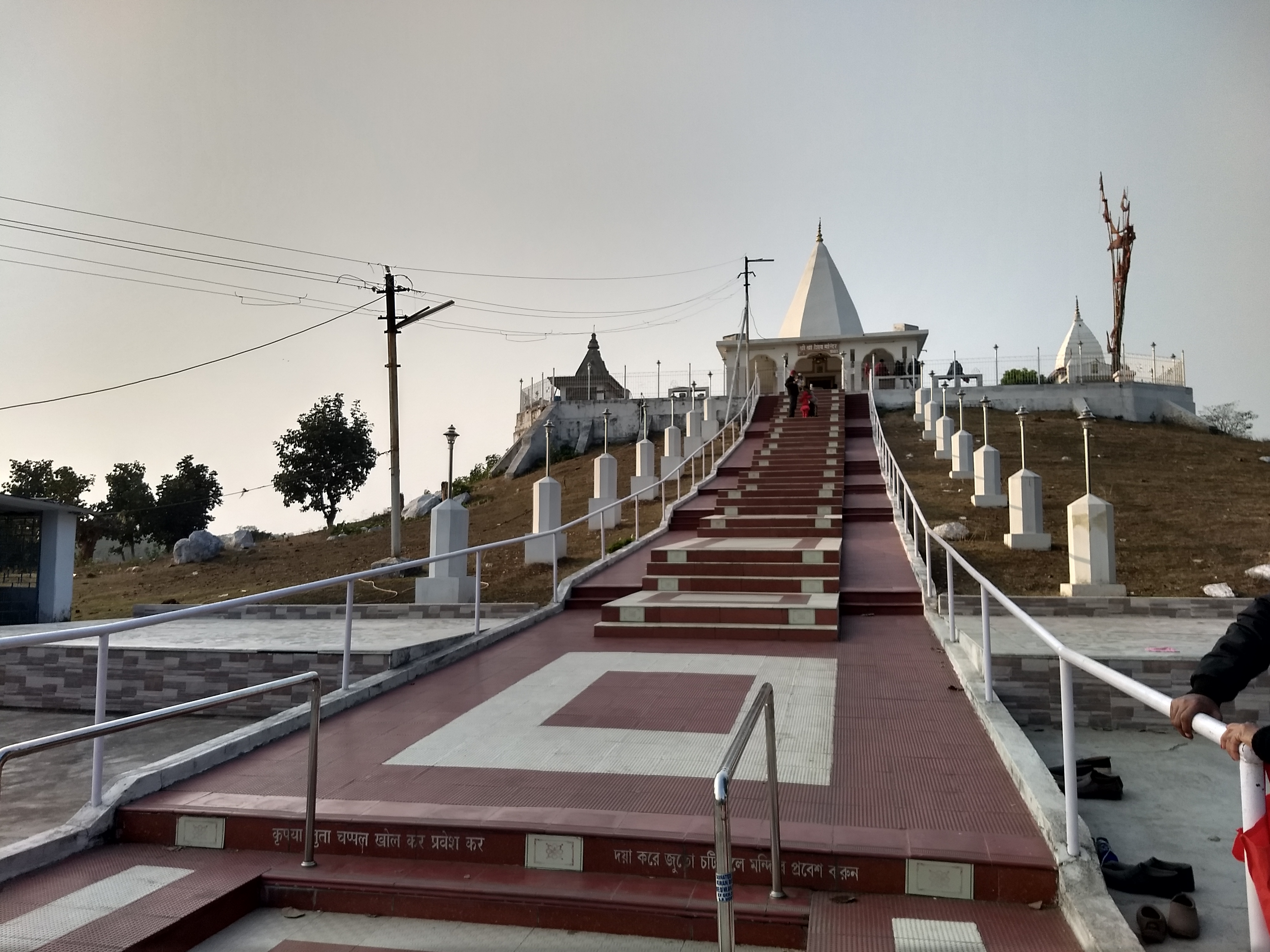
Shiva Mandir, North Area Chittaranjan

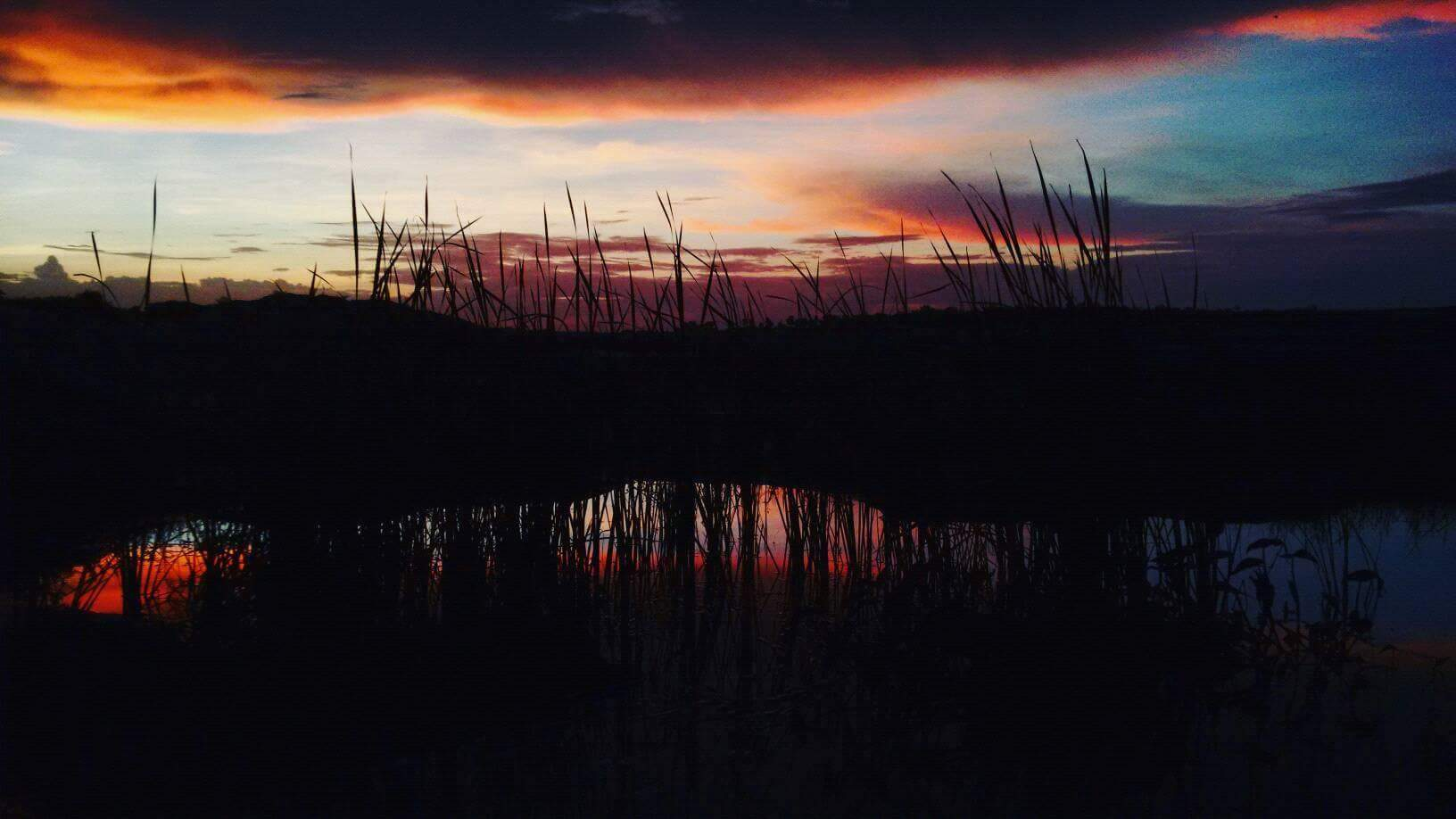
Sunset near the Ajay river

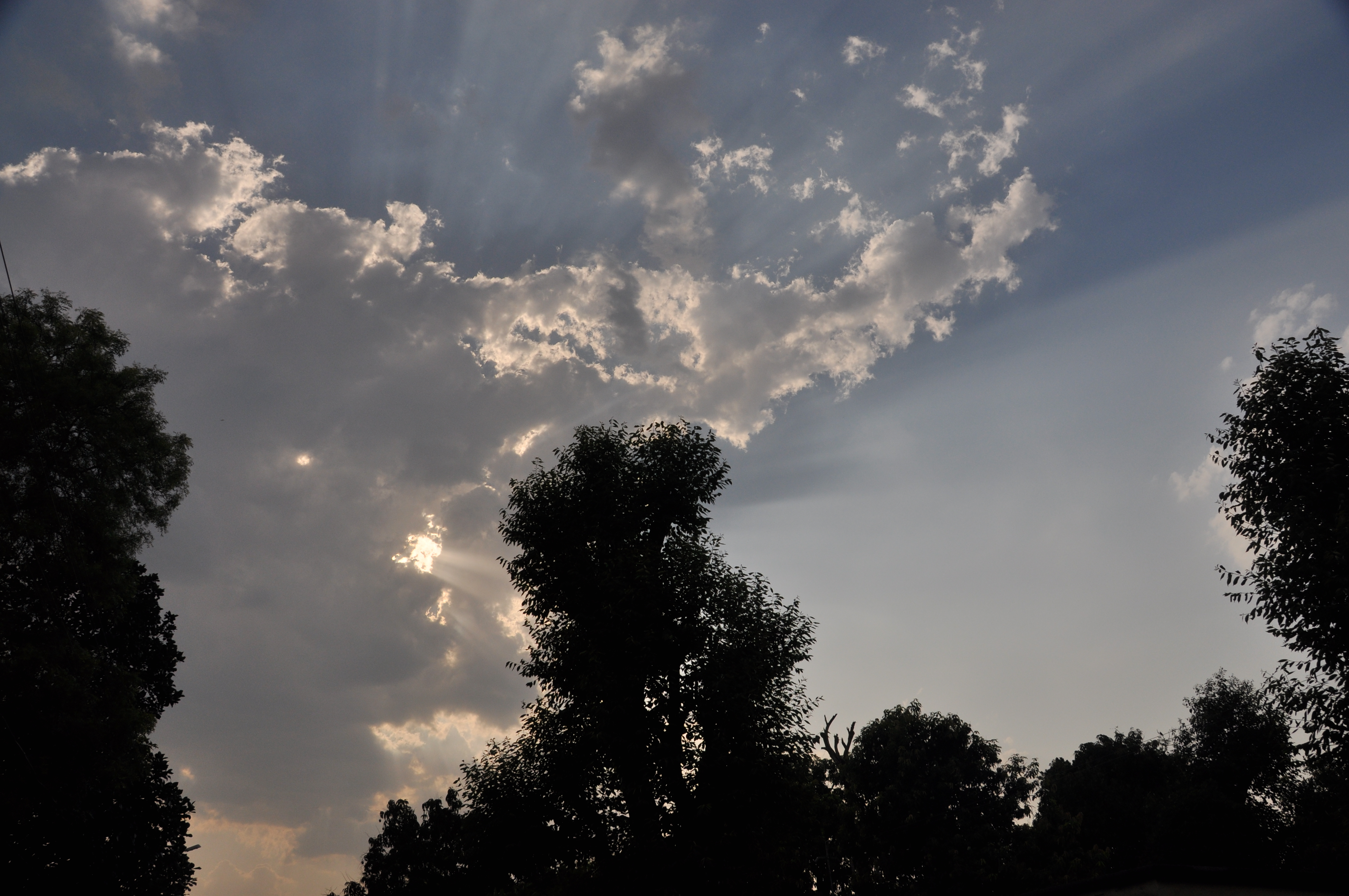
The pollution free evening

== See also ==
- Chittaranjan Locomotive Works
