= Haldia International Sports City =

Sports-themed city in Haldia, West Bengal, India

- Interactive map of Haldia International Sports City
- Location: Haldia, West Bengal
- Coordinates: 22°04′02″N 88°03′36″E
- Capacity: 40,000

Haldia International Sports City is a cancelled sports-themed city in Haldia, West Bengal. It was planned to be India's first planned city developed and aimed for sports. Haldia International Sports City was planned to be a replica of Dubai Sports City. Shristi Infrastructure Development Corporation Ltd, a subsidiary of Srei Capital, is the developer.

Haldia International Sports City was planned to consist of a 40,000 seater-outdoor cricket stadium, while the indoor stadium would have seated 5,000 spectators. Apart from this, attractions of the planned sports city included shopping mall and multiplex as well as all required amenities for today's modern living.

Construction ceased in 2012-13 following low political fervour.
