= Haldia Refinery =

Oil refinery in West Bengal, India

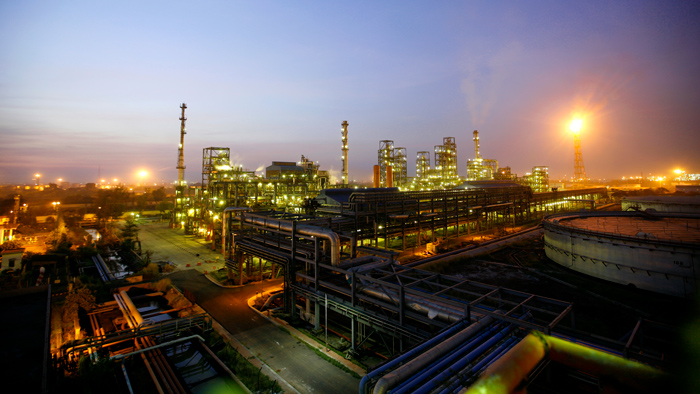
- Evening view of Haldia Refinery

- Location within West Bengal Location within India
- Location: Haldia, West Bengal, India; 22°02′52.9″N 88°06′23.5″E

Refinery details
- Owner: Indian Oil Corporation Limited
- Opened: 1975
- Capacity: 8 MMTPA

Haldia Refinery is an oil refinery operated by Indian Oil Corporation, located in Haldia city in the state of West Bengal. This refinery has a capacity of 8 million tonnes per year. This refinery was commissioned in 1975 and is situated approximately 136 km from Kolkata, at the junction of Haldi and Hooghly River. This refinery can produce various fuel products like LPG, Naphtha, Petrol, Mineral Turpentine Oil, Superior Kerosene, Aviation Turbine Fuel, High Speed Diesel, Jute Batching Oil.

== History ==
Two sectors were commissioned in January 1975 for processing 2.5 MMTPA of Middle East crude - one for producing fuel products and the other for Lube base stocks. The fuel sector was built with French collaboration and the Lube sector with Romanian collaboration. The refining capacity of the Refinery was increased to 2.75 million tonnes per year in 1989 through debottlenecking measures.

== Accident ==
On 21 December 2021, a flash fire took place at the Motor Spirit Quality unit of the refinery, which was under maintenance. Sparks from a welding operation ignited a flammable material, leading to an explosion and fire, which resulted in the deaths of 3 workers and injuring 44 others.
