= Keleghai River =

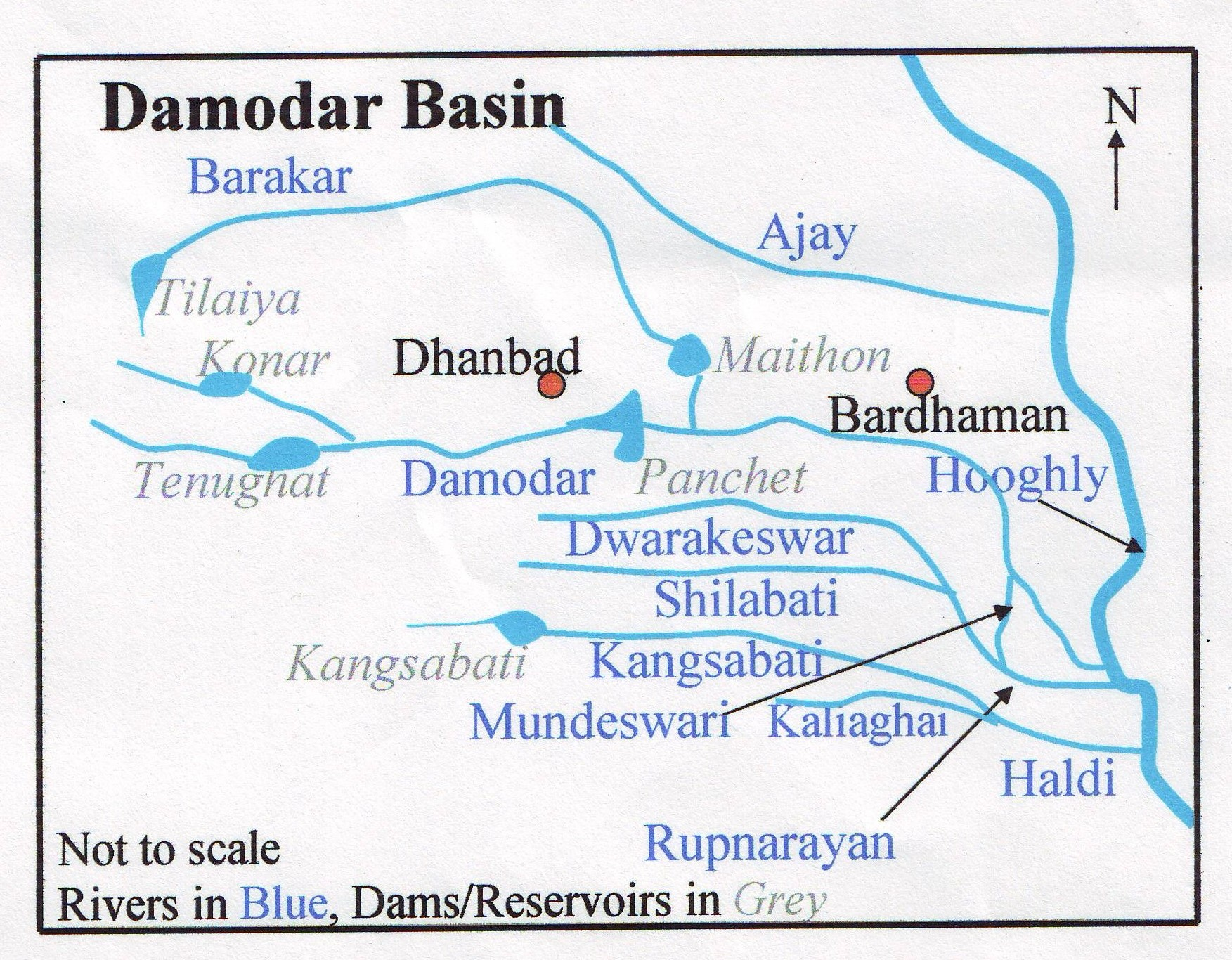

Location
- Country: India
- State: West Bengal

Physical characteristics
- Source
  - location: Baminigram, Jhargram District, Sankrail PS, West Bengal, India
- Length: 121 km (75 mi)
- Discharge
  - location: Kasai

Keleghai River originates at Baminigram, near Dudhkundi, under Sankrail police station of Jhargram district in the Indian state of West Bengal. It flows past Keshiari, Narayangarh, Sabang and Patashpur to join the Kangsabati at Dheu bhanga under Moyna police station of Purba Medinipur district. The combined stream is called Haldi. It is 121 kilometres (75 mi) long. The steep slope of the river in Guptamani and Sankrail causes floods. The river has been so named by the Lodhas.

== See also ==
- List of rivers of India
- Rivers of India
