= Hooghly industrial region =

Industrial belt in India

Hooghly Industrial Belt
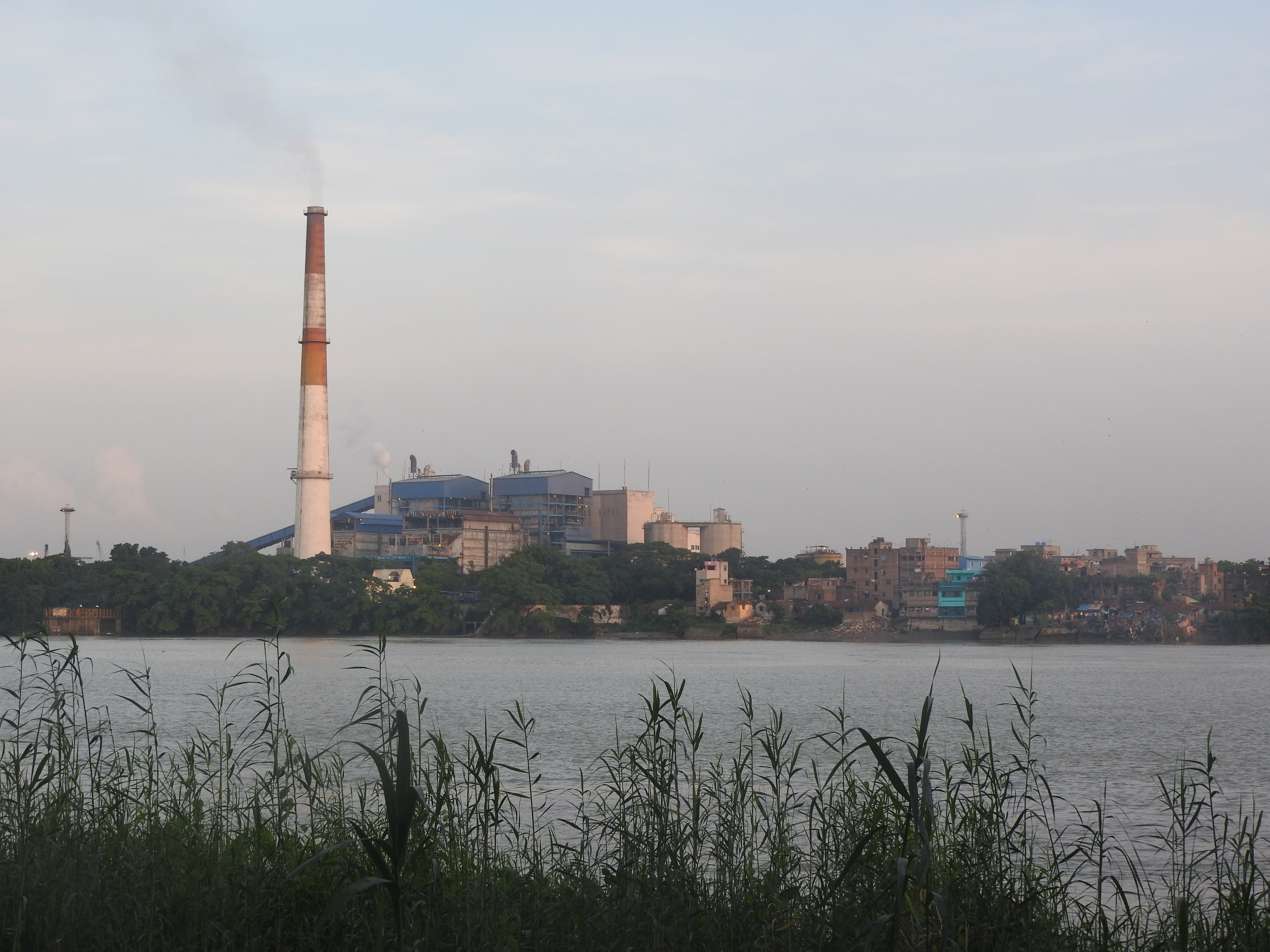
- Nickname: Kolkata Industrial Belt
- Main Industry: Jute; Textile; Heavy engineering; Leather; Information Technology
- Cities: Kolkata; Howrah; Kalyani; Haldia

Area
  - Total: 2,000 km^{2} (770 sq mi)

The Hooghly Industrial Belt also known as the Kolkata Industrial Belt, is India's oldest and second-largest industrial area (Silpancalasilpancalati) on the banks of the Hooghly River from the north to the south of Triveni-Kalyani, Uluberia-Biralapura a 100 km long and 15–10 km wide zone for the industrial development of the Kolkata district and some parts of North 24 Parganas, South 24 Parganas, Nadia, Hooghly district and Howrah district.

The industrial belt had 8,746 registered large factories in 1989. Besides 33,749 registered small factories in 1990. Of the total 2 million industrial workers, 1.27 million are engaged in transport and tertiary services, 240,000 are in the jute industry, and 220,000 are in the engineering and cotton textile industries. On the basis of the value of industrial output, transport and tertiary industry comes on the top (₹1.327 billion), followed by jute manufacturing (₹1.323 billion), manufacturing (₹950 million), chemicals (₹542 million), iron and steel (₹444 million), non-jute textiles (₹255 million), and food products (₹168 million).

== Main industries ==
=== Jute industry ===
The main industry is the jute industry of the Hooghly industrial area. The first jute mill of the country was established in this region. Currently, there are 60 jute mills in this industrial area. 74 percent of the total jute mills in India are located here. The jute mills are mainly developed in Budge Budge, Birkhalur, Uluberia, Sankrail, Titagarh, Jagaddal, Kankinara, Bhadreswar, Agarpara, and Bali areas have been developed. Most jute mills are in the Titagarh, Uluberia, Bali, and Bawajj areas. Jute of the low Ganges valley, Coal of Raniganj, Hooghly river water, CESC and WBSEB power, and local cheap workers. Industry has been helpful.

=== Textile or artificial weaving industry ===
There are about 40 pieces of textile in the Hughli industrial area. This call is available in Gulhahora, Sodapur, Kakinara, Belaghariya, Shayamnagar, and Panihati Uthcheei, in huge demand in the region, South India, and West India. Amadanakrta cotton has helped to develop local capital funds in this textile mill.

=== Heavy engineering industry ===
Heavy engineering is one of the most important industries in the Hoogly industrial area. The heavy engineering industries of this industrial area-

- Construction of motor vehicles – Hindustan Motors Limited (Hindmotor) (Closed), Zaneti (Chinsura)
- Shipbuilding Factory- Garden Reach Shipbuilders & Engineers (Garden Reach)
- Cranes, wagons, rail coaches, and weaving industries: Construction of the building is done by JSP and Company Limited (Dumdum), Textile Machinery Corp Ltd (Behala), Braithwaite and Company Limited (Howrah), Burn Standard Company Limited (Howrah)
- Electric Fan and Sewing Cloth – Usha Company (Tollygunge)
- Railway Engine Repair Factory—Lilua and Kanchrapara

=== Paper industry ===
The paper industry is used as the raw material of the industrial area of Bamboo and sabaighas' in Jharkhand and Chhattisgarh.This paper is mainly made of writing paper and tissue paper in the factories. The factories are –

- Emami Paper Mills (Dakshineswar)
- Tribeni Tissues Limited (Tribeni) – Under ITC.

=== Chemical industry ===
In Kolkata and adjoining areas, chemical industries have been established. They mainly produce coastal soda, sulfuric acid, and soda as well. They also make colored polythene plastic medicines. Principal factory-

- Bengal Chemical (Panihati),
- Dez Medical (Calcutta).
- Alkalie and Chemical Corporation of India Limited (RISHA), under ICI.<3

=== Leather industry ===
The leather industry has been set up in the Banatola's Kolkata Leather Complex and Botanagar in Badajnagar. The Tannery and Tiljala have been shifted to Bantalaya. The Booth company of Batangarh is famous for its shoes. Currently there is a shoe factory in Bantalay.

=== IT industry ===
IT industry has a total of 100 IT companies in the industry. The eligible companies are – RS Software, CCS, Globusin Technology etc. The Software Technology Park in Salt Lake has been developed.

=== Other industry ===
Other industries are:

- Cement Construction – Dankuni
- Wrestling Construction Industry – Kashipur, Dumdum and Ichapur
- Yarn Factory – Kalyani
- Aluminum Factory – Belur
- Rubber Factories – Dunlop,
- Lilium and Calcium Carbide Factories – Beerlapur
- Jewellery Industry – Masonry, Salt Lake.
