= Haldi River =

Coordinates: 22°02′N 88°04′E

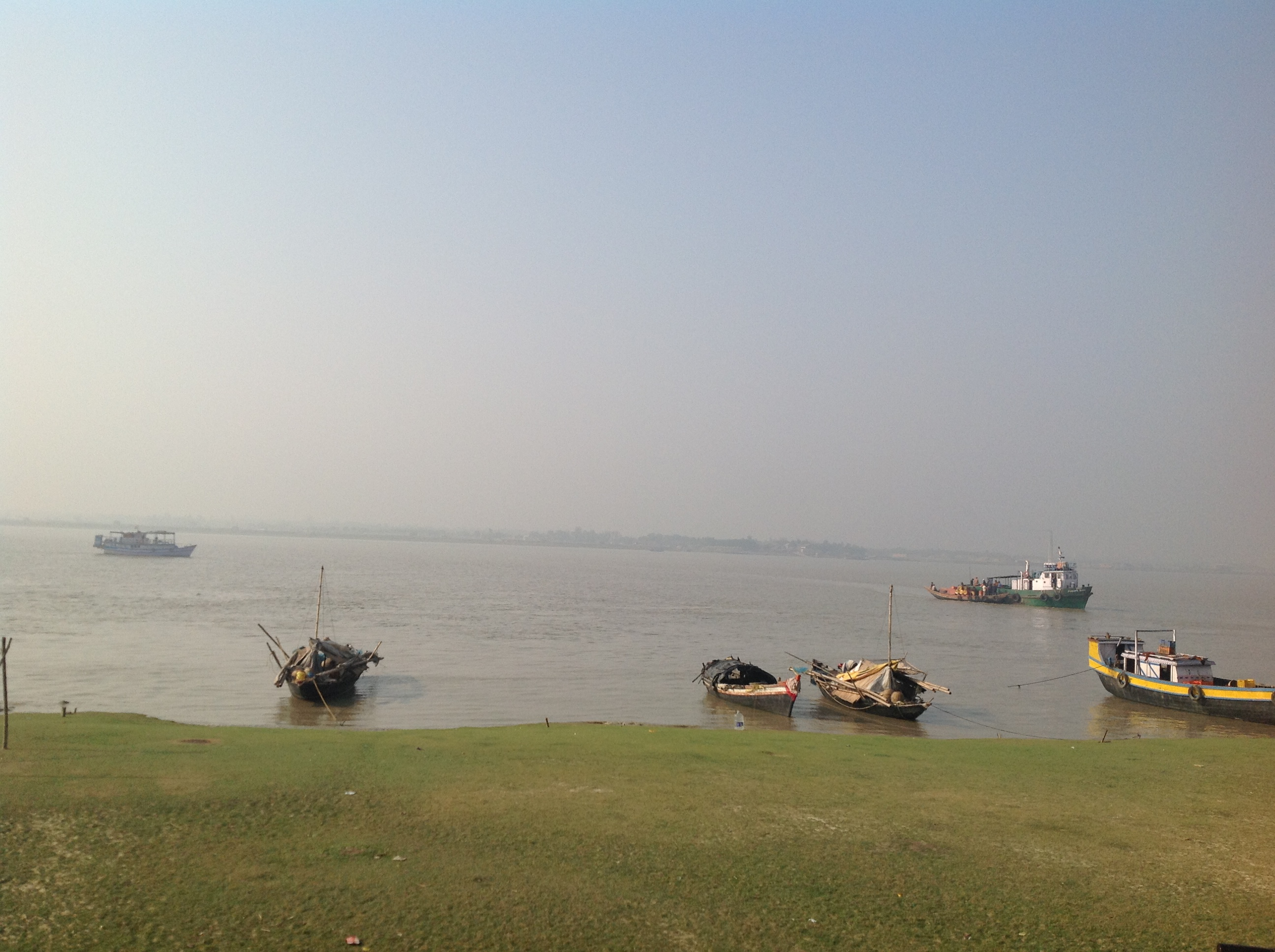

Location
- Country: India
- State: West Bengal

Physical characteristics
- Source: Kansai and Keleghai
  - location: Tangrakhali
- Length: 24 km (15 mi)
- Discharge
  - location: Hooghly

The Haldi is a tributary of Hooghly River flowing through Purba Medinipur district of the Indian state of West Bengal. The Keleghai joins the Kansai at Tangrakhali under Nandakumar Police Station in Tamluk subdivision. The combined stream is called Haldi River. At 24 kilometres (15 mi) long, the Haldi is the last major river to flow into the Hooghly before the latter flows into the sea. The Haldi joins the Hooghly at the industrial town of Haldia.

== See also ==
- List of rivers of India
- Rivers of India
