= Mukutmanipur =

- Village
- Location in West Bengal, India Mukutmanipur (India)
- Coordinates: 22.9495810°N 86.8046520°E
- Country: India
- State: West Bengal
- District: Bankura

Population (2011)
  - Total: 447

Languages*
  - Official: Bengali, Santali, English
- Time zone: UTC+5:30 (IST)
- Postal code: 722135
- Vehicle registration: WB
- Website: wb.gov.in

Mukutmanipur is a village in Bankura district of West Bengal, India. It is located at the confluence of the Kangsabati and Kumari rivers close to the Jharkhand border.

== Geography ==
Places in Khatra subdivision in Bankura district
CT: census town, R: rural/ urban centre, C: craft centre, T: ancient/ temple centre
Owing to space constraints in the small map, the actual locations in a larger map may vary slightly

=== Area overview ===
The map alongside shows the Khatra subdivision of Bankura district. Physiographically, this area is having uneven lands with hard rocks. In the Khatra CD block area there are some low hills. The Kangsabati project reservoir is prominently visible in the map. The subdued patches of shaded area in the map show forested areas It is an almost fully rural area.

Note: The map alongside presents some of the notable locations in the subdivision. All places marked in the map are linked in the larger full screen map.

=== Kangsabati project ===
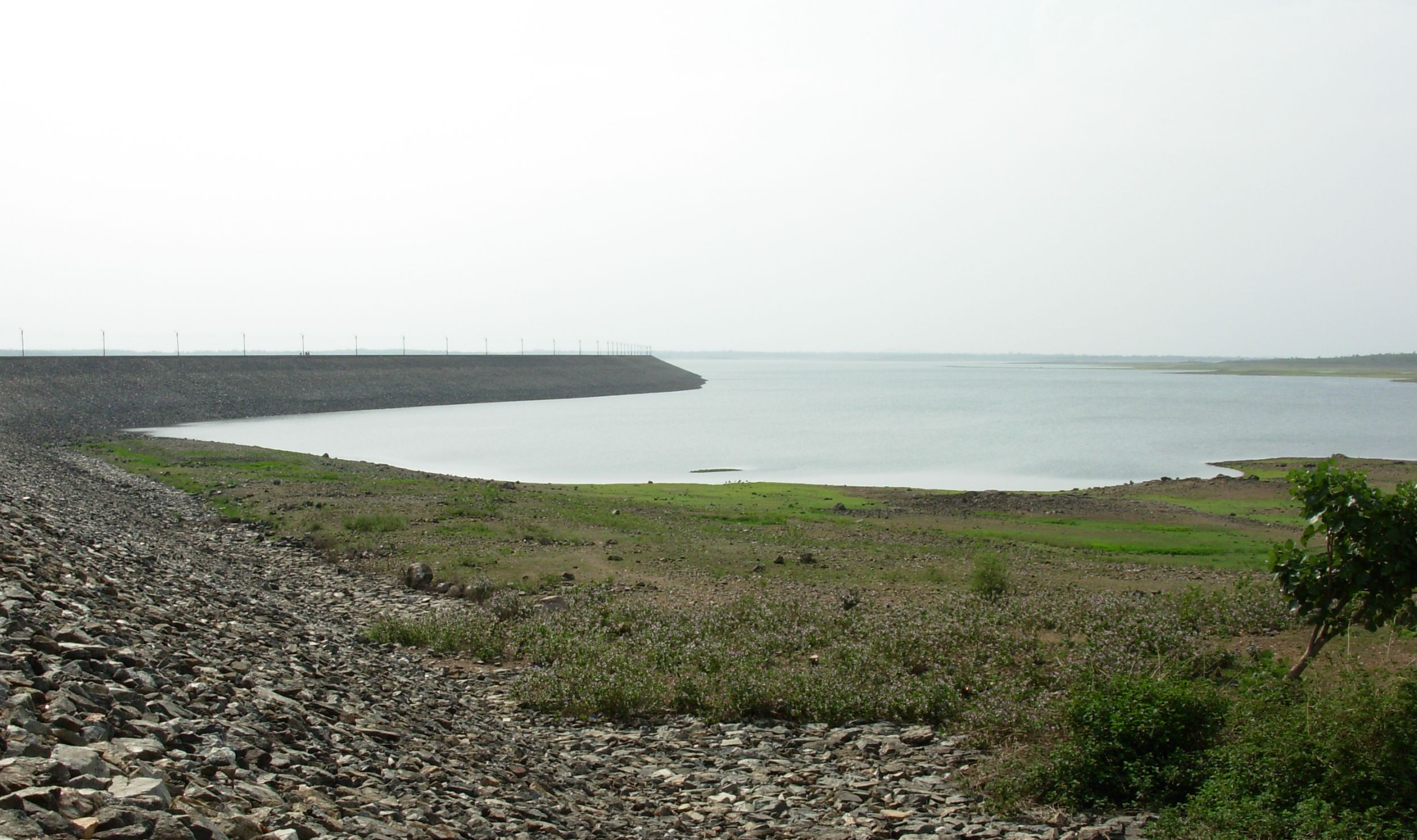
Mukutmanipur Dam

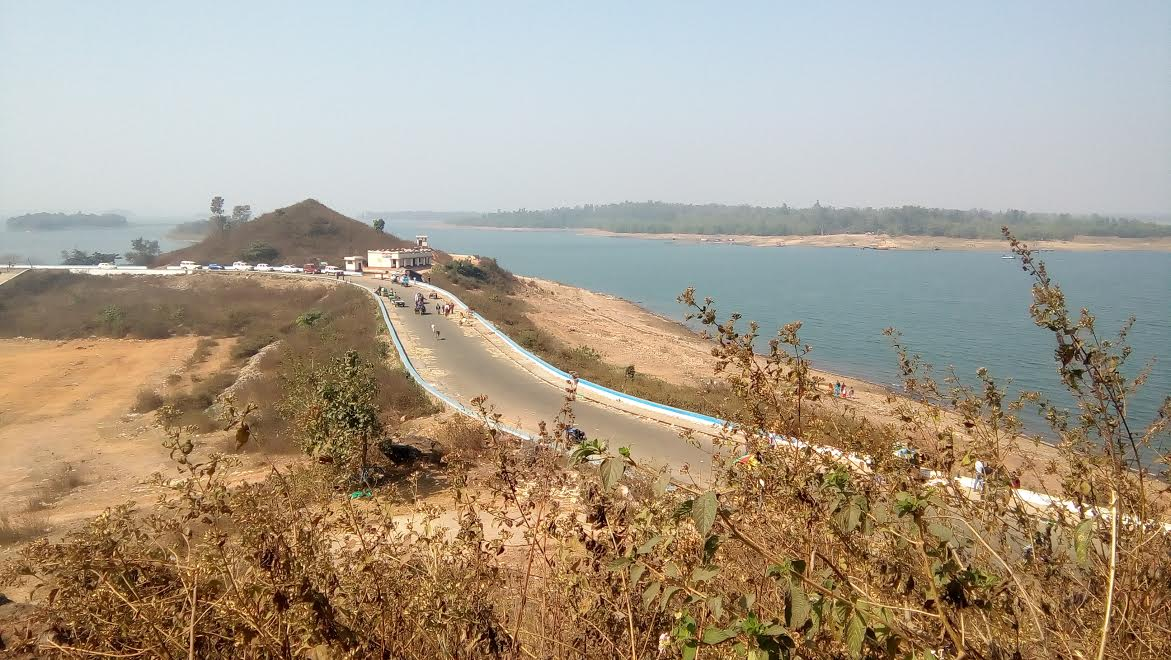
Mukutmanipur Dam

In 1956, a giant water dam reservoir was planned at Mukutmanipur, [about 12 km from Khatra town in the district of Bankura, WB], under a big vision mooted by the then CM of Bengal Dr Bidhan Ch. Roy. The Mukutmanipur dam was planned to provide major irrigation facilities to 8,000 square kilometres of agricultural land, stretched across Bankura, Purulia, Paschim Medinipur and parts of upper Hooghly. Approximately two kilometres from the lake is the Bangopalpur Reserve Forest, a home of many species of flora and fauna.

=== Notable attractions ===
Approximately two kilometers from the lake is the Bangopalpur Reserve Forest, a home of many species of flora and fauna. Four kilometres from the dam is the ancient town of Ambikanagar, once an important place of pilgrimage for Jains. However, a flood destroyed most of what remained in 1898.

Mukutmanipur is home to a 10.8 km-long man-made mud-banked fresh water barrage. It canalises Kangshabati and Kumari rivers into the three drought affected districts of Bankura, Purulia and Midnapore for irrigation in the summer months.

== Demographics ==
As per 2011 Census of India Mukutmanipur had a total population of 447 of which 240 (54%) were males and 207 (46%) were females. Population below 6 years was 40. The total number of literates in Mukutmanipur was 328 (80.59% of the population over 6 years).

.*For language details see Khatra (community development block)#Language and religion

== Transport ==
The Union Railway Minister laid the foundation stone of the new 47 km Bankura-Chhatna-Mukutmanipur line in 2005.
