= Haldia =

Industrial Port City in West Bengal, India

- Metropolis
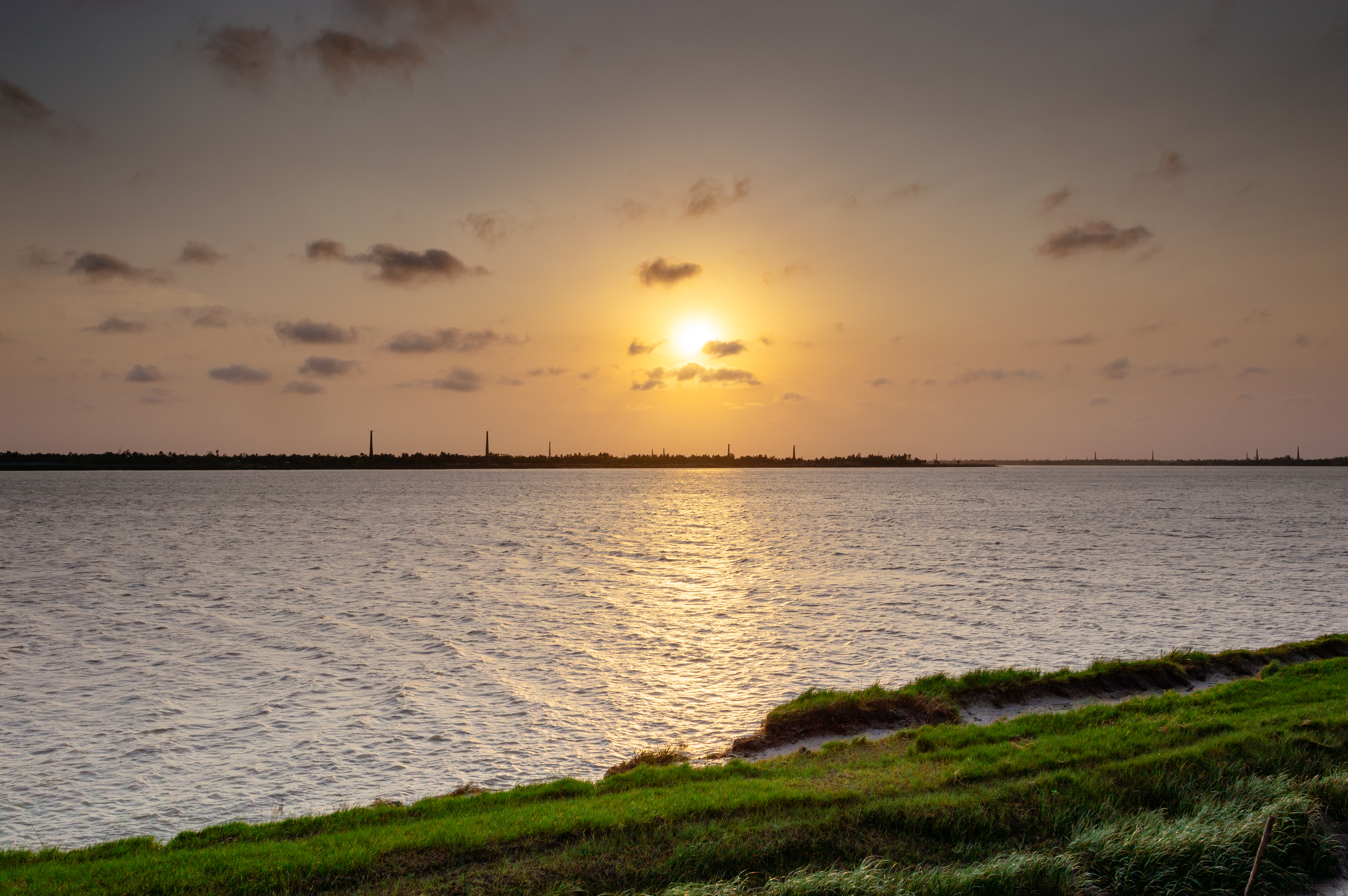
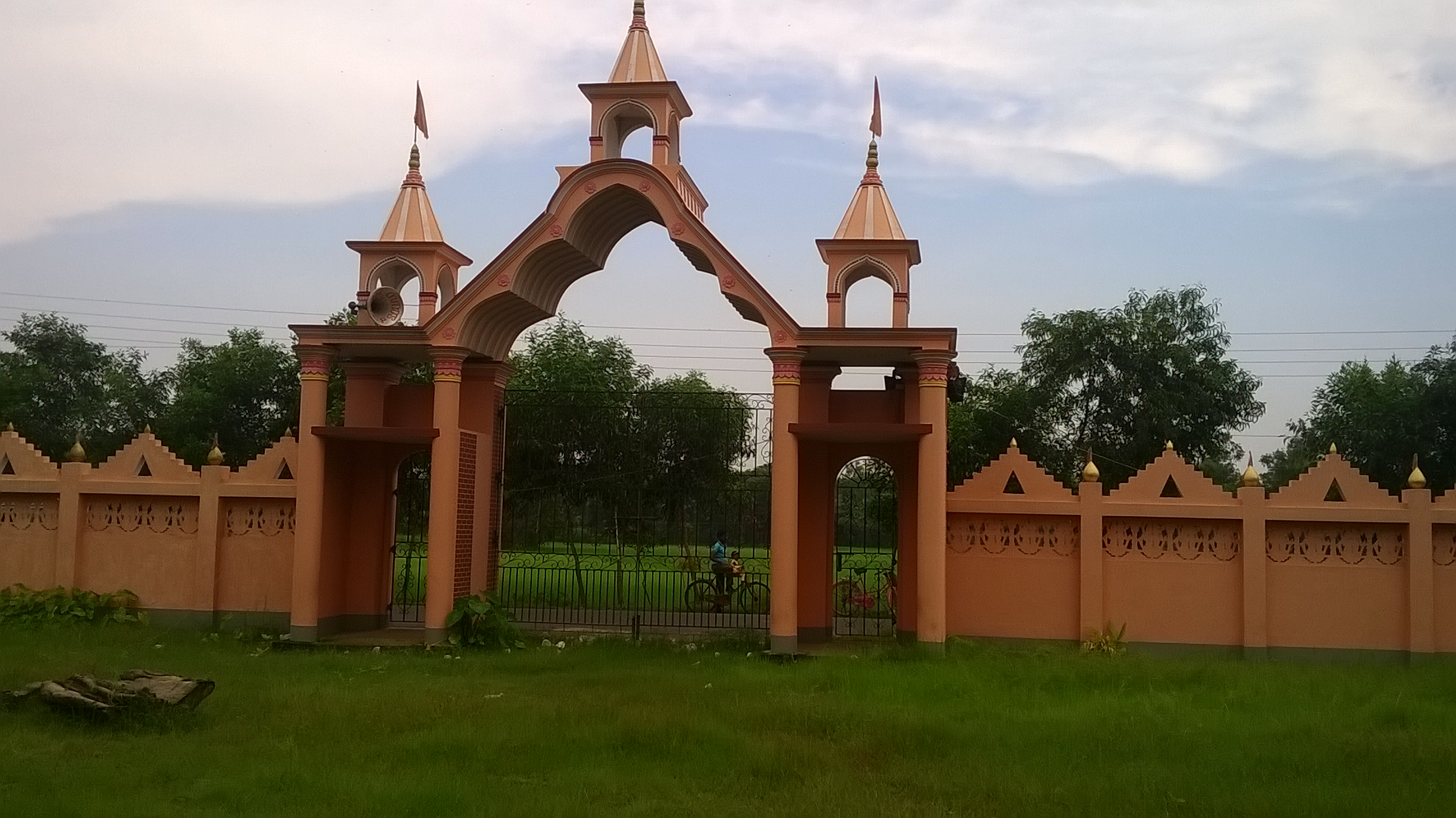
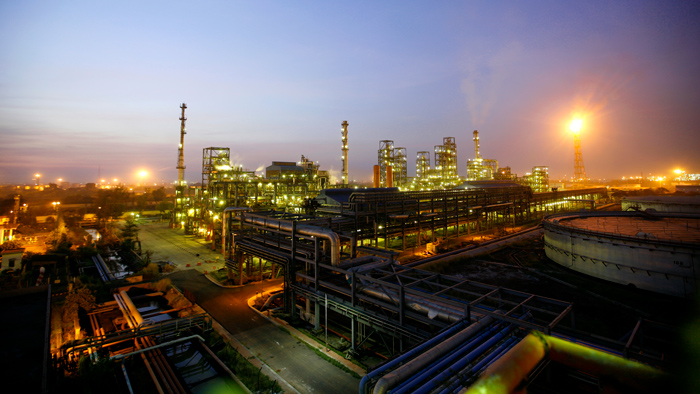
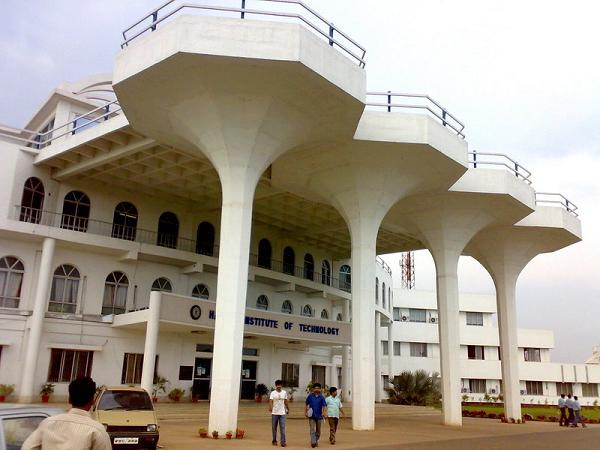
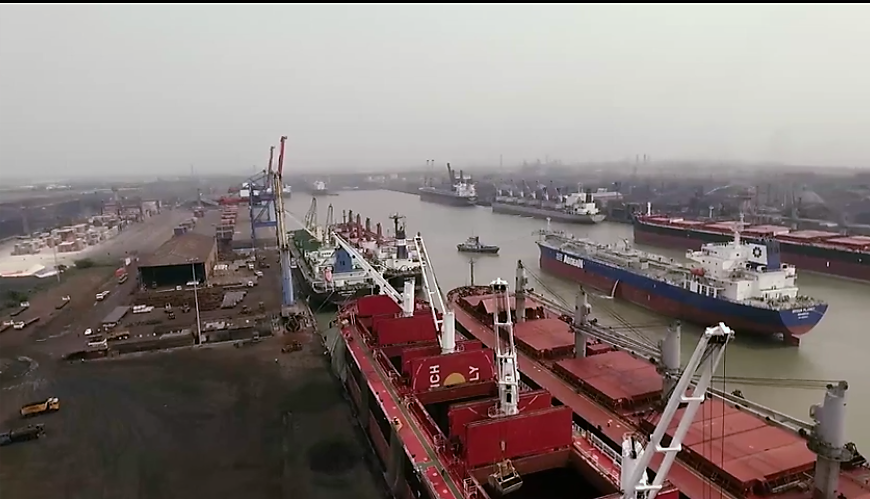
- Sunset on the Banks of Haldi River Gouranga Dham Temple Haldia Refinery under IOCL 4 pillar spot, Haldia Institute of Technology Haldia Port
- Nickname: Petrochemical City
- Location within West Bengal Location within India
- Coordinates: 22.0667°N 88.0698°E
- Country: India
- State: West Bengal
- District: Purba Medinipur

Government
  - Type: Municipality
  - Body: Haldia Municipality; Haldia Development Authority

Area
  - Metropolis: 110 km^{2} (42 sq mi)
  - Metro: 1,982 km^{2} (765 sq mi)

Population (2011)
  - Metropolis: 200,762
  - Metro: 2,749,364

Haldia (Bengali: [ɦɔld̪ija]) is an industrial port city in Purba Medinipur district in the Indian state of West Bengal. It has a major sea port and industrial belt located approximately 124 km (77 mi) southwest of Kolkata near the mouth of the Hooghly River, one of the distributaries of the Ganges. The Haldia Township is bordered by the Haldi River, an offshoot of the Ganges River. Haldia is a centre for petrochemical businesses, and is a major trade port for Kolkata.

== History ==
The history of Haldia city is closely associated with the Calcutta Port, officially commissioned in 1870 under the Calcutta Port Act. It has its roots in the Mughal Emperor Aurangzeb's granting of trading privileges to the British. Following independence, the port began to cater to Indian business interests. Haldia was selected as the location for an additional port close to Calcutta, in part for supplying crude oil to the Barauni refinery via a riverside pier, as India's industrialization and marine trade volumes increased due to capacity restrictions and growing costs. As a result, the Haldia Dock Complex was created, which drew significant Indian and international corporations, such as IOCL, Exide, Shaw Wallace, Tata Chemicals, Haldia Petrochemicals, and Hindustan Lever, to build the Haldia Industrial Complex.

== Geography ==
Cities and towns in Haldia subdivision of Purba Medinipur district
M: municipal city/ town, CT: census town, R: rural/ urban centre, S: port
Owing to space constraints in the small map, the actual locations in a larger map may vary slightly

=== Location ===
Haldia is located at 22.03°N 88.06°E. It has an average elevation of 8 metres (26 ft) above sea level.

== Demographics ==
As of 2011 census, Haldia had a population of 200,762, out of which 104,852 were males and 95,910 were females. The 0–6 years population was 21,122. Effective literacy rate for the 7+ population was 89.06 per cent.

As of 2001 India census, Haldia had a population of 170,695. Males constitute 53% of the population and females 47%. In Haldia, 13% of the population is under 6 years of age.

Languages spoken in Haldia (Municipality) (2011)
1. Bengali (96.3%)
2. Hindi (2.50%)
3. Santali (0.37%)
4. Odia (0.26%)
5. Telugu (0.12%)
6. Others (0.41%)

=== Japanese community ===
Haldia once had a small, thriving Japanese community. The Japanese community of Haldia were mostly engineers and top executives at the Mitsubishi Chemical Corporation purified terephthalic acid (the corporation's majority stake is now under The Chatterjee Group) plant in the city. The community had lived in the mini Japanese township called Sataku (Japantown) for many years. Sataku had Japanese restaurant and a local Japanese news station. Japanese movies were shown in local theatres in the township. Haldia was the only Indian city to have a Japantown.

== Administration ==
The city of Haldia is governed by the Haldia Municipality. It was constituted on June 9,1997, constituted under the provisions of the West Bengal Municipal Act of 1993. Earlier Haldia Municipality had 26 wards. In 2015, the number of wards was increased to 29. The Executive Officer of the Municipality is Shri Krishna Nirmalya Bhattacharya (W.B.C.S. Exe.). The Municipality has the following departments: General Administration, Assessment Department, Property Tax Department, Trade License Department, Estate Department, Finance Department, Public Works Department, State Government And Central Government Mandate, Transport Department, IT Department, Health Department, Park And Garden Department, Conservancy and Sanitation Department, Grievance Cell and Education.

Haldia Municipality falls under the jurisdiction of two police territories, served by Haldia and Bhabanipur police stations. Haldia police station is located in Chinranjibpur, and covers an area of 98 km^{2} (38 sq mi) with a population of 65,000. Bhabanipur police station is located in Bhabanipur, and covers an area of 115 km^{2} (44 sq mi) with a population of 124,906.

Haldia is also a base of the Indian Coast Guard. Indian coast guard DHQ 8 (Headquarters for West Bengal) is located at Haldia. There is a hoverport to house four of the eighteen hovercraft belonging to the Indian Coast Guard. The Indian coast guard also has a pontoon jetty to berth a fleet of ships. Presently two fast patrol vessels, one inshore patrol vessels, and one small craft are based at Haldia.

== Climate ==
Haldia has a tropical savanna climate (Köppen climate classification Aw), with winter temperatures ranging from a low of around 7 °C (45 °F) degrees Celsius to a high of 22 °C (72 °F). Summers can be very hot and humid. Usual summer temperatures in May, the hottest month, range from a low of 24 °C (75 °F) degrees to highs around 39 °C (102 °F) degrees. Although summers are hot and humid, Kalbaishakhis provide a relief to the people, albeit killing some in the process. Rainfall is heavy during monsoons, with an average rainfall of 3,650 mm (144 in) and the rainy months are between May and October.

Climate data for Haldia (1991–2020, extremes 1981–2020)
Month	Jan	Feb	Mar	Apr	May	Jun	Jul	Aug	Sep	Oct	Nov	Dec	Year
Record high °C (°F)	32.3 (90.1)	37.7 (99.9)	39.5 (103.1)	40.5 (104.9)	40.9 (105.6)	39.9 (103.8)	38.2 (100.8)	39.0 (102.2)	36.3 (97.3)	36.9 (98.4)	35.5 (95.9)	32.0 (89.6)	40.9 (105.6)
Mean daily maximum °C (°F)	25.7 (78.3)	29.0 (84.2)	32.3 (90.1)	33.5 (92.3)	34.0 (93.2)	33.4 (92.1)	32.0 (89.6)	32.2 (90.0)	32.4 (90.3)	32.1 (89.8)	30.0 (86.0)	27.0 (80.6)	31.1 (88.0)
Mean daily minimum °C (°F)	14.5 (58.1)	18.7 (65.7)	23.1 (73.6)	25.9 (78.6)	27.1 (80.8)	27.5 (81.5)	26.9 (80.4)	26.8 (80.2)	26.6 (79.9)	24.9 (76.8)	20.4 (68.7)	15.7 (60.3)	23.2 (73.8)
Record low °C (°F)	8.4 (47.1)	10.4 (50.7)	15.7 (60.3)	18.3 (64.9)	19.1 (66.4)	21.0 (69.8)	22.3 (72.1)	22.0 (71.6)	22.0 (71.6)	19.3 (66.7)	12.5 (54.5)	10.0 (50.0)	8.4 (47.1)
Average rainfall mm (inches)	18.6 (0.73)	21.0 (0.83)	30.1 (1.19)	51.8 (2.04)	116.2 (4.57)	279.7 (11.01)	404.9 (15.94)	397.2 (15.64)	333.2 (13.12)	169.2 (6.66)	38.8 (1.53)	7.8 (0.31)	1,868.5 (73.56)
Average rainy days	1.1	1.1	1.5	3.1	6.5	11.8	18.5	18.1	13.6	6.7	1.6	0.7	84.2
Average relative humidity (%) (at 17:30 IST)	64	64	67	77	79	83	85	85	84	79	71	67	75
Source: India Meteorological Department

Haldia has been ranked 5th best "National Clean Air City" under (Category 3 population under 3 lakhs cities) in India.

== Transportation ==
=== Road-way ===
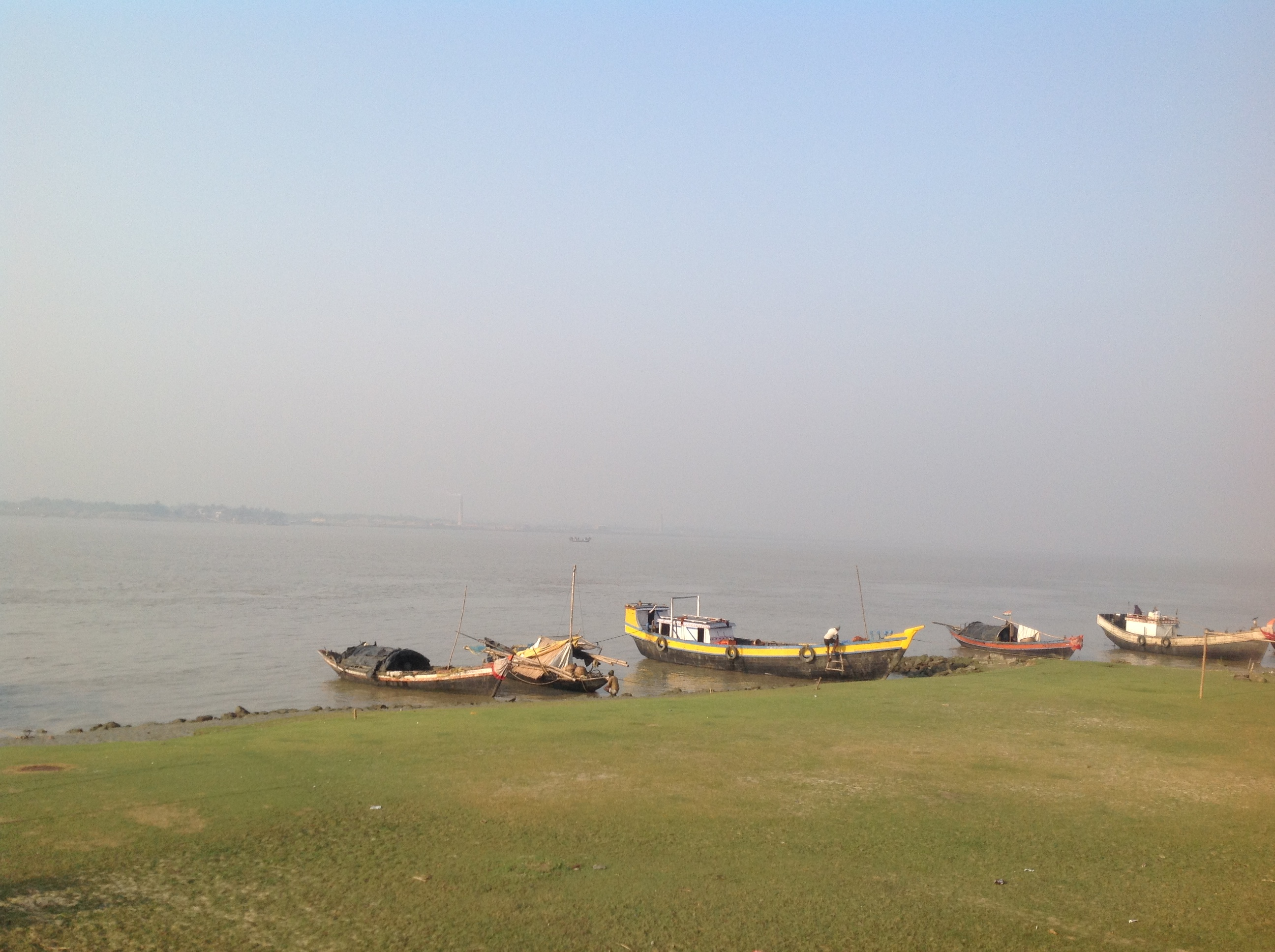
Haldi River, Haldia

Haldia is connected to Kolkata by bus of South Bengal State Transport Corporation . Recent efforts have seen introduction of new air-conditioned buses which take less than three hours from station to station.. Haldia is also connected to Bankura, Kharagpur, Tamluk, Midnapore, Kolaghat, Jhargram, Nabadwip, Kalyani, Arambagh, Durgapur, Tarakeswar, Burdwan, Asansol by direct bus. Haldia is 30km away from District headquarters Tamluk, 120km away from Kolkata and 110km away from Kharagpur by road. The NH116 highway passes through the City.

=== Rail-way ===
Haldia railway station is the major railway station on Panskura-Tamluk-Haldia Line connecting the city to Kolkata, Tamluk, Kharagpur, Asansol, Bankura and Delhi. For long-distance trains, except one or two weekly for Delhi, you have to go to either Mecheda, Howrah(near Kolkata) or Kharagpur.

=== Water-way ===
Haldia is also connected via the 1,620 km (1,010 mi) long inland waterway, National Waterway 1, that runs from Prayagraj across the Ganges, Bhagirathi and Hooghly river system to Haldia (Sagar). A catamaran service used to operate from Kolkata to Haldia, but was withdrawn due to its high price and unpopularity among tourists. A governmental ferry service operates between Haldia and Nandigram.

== Industry ==
Haldia has several major factories, including South Asian Petrochemicals Ltd, Haldia Refinery under IOCL, Haldia Energy Limited, Exide, Shaw Wallace, Tata Chemicals, Haldia Petrochemicals, India Power Corporation Ltd., Hindustan Lever, MCPI Private Limited (formerly Mitsubishi Chemical Corporations India), S.J.Constructions, Jay Road Carriers and LTC&Co.

== Sports ==
The Indian Football Association and Tata Football Academy have been operating for years in the city to scout and promote football talents. A new project called Haldia International Sports City is also under construction.

Cricket is a popular sport in Haldia with multiple coaching clubs and local facilities available for the youth and teenagers to train, and compete at local and regional level cricket tournaments. Haldia also has multiple football coaching clubs. The city has a few public and private wooden floor badminton courts and swimming pools- people come from various places to have their coaching in these arenas.

== Places of Interest ==
There are a few places to visit in and around Haldia which are historically significant for the area.

- Mahishadal Rajbari
- Gopaljew Temple
- Dubey Palace
- Kapal Kundala Temple
- Vivekananda Mission Asram Muktidham
