= Kacheguda–Bhagat Ki Kothi Express =

Train in India

Kacheguda-Bhagat Ki Kothi Express
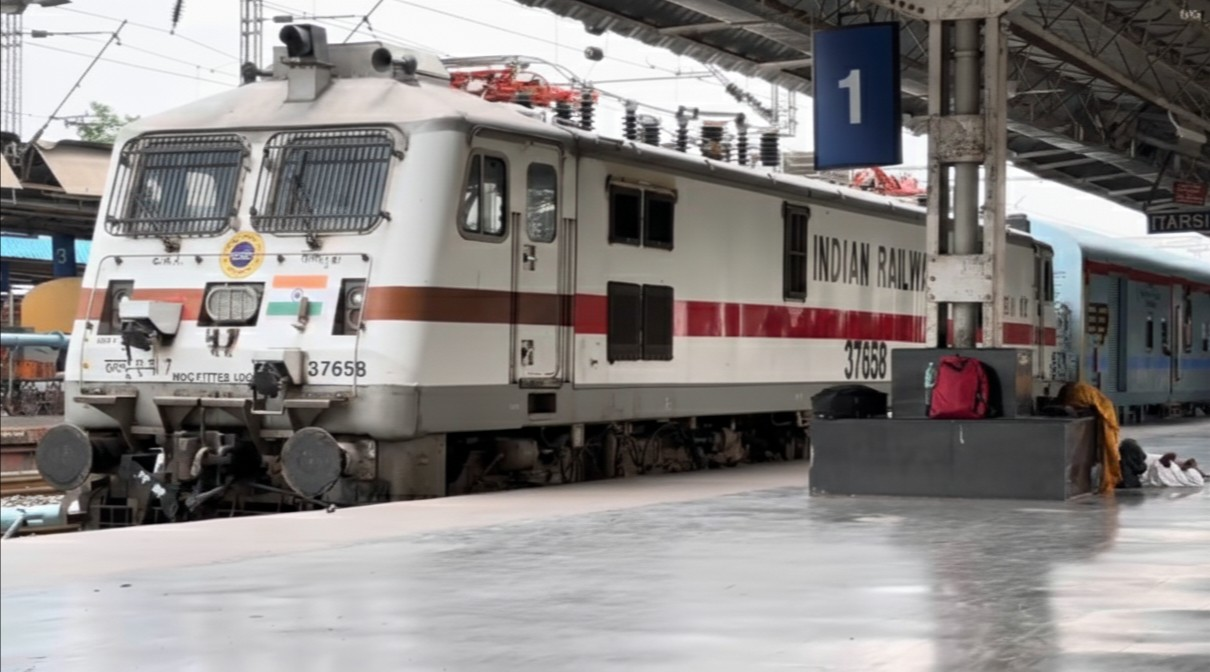
- Kacheguda-Bhagat Ki Kothi Express standing at Itarsi Jn. with Lallaguda based WAP-7 locomotive.

Overview
- Service type: Express
- Locale: Rajasthan, Madhya Pradesh, Maharashtra & Telangana
- First service: 20 July 2025; 11 months ago
- Current operator: South Central (SCR)

Route
- Termini: Kacheguda (KCG); Bhagat Ki Kothi (BGKT)
- Stops: 31
- Distance travelled: 1,949 km (1,211 mi)
- Average journey time: 44 hrs 10 mins
- Service frequency: Daily
- Train number: 17605 / 17606

On-board services
- Classes: General Unreserved, Sleeper Class, AC 2 Tier, AC 3 Tier
- Seating arrangements: Yes
- Sleeping arrangements: Yes
- Catering facilities: On-board Catering
- Observation facilities: Large windows
- Baggage facilities: No
- Other facilities: Below the seats

Technical
- Rolling stock: LHB coach
- Track gauge: 1,676 mm (5 ft 6 in)
- Operating speed: 130 km/h (81 mph) maximum, 44 km/h (27 mph) average including halts.
Route map
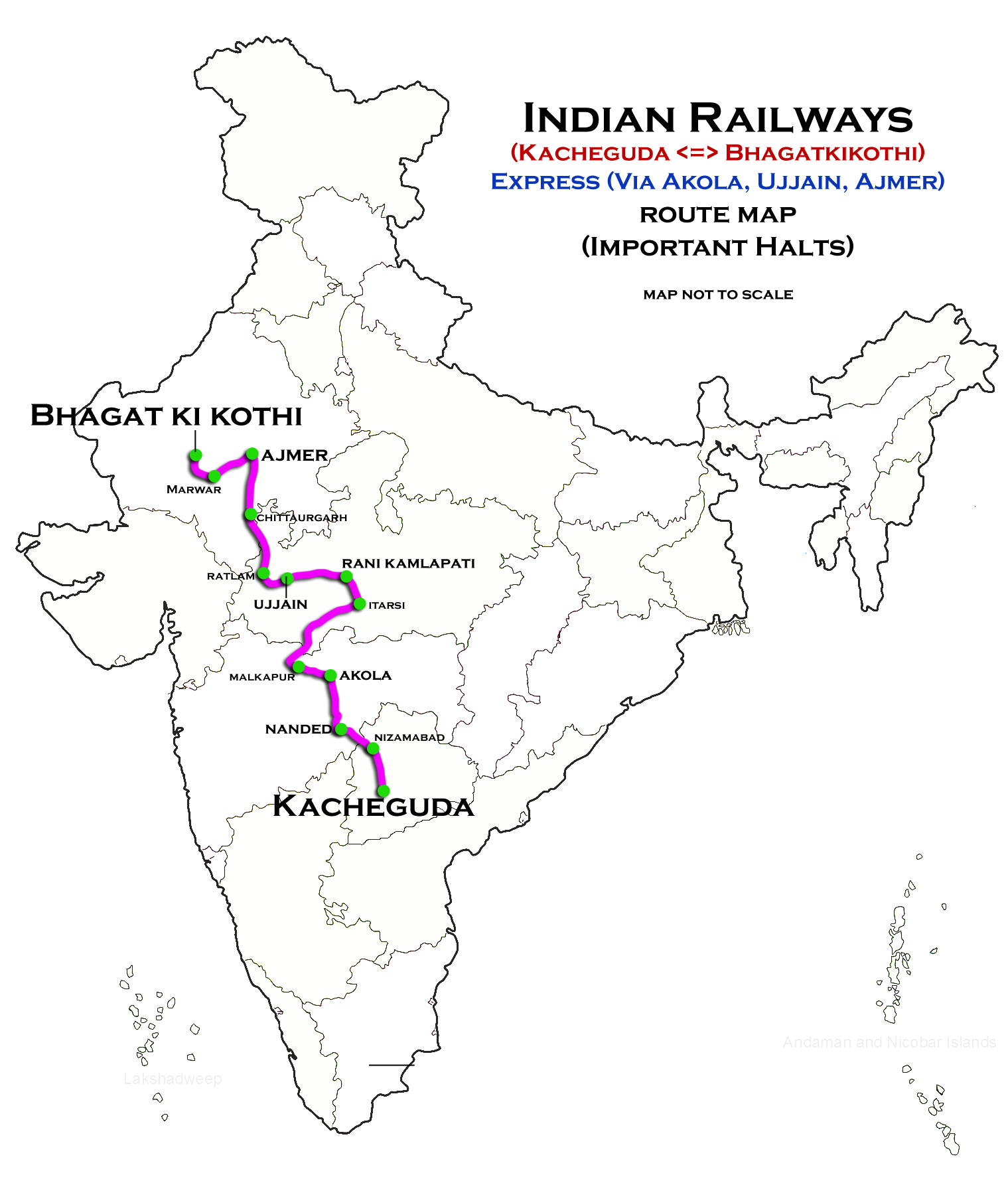

The 17605 / 17606 Kacheguda–Bhagat Ki Kothi Express is an express train belonging to South Central Railway zone that runs between the city Kacheguda of Telangana and Bhagat Ki Kothi of Rajasthan in India.

It operates as train number 17605 from Kacheguda to Bhagat Ki Kothi and as train number 17606 in the reverse direction, serving the states of Rajasthan, Madhya Pradesh, Maharashtra and Telangana.

== Services ==
• 17605/ Kacheguda–Bhagat Ki Kothi Express has an average speed of 44 km/h and covers 1949 km in 44h 10m.

• 17606/ Bhagat Ki Kothi–Kacheguda Express has an average speed of 47 km/h and covers 1949 km in 41h 10m.

== Routes and halts ==
The Important Halts of the train are :

● Kacheguda

● Nizamabad Junction

● Hazur Sahib Nanded

● Purna Junction

● Hingoli Deccan

● Washim

● Akola Junction

● Malkapur

● Burhnapur

● Khandwa Junction

● Itarsi Junction

● Narmadapuram

● Rani Kamalapati

● Sant Hirdaram Nagar

● Sehore

● Maksi Junction

● Ujjain Junction

● Ratlam Junction

● Jaora

● Mandsor

● Neemuch

● Chittaurgarh Junction

● Bhilwara

● Bijainagar

● Nasirabad

● Ajmer Junction

● Beawar

● Sojat Road

● Marwar Junction

● Pali Marwar

● Bhagat Ki Kothi

== Schedule ==
• 17605 - 11:35 PM (Daily) [Kacheguda]

• 17606 - 10:30 PM (Daily) [Bhagat Ki Kothi]

== Coach composition ==
1. General Unreserved - 4
2. Sleeper Class - 7
3. AC 3rd Class - 7
4. AC 2nd Class - 2

== Traction ==
As the entire route is fully electrified it is hauled by a Bhagat Ki Kothi Loco Shed-based WAP-7 electric locomotive from Kacheguda to Bhagat Ki Kothi and vice versa.

== Rake reversal ==
The train will reverse 3 times :

1. Purna Junction
2. Ajmer Junction
3. Marwar Junction

== See also ==
Trains from Kacheguda :

1. Kacheguda—Manmad Ajanta Express
2. Kacheguda–Ashokapuram Express
3. Kacheguda–Yesvantpur Vande Bharat Express
4. Kacheguda–Madurai Weekly Express
5. Venkatadri Express
6. Kacheguda–Nagercoil Weekly Express

Trains from Bhagat Ki Kothi :

1. Bhagat Ki Kothi–Thiruchchirappalli Humsafar Express
2. Bhagat Ki Kothi–Ahmedabad Weekly Express
3. Bhagat Ki Kothi–Bilaspur Express
4. Bhagat Ki Kothi–Bandra Terminus Express (via Bhildi)
5. Bhagat Ki Kothi–Sabarmati Intercity Express

== Notes ==
a. Runs daily in a week with both directions.
