= Kacheguda–Nagercoil Weekly Express =

Train in India

Overview
- Service type: Express
- First service: 21 May 2014; 12 years ago
- Current operator: Southern Railway

Route
- Termini: Kacheguda (KCG); Nagercoil (NCJ)
- Stops: 24
- Distance travelled: 1,496 km (930 mi)
- Average journey time: 29 hrs 10 mins
- Service frequency: Weekly (Note: Runs one day in a week for every direction.)
- Train number: 16353 / 16354

On-board services
- Classes: AC 2 Tier, AC 3 Tier, Sleeper Class, General Unreserved
- Seating arrangements: No
- Sleeping arrangements: Yes
- Catering facilities: On-board catering, E-catering
- Observation facilities: Large windows
- Baggage facilities: No
- Other facilities: Below the seats

Technical
- Rolling stock: LHB coach
- Track gauge: 1,676 mm (5 ft 6 in)
- Operating speed: 51 km/h (32 mph) average including halts.
- Rake maintenance: Nagercoil
Route map
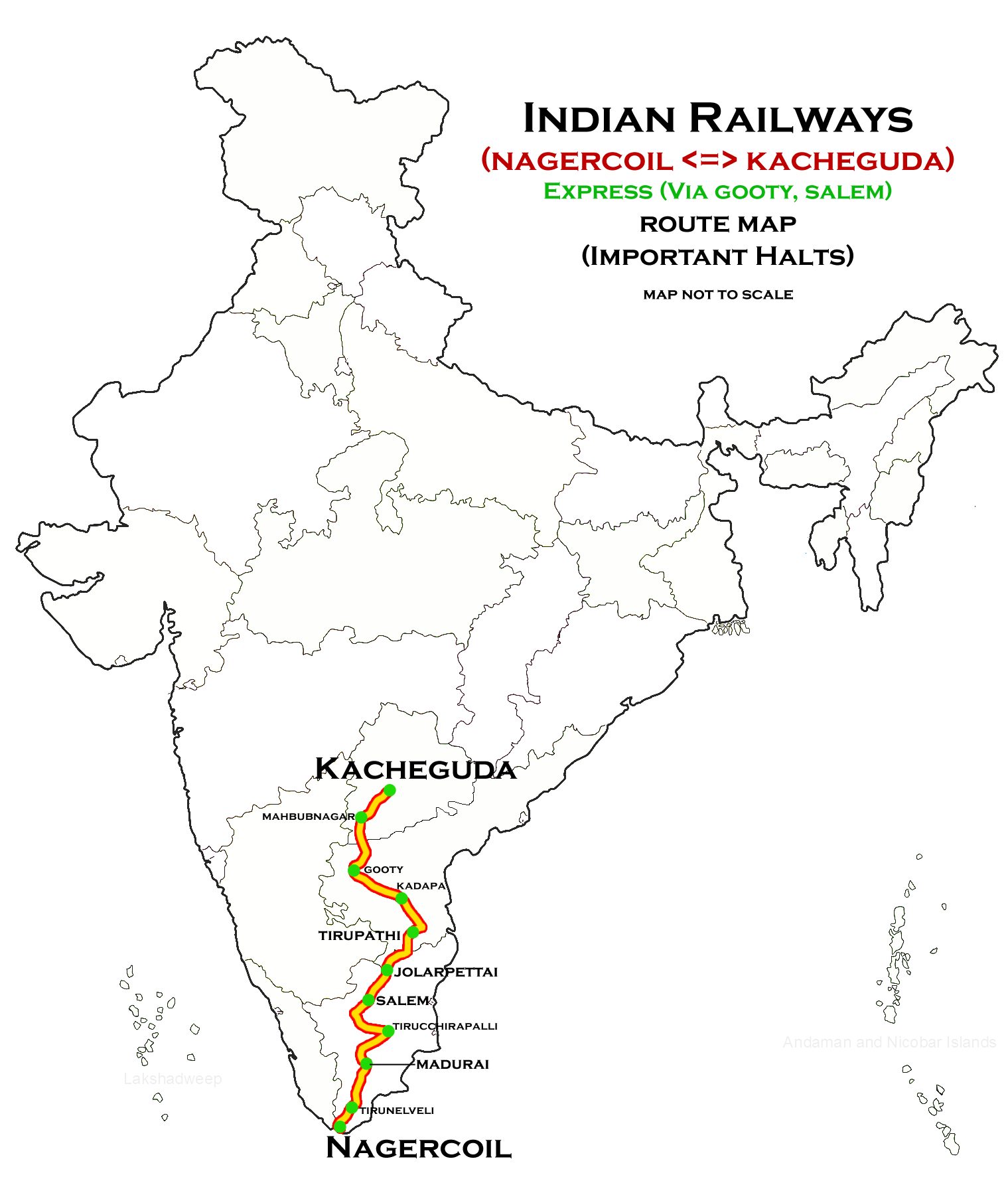

The 16353 / 16354 Kacheguda–Nagercoil Weekly Express is an express train belonging to Southern Railway zone that runs between Kacheguda and Nagercoil Junction in India. It is currently being operated with 16353/16354 train numbers on a weekly basis.

== Service ==
The 16353/Kacheguda–Nagercoil Weekly Express has an average speed of 51 km/h and covers 1496 km in 29h 10m. The 16354/Nagercoil–Kacheguda Weekly Express has an average speed of 50 km/h and covers 1496 km in 29h 50m.

== Route and halts ==
The important halts of the train are:

- Kacheguda
- Mahbubnagar
- Kurnool City
- Dhone Junction
- Gooty Junction
- Kadapa
- Renigunta Junction
- Tirupati
- Chittoor
- Katpadi Junction
- Jolarpettai Junction
- Salem Junction
- Tiruchirappalli Junction
- Dindigul Junction
- Madurai Junction
- Virudhunagar Junction
- Tirunelveli Junction
- Nagercoil Junction

== Coach composition ==
The train has ICF rakes with a maximum speed of110 km/h. The train consists of 20 coaches:

- 1 AC II Tier
- 6 AC III Tier
- 8 Sleeper coaches
- 1 Pantry car
- 3 General Unreserved
- 2 Seating cum Luggage Rake
- 2 High Capacity Parcel Van

== Traction ==
Both trains are hauled by an Erode Loco Shed-based WAP-4 electric locomotive from Kacheguda to Trichy. From Trichy, train is hauled by an Erode Loco Shed-based WDM-3D diesel locomotive until Nagercoil and vice versa.

== See also ==
- Kacheguda railway station
- Nagercoil railway station
- Thirukural Express
