= Kacheguda–Yesvantpur Vande Bharat Express =

Mini Vande Bharat Express train route in India

Kacheguda - Yesvantpur Junction Vande Bharat Express
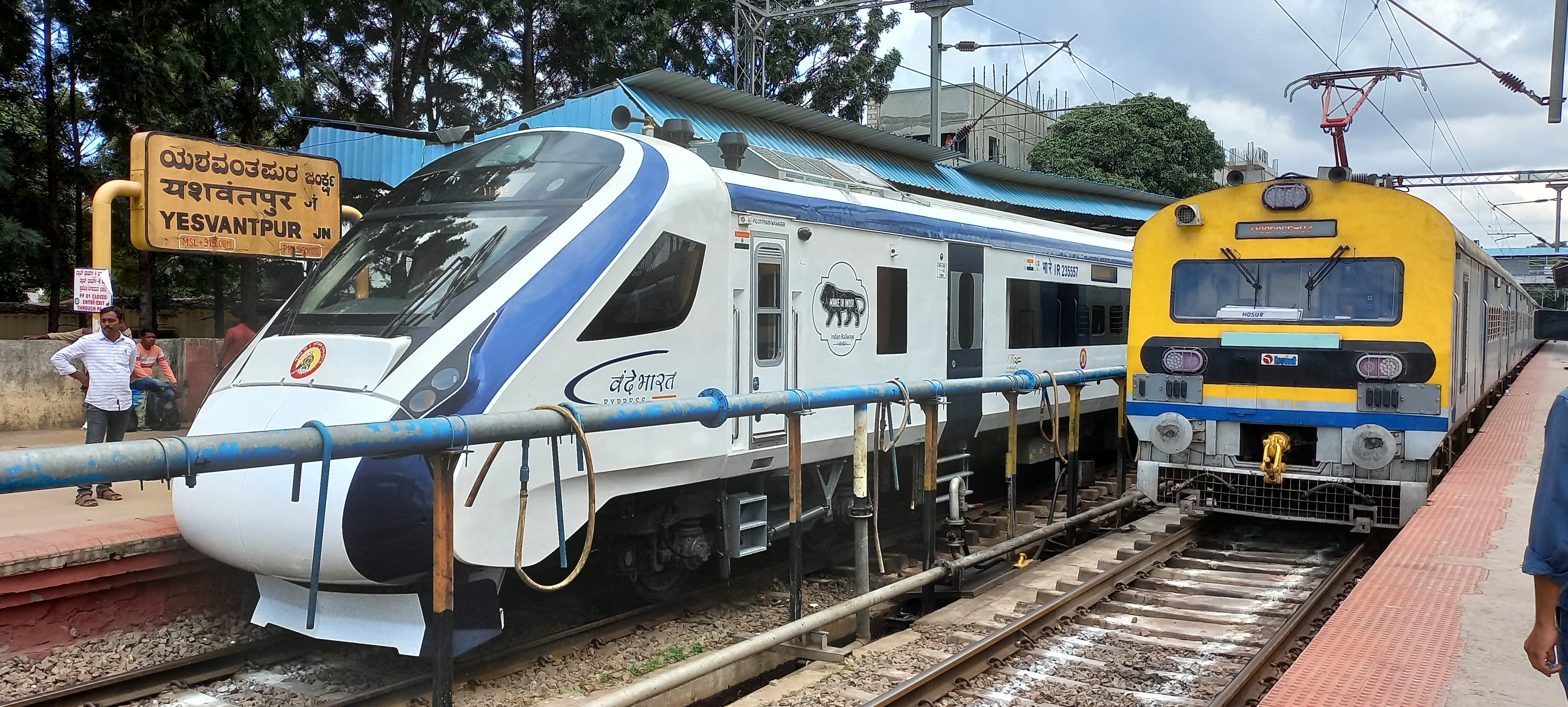
- This Mini Vande Bharat Express train on its first commercial run towards Kacheguda railway station

Overview
- Service type: Vande Bharat Express
- Locale: Telangana, Andhra Pradesh and Karnataka
- First service: 24 September 2023 (Inaugural run); 25 September 2023; 2 years ago (Commercial run)
- Current operator: South Central Railways (SCR)

Route
- Termini: Kacheguda (KCG); Yesvantpur Junction (YPR)
- Stops: 5
- Distance travelled: 612 km (380 mi)
- Average journey time: 08 hrs 15 mins
- Service frequency: Six days a week (Note: Except Wednesdays)
- Train number: 20703 / 20704
- Lines used: Secunderabad–Dhone section Guntakal–Nandyal section Guntakal–Bangalore section

On-board services
- Classes: AC Chair Car, AC Executive Chair Car
- Seating arrangements: Airline style; Rotatable seats
- Sleeping arrangements: No
- Catering facilities: On-board catering
- Observation facilities: Large windows in all coaches
- Entertainment facilities: On-board WiFi; Infotainment System; Electric outlets; Reading light; Seat Pockets; Bottle Holder; Tray Table
- Baggage facilities: Overhead racks
- Other facilities: Kavach

Technical
- Rolling stock: Mini Vande Bharat 2.0 (Last service: July 08 2025); Vande Bharat 2.0 (First service: July 10, 2025)
- Track gauge: Indian gauge 1,676 mm (5 ft 6 in) broad gauge
- Electrification: 25 kV 50 Hz AC Overhead line
- Operating speed: 74 km/h (46 mph) (Avg.)
- Average length: 384 metres (1,260 ft) (16 coaches)
- Track owner: Indian Railways
- Rake maintenance: Kacheguda (KCG)

The 20703/20704 Kacheguda - Yesvantpur Vande Bharat Express is India's 29th Vande Bharat Express train, connecting the city of Hyderabad in Telangana with city of Bangalore in Karnataka. This train was inaugurated on 24 September 2023 by Prime Minister Narendra Modi via video conference from New Delhi.

== Overview ==
This is the third Vande Bharat Express train for Telangana. This train is operated by Indian Railways, connecting Kacheguda, Mahbubnagar, Kurnool City, Anantapur, Dharmavaram Jn, Hindupur and Yesvantpur Jn. It is currently operated with train numbers 20703/20704 on 6 days a week basis.

== Rakes ==
It is the twenty-seventh 2nd Generation and fifteenth Mini Vande Bharat 2.0 Express train which was designed and manufactured by the Integral Coach Factory at Perambur, Chennai under the Make in India Initiative.

=== Coach Augmentation ===
As per latest updates, this express train will be augmented with 8 additional AC coaches, thereby running with an existing Vande Bharat 2.0 trainset W.E.F. 10 July 2025 in order to enhance passenger capacity on this demanding route.

== Service ==
The 20703/20704 Kacheguda - Yesvantpur Jn Vande Bharat Express operates six days a week except Wednesdays, covering a distance of 612 km (380 mi) in a travel time of 8 hours with an average speed of 74 km/h (46 mph). The service has 5 intermediate stops. The Maximum Permissible Speed is 130 km/h (81 mph).

== See also ==
- Vande Bharat Express
- Tejas Express
- Gatimaan Express
- Kacheguda railway station
- Yesvantpur Junction railway station
