= Kacheguda–Ashokapuram Express =

Train in India

Kacheguda–Ashokapuram Superfast Express

Overview
- Service type: Superfast Express
- First service: 19 May 1975; 49 years ago
- Current operator(s): South Central Railway

Route
- Termini: Kacheguda (KCG); Ashokapuram (AP)
- Stops: 19
- Distance travelled: 770 km (478 mi)
- Average journey time: 15 hrs 35 mins
- Service frequency: Daily (Note: Runs seven days in a week for every direction.)
- Train number(s): 12785 / 12786

On-board services
- Class(es): AC First Class, AC 2 Tier, AC 3 Tier, Sleeper Class, General Unreserved
- Seating arrangements: No
- Sleeping arrangements: Yes
- Catering facilities: On-board catering, E-catering
- Observation facilities: Rake sharing with 17063/17064 Ajanta Express
- Baggage facilities: No
- Other facilities: Below the seats

Technical
- Rolling stock: LHB coach
- Track gauge: 1,676 mm (5 ft 6 in)
- Operating speed: 51 km/h (32 mph) average including halts.

The 12785 / 12786 Kacheguda–Ashokapuram Superfast Express is a Daily Superfast Express train belonging to South Central Railway zone that runs between Kacheguda and Ashokapuram in India. It is currently being operated with 12785/12786 train numbers on a daily basis. It is the only direct connects Ashokapuram Mysuru in Karnataka to Kacheguda Hyderabad in Telangana. On daily basis.

== Service ==
- 12785/Kacheguda–Ashokapuram Superfast Express has an average speed of 50 km/h and covers 764 km in 15h 35m.
- 12786/Ashokapuram–Kacheguda Superfast Express has an average speed of 53 km/h and covers 764 km in 14h 45m.

The Service extended from K.S.R Bangalore City to Mysore since 04-03-2019.
The Service again extended from Mysore to Ashokapuram Since 07-04-2025.

== Rake sharing ==
The train shares its rake with 17063/17064 Ajanta Express

== Route and halts ==
The important halts of the train are:

- Kacheguda
- Jadcherla
- Mahbubnagar
- Gadwal Junction
- Kurnool City
- Dhone Junction
- Gooty Junction
- Anantapur
- Dharmavaram Junction
- Penukonda Junction
- Hindupur
- Gauribidanur
- Doddaballapur
- Yelahanka Junction
- Bangalore East
- Bangalore Cantonment
- Bangalore City
- Kengeri
- Ramanagaram
- Mandya
- Mysuru Junction
- Ashokapuram

== Coach composition ==
The train has standard LHB coach with max speed of 130 kmph. The train consists of 22 coaches:(W.E.F-03/01/2025)

- 1 First AC
- 2 AC II Tier
- 5 AC III Tier
- 8 Sleeper coaches
- 4 General Unreserved
- 1 Seating cum Luggage Rake
- 1 Power car/Generator car

As is customary with most other train services in India, coach composition may be amended at the discretion of Indian Railways, depending on demand.

Loco	1	2	3	4	5	6	7	8	9	10	11	12	13	14	15	16	17	18	19	20	21	22
	SLR	GEN	GEN	S1	S2	S3	S4	S5	S6	S7	S8	B1	B2	B3	B4	B5	A1	A2	HA1	GEN	GEN	EoG

== Traction ==
Both trains are hauled by a WAP7 locomotive from Kacheguda to Ashokapuram, and vice versa.

== See also ==
- Kacheguda railway station
- Bangalore City railway station
- Mysore Junction railway station
- Ajanta Express
