= Gwalior - SMVT Bengaluru Express =

Train in India

Gwalior - SMVT Bengaluru Weekly Express
Overview
- Service type: Express
- First service: 26 June 2025; 9 months ago
- Current operator: North Central Railway

Route
- Termini: Gwalior (GWL); Sir M. Visvesvaraya Terminal, Bengaluru (SMVB)
- Stops: 23
- Distance travelled: 2,073 km (1,288 mi)
- Service frequency: Weekly (Note: Runs once in a week for every direction.)
- Train number: 11086 / 11085

On-board services
- Classes: General, Sleeper, Third AC, Third AC Economy, Second AC
- Seating arrangements: Yes
- Sleeping arrangements: Yes
- Catering facilities: Available
- Observation facilities: Large windows
- Baggage facilities: Available
- Other facilities: Below the seats

Technical
- Rolling stock: LHB coach
- Track gauge: 1,676 mm (5 ft 6 in)
- Operating speed: 130 km/h (81 mph) maximum.

The 11086 / 11085 Gwalior - SMVT Bengaluru Express is an express train of the Indian Railways connecting Gwalior in Madhya Pradesh and Bengaluru in Karnataka. It was inaugurated on 26 June 2025.

== Coach composition ==
This train runs with 22 Linke-Hoffman Busch coaches, consisting of General (GS), Sleeper (SL), Third AC (3A), Third AC Economy (3E) and Second AC (2A) classes. It has a dedicated rake with primary maintenance at Gwalior and secondary maintenance at Sir M. Visvesvaraya Terminal, Bengaluru.

Legends
EOG/SLR	PC	MIL	H	A	HA	B	AB	G	K	E	C	S	D	GEN/UR
Generator cum luggage van	Pantry car or Hot buffet car	Military coach	First AC (1A)	Second AC (2A)	First AC cum Second AC	Third AC (3A)	Third AC cum Second AC	Third AC economy (3E)	Anubhuti coach (K)	Executive chair car (EC)	AC Chair car (CC)	Sleeper class (SL)	Second seating (2S)	General or Unreserved
	Loco and other service coach													
	AC coach													
	Non-AC coach													

(Note: Note that the "M" notation is used for Third AC Econony coaches. The "G" notation mentioned here is used only in Garib Rath trains.)

Coach Position of 11086 (ex. Gwalior)

Loco	1	2	3	4	5	6	7	8	9	10	11	12	13	14	15	16	17	18	19	20	21	22
	EOG	GEN	GEN	A1	A2	B1	B2	B3	B4	M1	M2	M3	S1	S2	S3	S4	S5	S6	S7	GEN	GEN	EOG

Coach Position of 11085 (ex. SMVT Bengaluru)

Loco	1	2	3	4	5	6	7	8	9	10	11	12	13	14	15	16	17	18	19	20	21	22
	EOG	GEN	GEN	A1	A2	B1	B2	B3	B4	M1	M2	M3	S1	S2	S3	S4	S5	S6	S7	GEN	GEN	EOG

Note that the train reverses its direction at Guna Junction. So, the position of coaches for all stations after Guna is the exact opposite of what is mentioned here. Passengers are advised to check the coach position indicators at the station before boarding.

== Timings ==
- The 11086 Gwalior - SMVT Bengaluru Express leaves Gwalior every Friday at 15:00 hrs and reaches Sir M. Visvesvaraya Terminal on Sunday at 07:35 hrs. It takes 40 hours and 35 minutes to complete its journey, averaging at 51 km/h (32 mph).
- The 11085 SMVT Bengaluru - Gwalior Express leaves Sir M. Visvesvaraya Terminal every Sunday at 15:50 hrs and reaches Gwalior on Tuesday at 10:25 hrs. It takes 42 hours and 35 minutes to complete its journey, averaging at 49 km/h (30 mph).

== Route and halts ==
The train covers a distance of 2,073 km (1,288 mi), passing through important cities and towns such as Bhopal, Nagpur, Hyderabad, Kurnool and Anantapur. It halts at the following stations:

- Gwalior Junction (start)
- Shivpuri
- Guna Junction (Note: The train reverses its direction at this station.)
- Ashoknagar
- Bina Junction
- Vidisha
- Bhopal Junction
- Betul
- Nagpur Junction
- Sewagram Junction
- Chandrapur
- Balharshah
- Sirpur Kaghaznagar
- Bellampalli
- Kazipet Junction
- Kacheguda
- Mahbubnagar
- Gadwal
- Kurnool City
- Dhone Junction
- Anantapur
- Dharmavaram Junction
- Hindupur
- Yelahanka Junction
- Sir M. Visvesvaraya Terminal, Bengaluru (end)

== Traction ==
Since the route is completely electrified, the train is hauled by a WAP-7 locomotive of Kanpur shed from end to end.
