= Prashanti Nilayam Express =

Train in India

Overview
- Service type: Express train
- First service: 5 September 2001; 24 years ago
- Current operator: South Central Railway

Route
- Termini: Kacheguda (KCG); Yelahanka (YNK)
- Stops: 14
- Distance travelled: 652 km (405 mi)
- Average journey time: 12 hours 30 minutes (average)
- Service frequency: Daily
- Train number: 17603 / 17604

On-board services
- Classes: AC 2 Tier, AC 3 Tier, AC 3 Tier Economy, Sleeper Class, General Unreserved
- Seating arrangements: Yes
- Sleeping arrangements: Yes
- Catering facilities: On-board catering, E-catering
- Observation facilities: Large windows
- Baggage facilities: No
- Other facilities: Below the seats

Technical
- Rolling stock: LHB coach
- Track gauge: 1,676 mm (5 ft 6 in)
- Operating speed: 52 km/h (32 mph) average including halts.

The 17603 / 17604 Prashanti Nilayam Express is an express train belonging to Indian Railways that runs between Kacheguda station in Hyderabad, Telangana, and Yelahanka Junction in Bengaluru, Karnataka, in India. It is named after the Prasanthi Nilayam ashram in Puttaparthi, Andhra Pradesh, because it serves the nearby Sathya Sai Prasanthi Nilayam railway station.

It operates as train number 17603 from Kacheguda to Yelahanka Junction and as train number 17604 in the reverse direction, serving the states of Telangana, Andhra Pradesh, Karnataka.

Previously, it ran to Yesvantpur Junction but, during COVID-19, it terminated at Yelahanka Junction and continuing the same destination.

== Coaches ==
The train has one first class air-conditioned coach, two air-conditioned 2 tier, two air-conditioned 3 tier, two air-conditioned 3 tier economy, ten sleeper class and two general unreserved coaches. It frequently carries a couple of high capacity parcel van coaches.

As with most train services in India, coach composition may be amended at the discretion of Indian Railways depending on demand.

Loco	1	2	3	4	5	6	7	8	9	10	11	12	13	14	15	16	17	18	19	20	21	22	23	24	25
	EOG	GEN	S1	S2	S3	S4	S5	S6	S7	S8	S9	S10	B1	B2	B3	B4	M1	M2	A1	A2	A3	H1	GEN	GEN	SLR

== Service ==
The 17603 express covers the distance of 652 kilometres (405 mi) in 12 hours 30 mins (5 kilometres per hour (3.1 mph)) and 12 hours 40 mins as the 17604 Yelahanka Junction–Kacheguda Prashanti Nilayam Express (53 kilometres per hour (33 mph)).

As its average speed in both directions is below 55 kilometres per hour (34 mph), by Indian Railways rules it does not have an express surcharge.

== Routeing ==
The train runs from Kacheguda via Jadcherla, Mahbubnagar, Kurnool City, Dhone Junction, Guntakal Junction, Gooty Junction, Dharmavaram Junction, Sathya Sai Prasanthi Nilayam, Hindupur to Yelahanka Junction.

== Traction ==
earlier this train with diesel locomotive WDP-4. now The train is hauled by a Lallaguda Loco Shed-based WAP-7 and WAP-4 electric locomotive on its entire journey.
