= Yesvantpur–Kacheguda Express =

Express train in India

Overview
- Service type: Mail/Express
- First service: 01 March 2014
- Current operator: South Western Railways

Route
- Termini: Yesvantpur Junction (YPR); Kacheguda (KCG)
- Stops: 13
- Distance travelled: 612 km (380 mi)
- Average journey time: 13 hours 15 mins
- Service frequency: Tri-Weekly
- Train number: 16569 / 16570

On-board services
- Classes: AC 1st Class, AC 2 tier, AC 3 tier, Sleeper, General
- Seating arrangements: Yes
- Sleeping arrangements: Yes
- Catering facilities: No pantry car attached E-catering available

Technical
- Rolling stock: LHB coach
- Track gauge: 1,676 mm (5 ft 6 in)
- Operating speed: 110 km/h (68 mph) maximum, 52 km/h (32 mph) average including halts

The 16569 / 16570 Yesvantpur–Kacheguda Express is an Express train belonging to South Western Railway zone of Indian Railways that run between Yesvantpur Junction and Kacheguda in India.

== Background ==
This train was inaugurated on 1 March 2014, Flagged off by Mallikarjun Kharge Former Minister of Railways for more connectivity between Bangalore and Hyderabad.

== Service ==
The frequency of this train is three days a week, it covers the distance of 612 km with an average speed of 46 km/h.

== Routes ==
This train passes through Yelahanka Junction, Dharmavaram Junction, Gooty Junction, Dhone Junction and Kurnool City for by passing both sides.

== Traction ==
As this route is going to be electrified, a KJM-based WDP-4D locomotive and WAG-7 pulls the train to its destination on both directions.
