= Venkatadri Express =

Train in India

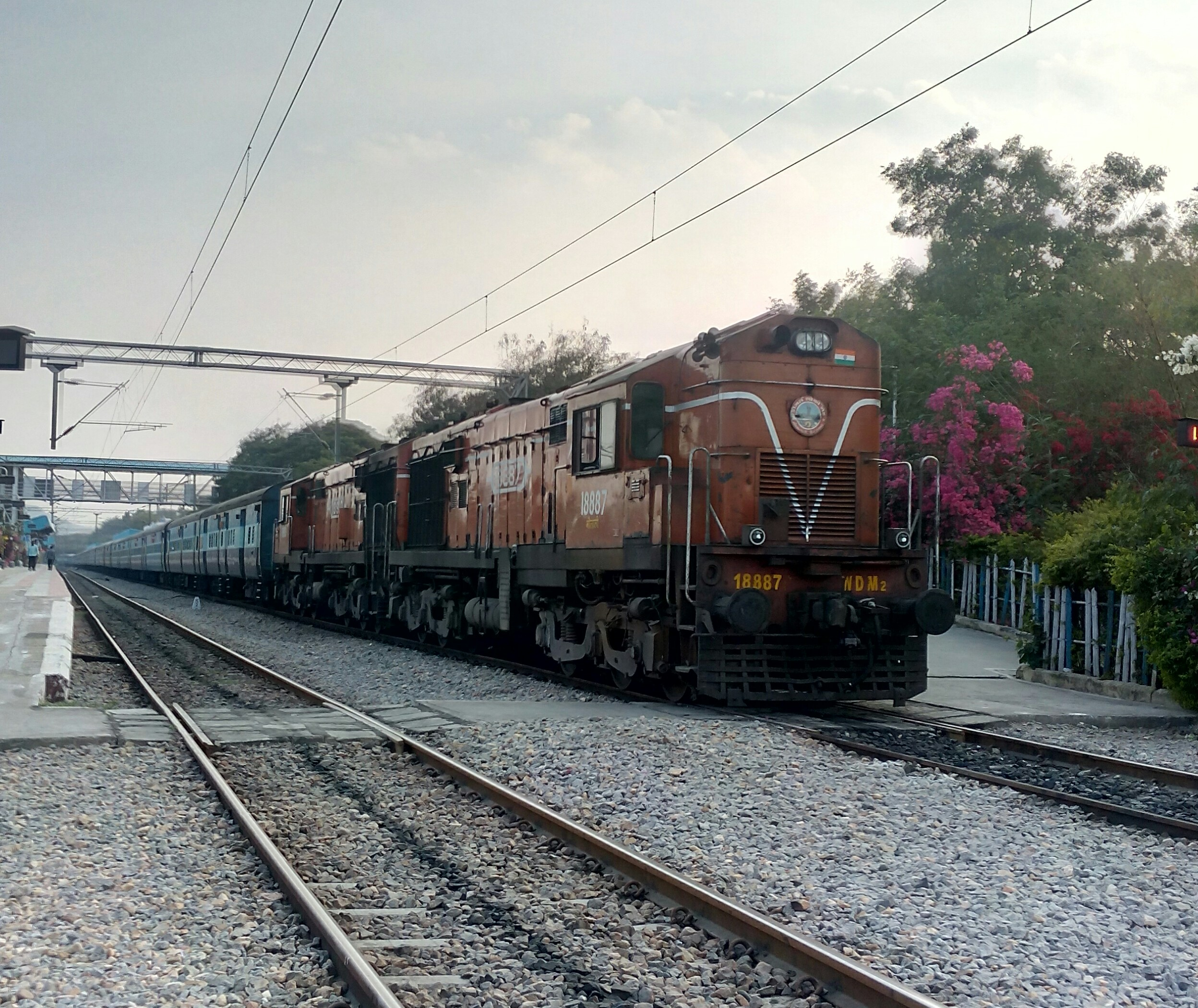
- Venkatadri Express hauled by a Moula Ali based WDM-2 twins locomotive.

Overview
- Service type: Express
- Locale: Telangana & Andhra Pradesh
- First service: 19 May 1975; 51 years ago
- Current operator: South Central Railway

Route
- Termini: Kacheguda (KCG); Chittoor (CTO)
- Stops: 19
- Distance travelled: 709 km (441 mi)
- Average journey time: 12 hours 50 minutes
- Service frequency: Daily
- Train number: 12797 / 12798

On-board services
- Classes: AC first, AC 2 tier, AC 3 tier, Sleeper Class, General Unreserved
- Seating arrangements: Yes
- Sleeping arrangements: Yes
- Catering facilities: On-board catering, E-catering
- Baggage facilities: Available
- Other facilities: Below the seats

Technical
- Rolling stock: LHB coach
- Track gauge: 1,676 mm (5 ft 6 in)
- Operating speed: 55 km/h (34 mph) average including halts
Route map
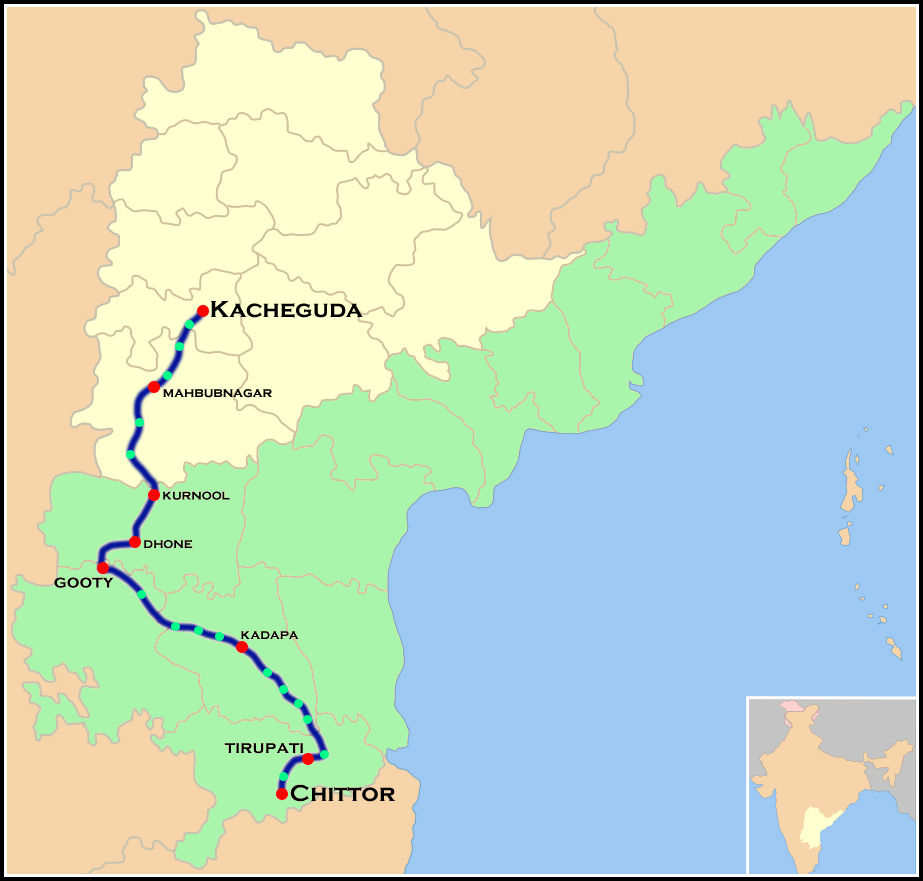

The 12797 / 12798 Venkatadri Express is a Superfast train belonging to Indian Railways, connecting Kacheguda in Hyderabad (Telangana) to Chittoor in Andhra Pradesh.

== Route & halts ==
- Kacheguda
- Umdanagar
- Mahbubnagar
- Kurnool City
- Dhone
- Gooty
- Yerraguntla Junction
- Kadapa
- Rajampet
- Renigunta
- Tirupati
- Pakala
- Chittoor

== Coach composition ==
This train converted into LHB coach from ICF coach on 4th July 2024 from Kacheguda to Chittoor and from Chittoor to Kacheguda on 5th July 2024 The train has standard LHB rakes with a maximum speed of 130 km/h. The train consists of 22 coaches and have no rake share and have 2 dedicated lhb rakes :

- 1 AC First Class
- 3 AC II Tier
- 5 AC III Tier
- 1 AC III Tier Economy
- 6 Sleeper coaches
- 4 General Unreserved
- 1 End On Generator Rake
- 1 Second Class Luggage Rake

== Traction ==
Both trains are hauled by a Vijayawada Loco Shed-based WAP-4 or Lallaguda Loco Shed-based WAP-7 electric locomotive from Kacheguda to Chittoor and vice versa.
