= Kacheguda–Madurai Weekly Express =

Train in India

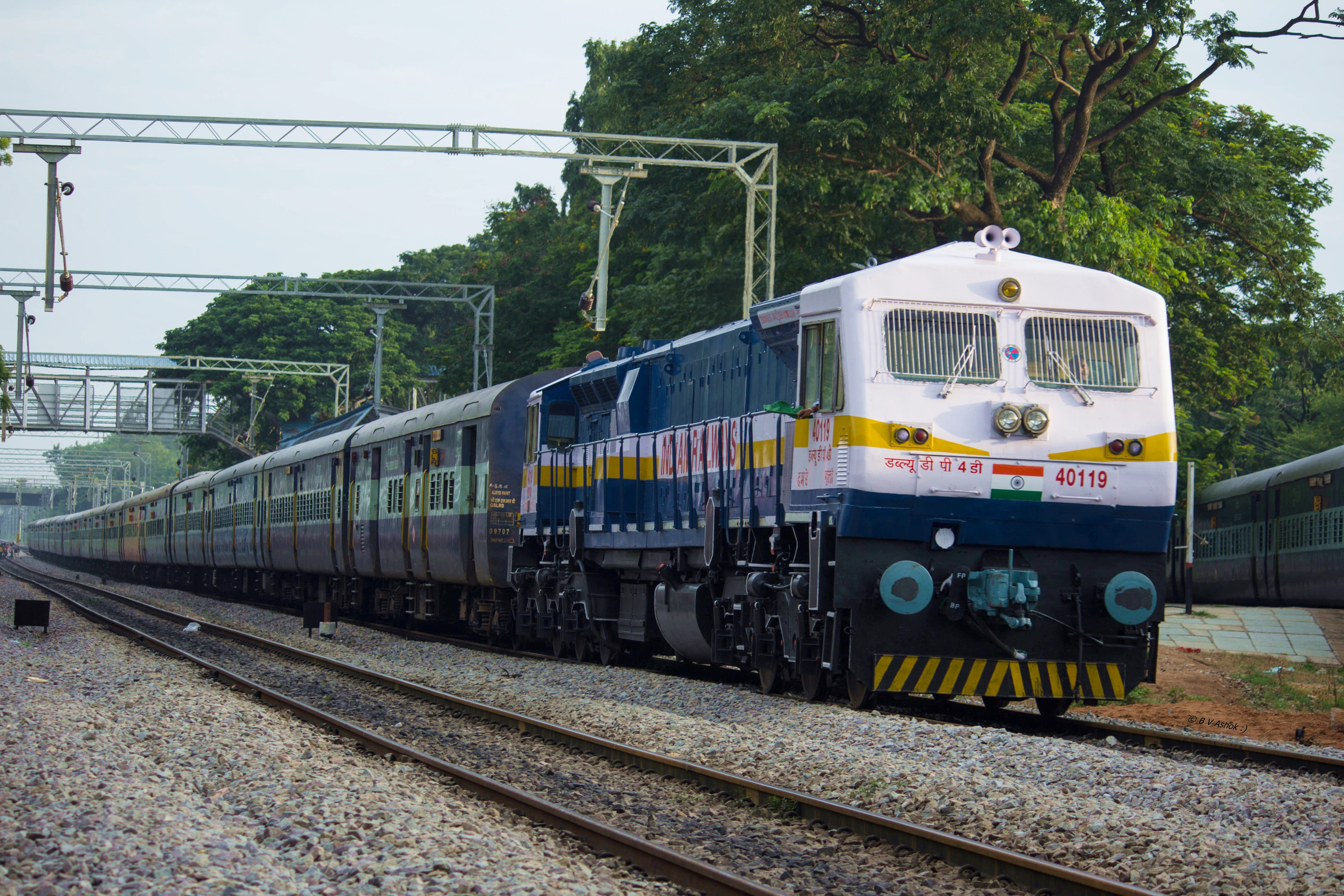

Overview
- Service type: Express
- First service: 28 May 2013; 13 years ago
- Current operator: South Central Railway zone

Route
- Termini: Kacheguda (KCG); Madurai Junction (MDU)
- Stops: 21
- Distance travelled: 1,289 km (801 mi)
- Average journey time: 23h 05m
- Service frequency: Weekly (Note: Runs one day in a week for every direction.)
- Train number: 22715/22716

On-board services
- Classes: AC First Class, AC 2 tier, AC 3 tier, Sleeper class, General Unreserved
- Seating arrangements: No
- Sleeping arrangements: Yes
- Catering facilities: On-board catering E-catering
- Observation facilities: LHB coach
- Entertainment facilities: No
- Baggage facilities: No
- Other facilities: Below the seats

Technical
- Rolling stock: LHB coach
- Track gauge: 1,676 mm (5 ft 6 in)
- Operating speed: 56 km/h (35 mph), including halts
Route map
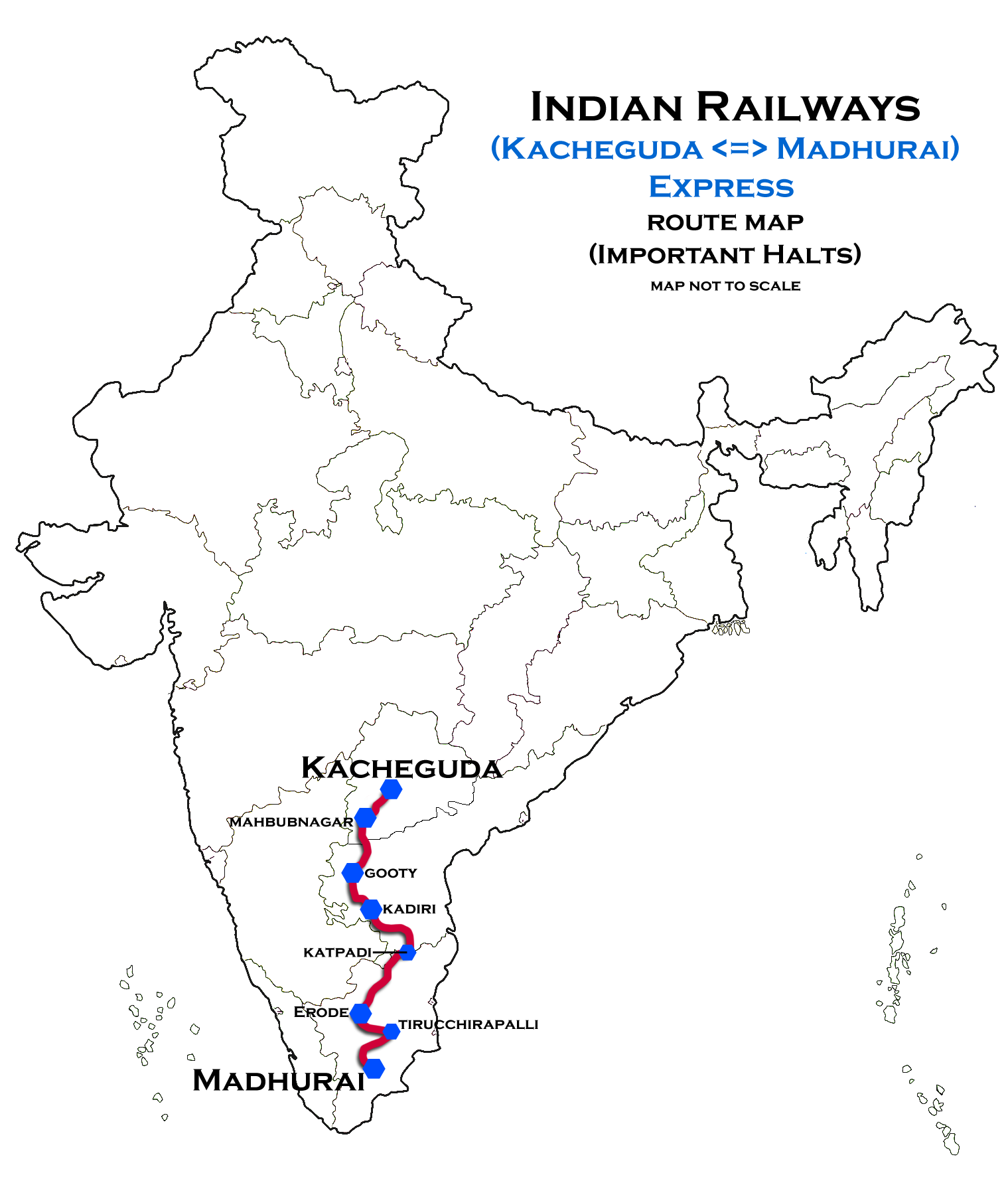

The Kacheguda–Madurai Weekly Express is a Superfast Express train belonging to South Central Railway zone that runs between Kacheguda and Madurai Junction in India. It is currently being operated with 22715/22716 train numbers on a weekly basis.

== Service ==
The 22715/Kacheguda–Madurai Weekly Express has an average speed of 56 km/h and covers 1289 km in 22h 55m. The 22716/Madurai–Kacheguda Weekly Express has an average speed of 55 km/h and covers 1289 km in 23h 25m.

== Route and halts ==
The important halts of the train are:

- Kacheguda
- Mahbubnagar
- Gadwal
- Kurnool City
- Dhone Junction
- Anantapur
- Dharmavaram Junction
- Kadiri
- Madanapalle Road
- Pileru
- Pakala Junction
- Chittoor
- Katpadi Junction
- Ambur railway station
- Vaniyambadi railway station
- Jolarpettai Junction
- Salem Junction
- Erode Junction railway station
- Tiruchirappalli Junction
- Dindigul Junction
- Kodaikanal Road
- Madurai Junction

== Coach composition ==
The train has standard LHB rakes with a maximum speed of 130 km/h. The train consists of 22 coaches:

- 1 AC I Tier
- 3 AC II Tier
- 5 AC III Tier
- 1 Pantry Car
- 6 Sleeper coaches
- 4 General Unreserved
- 1 Seating cum Luggage
- 1 Engine Generator car Rake

== Traction ==
Both trains are hauled by a WAP-7 Electric locomotive from Kacheguda to Madurai and vice versa.

== Rake sharing ==
The train shares its rake with 12789/12790 Murdeshwar–Kacheguda Express and 17615/17616 Kacheguda-Tuticorin Express

== Direction reversal ==
The train reverses its direction twice:

- Pakala Junction
- Erode Junction

== See also ==
- Kacheguda railway station
- Madurai Junction railway station
- Mangalore Central–Kacheguda Express
