= Chennai–Nagarsol Express =

Passenger train in India

Chennai Central–Nagarsol Express
Overview
- Service type: Express
- Locale: Tamil Nadu, Andhra Pradesh, Telangana & Maharashtra
- First service: 2 March 2014; 12 years ago
- Current operator: Indian Railways

Route
- Termini: Chennai Central (MAS); Nagarsol (NSL)
- Stops: 24
- Distance travelled: 1,367 km (849 mi)
- Average journey time: 26 hours 45 mins
- Service frequency: Weekly
- Train number: 16003 / 16004

On-board services
- Classes: AC 2 Tier, AC 3 Tier, Sleeper Class & General Unreserved
- Seating arrangements: Yes
- Sleeping arrangements: Yes
- Catering facilities: No

Technical
- Rolling stock: ICF coach
- Track gauge: 1,676 mm (5 ft 6 in)
- Electrification: 25 kV 50 Hz AC
- Operating speed: 55 km/h (34 mph) average including halts
- Rake sharing: 22601 / 22602 Chennai–Sainagar Shirdi Express
Route map
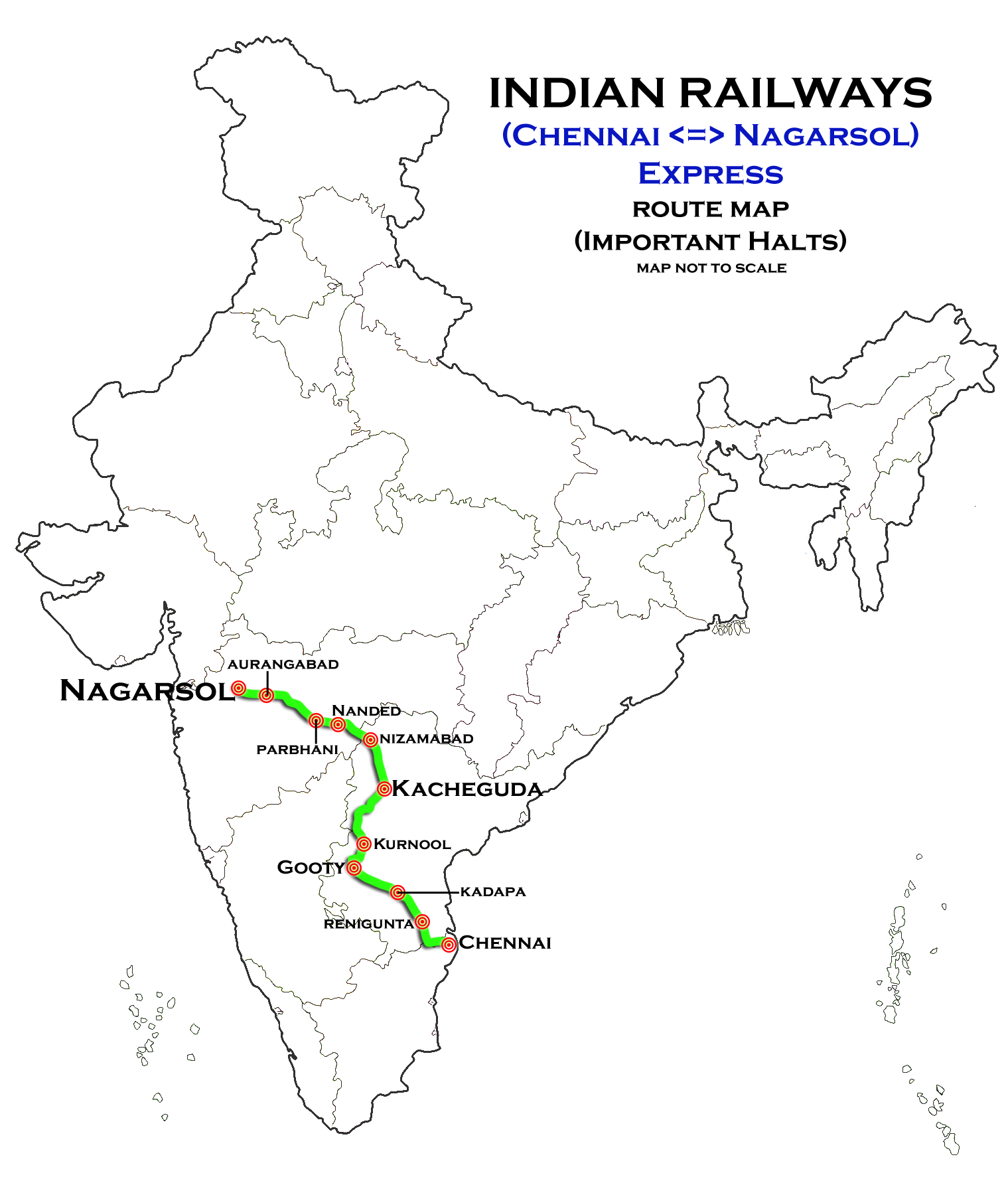

The 16003 / 16004 Chennai Central–Nagarsol Express is an express train belonging to Indian Railways Southern Railway zone that run between Chennai Central and Nagarsol in India. This is the only train that connects Chennai with Kamareddy, Nizamabad, Basar, Mudkhed, Hazur Sahib Nanded, Purna, Parbhani, Jalna, Aurangabad and Nagarsol. There are no other trains that connects these places with Chennai. This train is operated by the Southern Railway zone of the Indian Railways

== Service ==
It operates as train number 16003 from Chennai Central to Nagarsol and as train number 16004 in the reverse direction serving the states of Tamil Nadu, Andhra Pradesh, Telangana & Maharashtra . The train covers the distance of 1,366 km (849 mi) in 27 hours 7 mins approximately at a speed of (55 km/h (34 mph)).

== Coaches ==
The 16003 / 04 Chennai Central–Nagarsol Express has Three AC 2-Tier, Three AC 3 Tier, 13 Sleeper Class, 3 General Unreserved & Two SLR (seating with luggage rake) coaches. It doesn't carry a pantry car.

As with most train services in India, coach composition may be amended at the discretion of Indian Railways depending on demand.

== Routeing ==
The 16003 / 04 Chennai Central–Nagarsol Express runs from Chennai Central via Arakkonam Junction, Renigunta Junction, Gooty Junction, Dhone Junction, Kacheguda, Nizamabad, Hazur Sahib Nanded, Parbhani Junction, Jalna, Chhatrapati Sambhajinagar to Nagarsol.

== Traction ==
As this route is fully electrified, a Arakkonam-based Electric Locomotive WAP-4 pulls the train to its destination and vice versa.
