= Andhra Pradesh Sampark Kranti Express =

Train in India

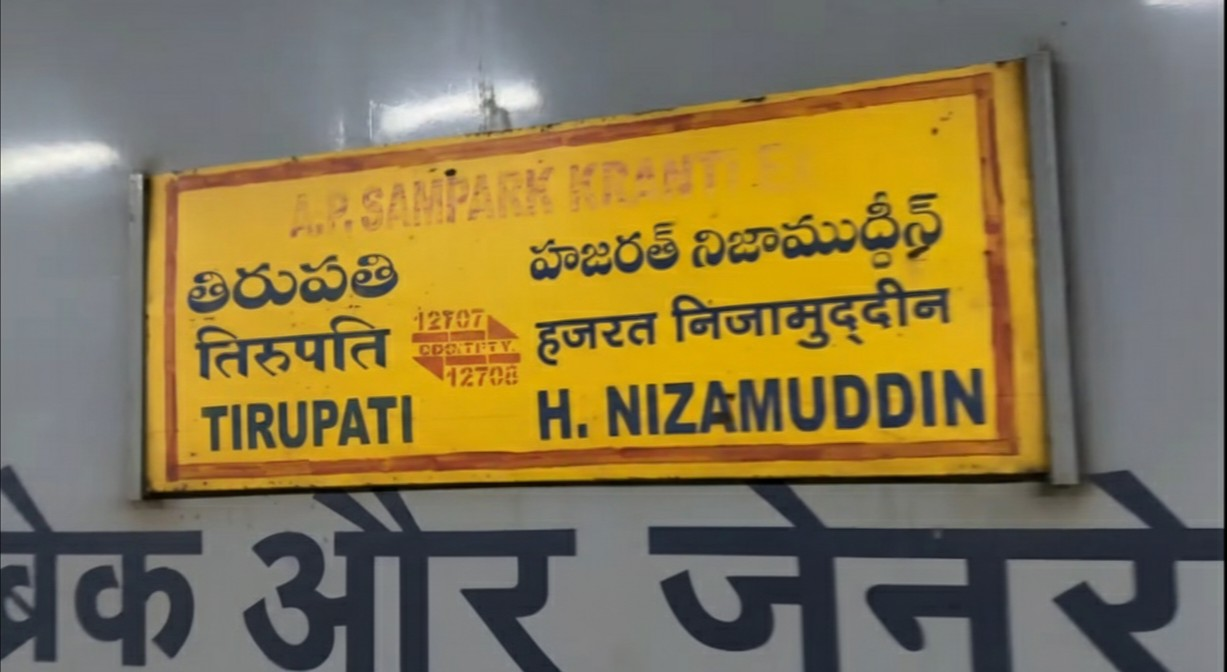

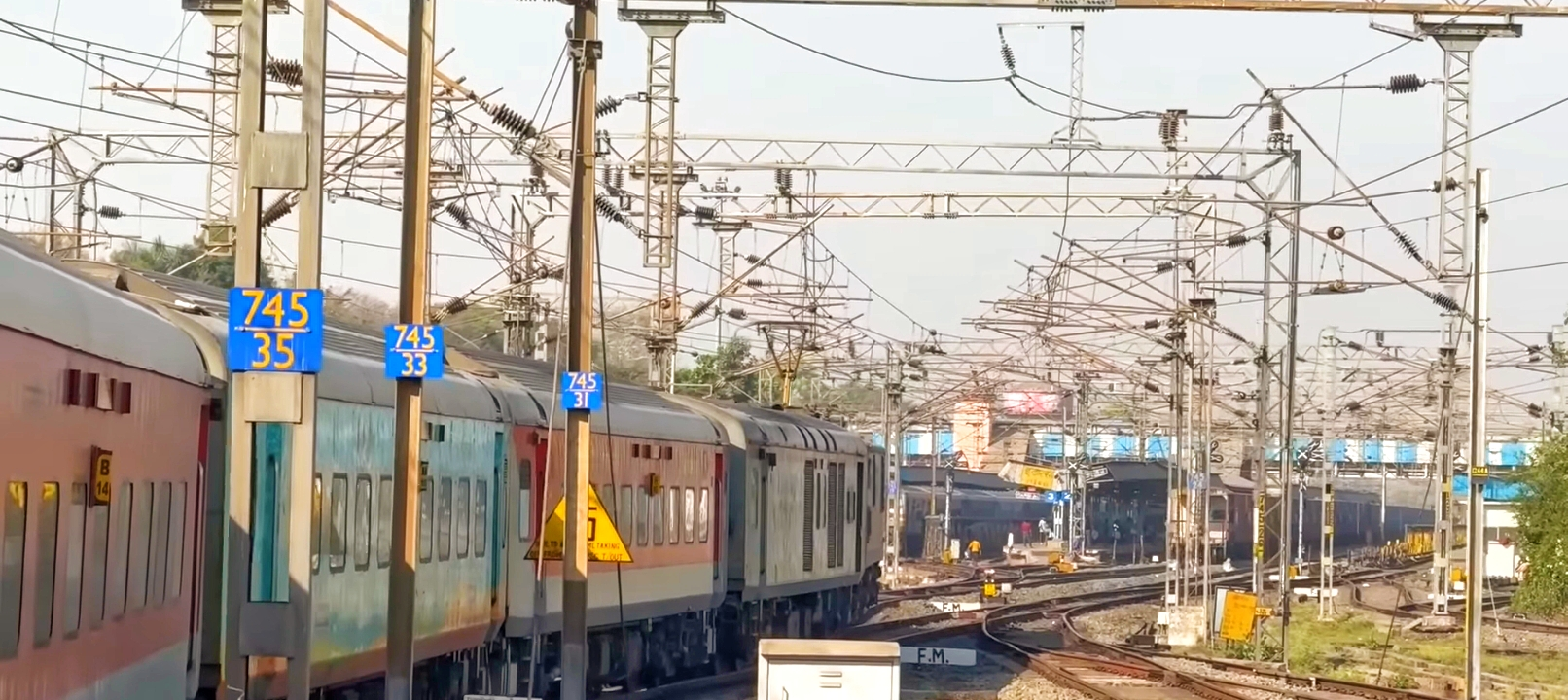
- Andhra Pradesh Sampark Kranti Express Arriving At Itarsi Junction railway station

Overview
- Service type: Sampark Kranti Express
- Locale: Andhra Pradesh, Telangana, Maharashtra, Madhya Pradesh, Rajasthan, Uttar Pradesh & Delhi
- First service: 21 March 2005; 21 years ago
- Current operator: South Coast Railway

Route
- Termini: Tirupati (TPTY); Hazrat Nizamuddin (NZM)
- Stops: 18
- Distance travelled: 2,304 km (1,432 mi)
- Average journey time: 36 hours 15 minutes
- Service frequency: Tri-weekly
- Train number: 12707 / 12708

On-board services
- Classes: AC 2 Tier, AC 3 Tier, Sleeper, Pantry
- Seating arrangements: Yes
- Sleeping arrangements: Yes
- Catering facilities: Available
- Other facilities: Below the seats

Technical
- Rolling stock: LHB coach
- Track gauge: 1,676 mm (5 ft 6 in)
- Operating speed: 63.55 km/h (39 mph) average speed with halts
Route map
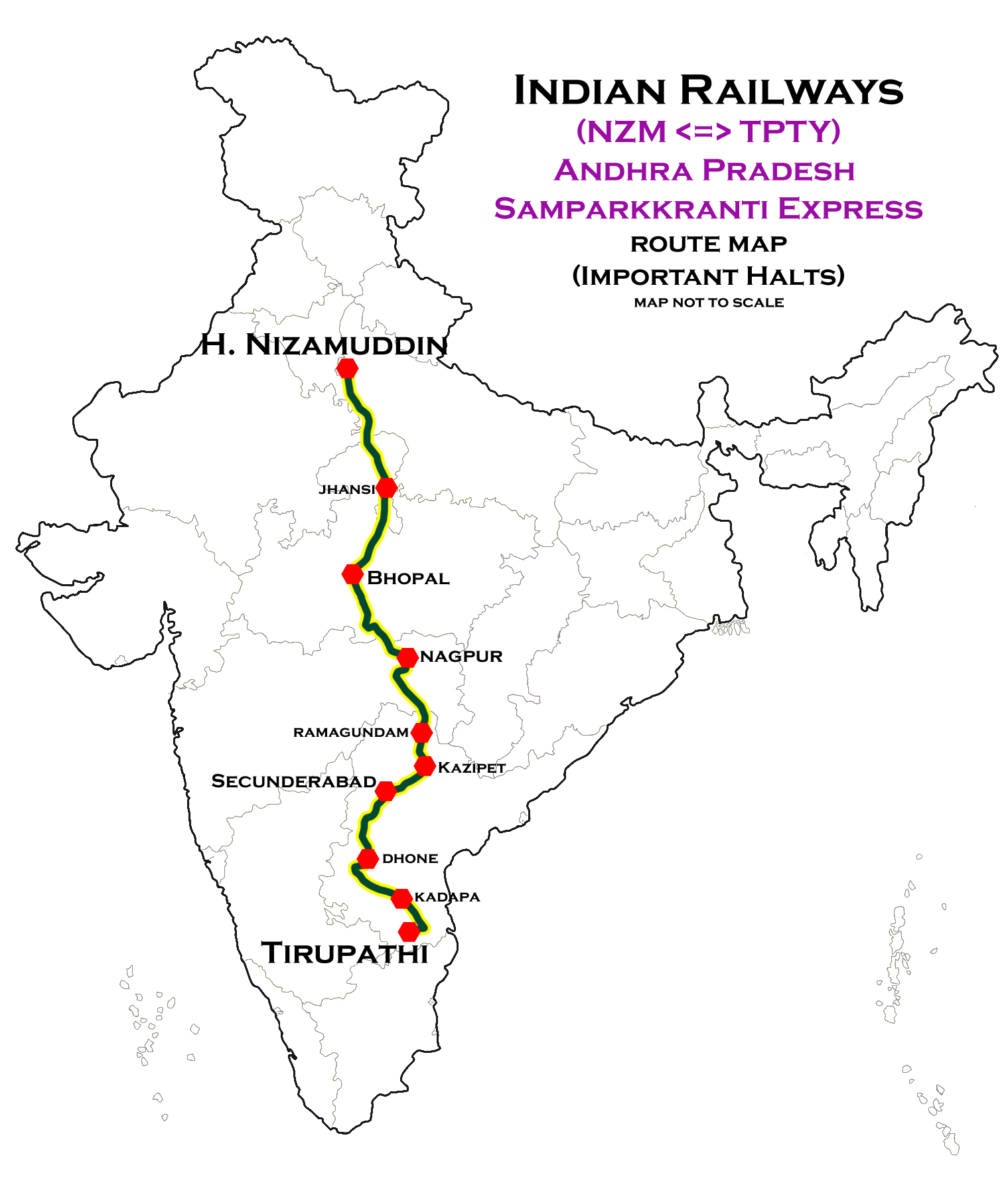

The 12707 / 12708 Andhra Pradesh Sampark Kranti Express is a South Central Railway train running from New Delhi to Tirupati. It is part of the Sampark Kranti Express series of trains, which link the Indian national capital, New Delhi, with the rest of the state capitals, with only a limited number of stops on each service.

== Service ==
The Andhra Pradesh Sampark Kranti Express commenced operations between Secunderabad and Hazrat Nizamuddin near New Delhi. On 6 July 2005, Shri Anjan Kumar Yadav, MP, and Hyderabad mayor, Teegala Krishna Reddy, flagged off the train from Secunderabad station when the service was extended to Tirupati via Kurnool, Dhone and Kadapa.

The Andhra Pradesh Sampark Kranti Express operates as a three times a week train service between Secunderabad, Hazrat Nizamuddin and Tirupati.

Before the Andhra Pradesh Sampark Kranti Express was introduced, the (12625/12626) Kerala Express between New Delhi and Trivandrum was the only daily train connecting the Tirupati and New Delhi.

== Coach composition ==
Present coach composition comprises 2-SLR coaches, 2-II/General coaches, 4- AC 3 Tier Coaches, 1-AC 2 Tier Coach, 1-Pantry, 1- 1st AC Coach and 9-Sleeper coaches. During the summer extra coaches are provided based on need. An additional 3 tier AC coach was added in September 2012.

== Route & halts ==
The schedule is given below:-

Andhra Pradesh Sampark Kranti Express
12707		Stations	12708	
Arrival	Departure	Stations	Arrival	Departure
----	05:30	Tirupati	20:50	----
05:45	05:50	Renigunta	19:58	20:00
07:28	07:30	Kadapa	18:03	18:05
07:59	08:00	Yerraguntla Junction	17:24	17:25
08:59	09:00	Tadipatri	16:24	16:25
11:00	11:05	Dhone Junction	14:55	15:00
12:03	12:05	Kurnool City	13:28	13:30
16:30	16:40	Kacheguda	08:50	09:00
18:58	19:00	Kazipet	05:08	05:10
20:29	20:30	Ramagundam	03:39	03:40
20:44	20:45	Mancherial	NIL	NIL
21:04	21:05	Bellampalli	NIL	NIL
21:34	21:35	Sirpur Kaghaznagar	02:44	02:45
22:55	23:00	Balharshah	01:50	01:55
01:55	02:00	Nagpur	22:20	22:25
08:15	08:25	Bhopal Junction	16:00	16:05
12:05	12:13	Jhansi Junction	11:30	11:40
13:20	13:22	Gwalior Junction	09:56	09:58
18:35	----	Hazrat Nizamuddin	----	05:20

== Locomotive ==
A Lallaguda locomotive shed WAP-7 hauls the train from Tirupati to Hazrat Nizamuddin Railway Station in delhi and vice versa

== See also ==
- Andhra Pradesh Express
- Hussainsagar Express
- Goa Sampark Kranti Express
- Madhya Pradesh Sampark Kranti Express
