= Dhone Junction railway station =

Railway Station in Andhra Pradesh

Coordinates: 15.3952°N 77.8680°E

Dhone Junction
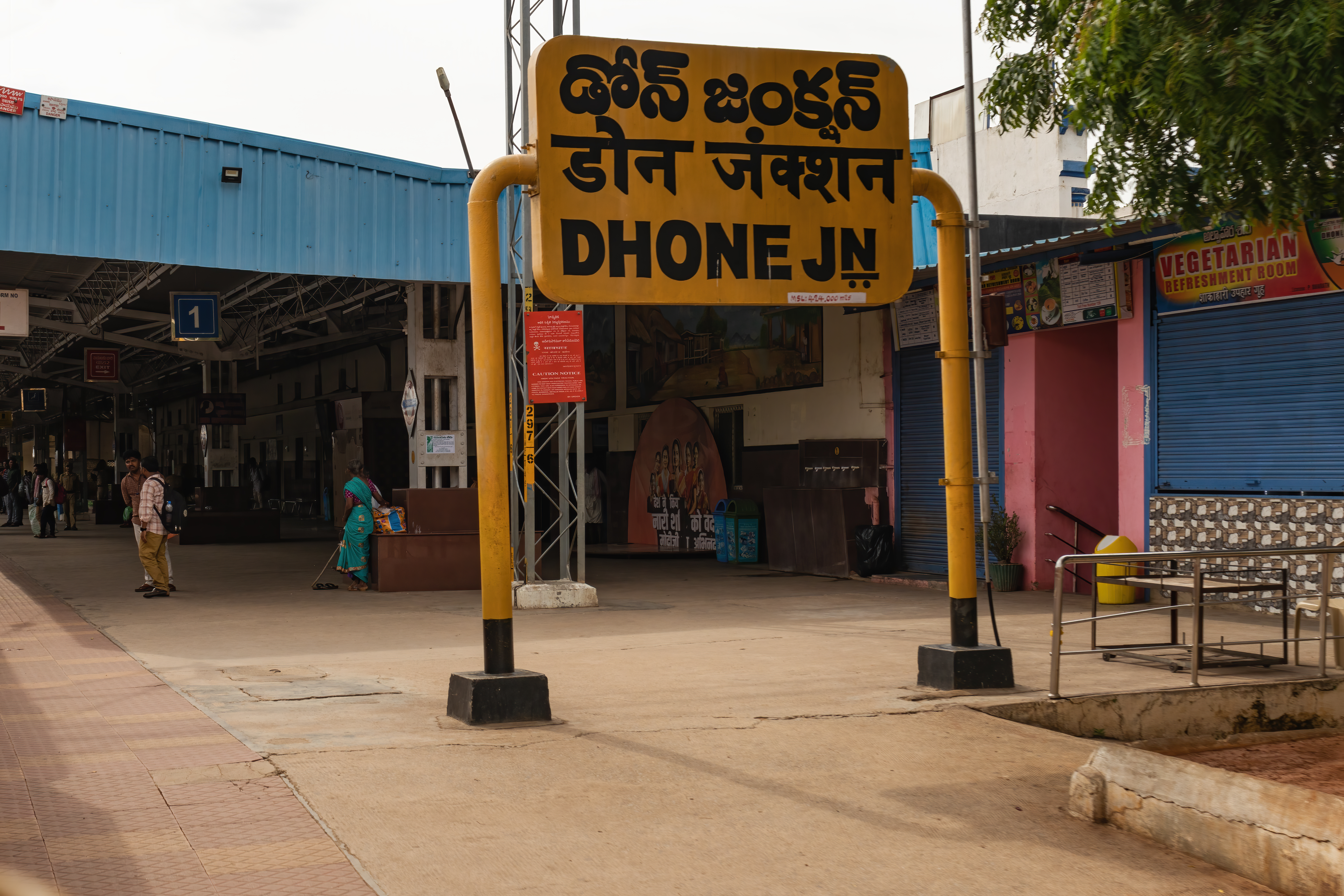
- Dhone Junction Railway station board

General information
- Location: Dhone, Nandyal district Andhra Pradesh; India
- Elevation: 425 metres (1,394 ft)
- System: Indian Railways station
- Owner: Indian Railways
- Lines: Guntakal–Dhone section, Secunderabad–Dhone section
- Platforms: 5
- Tracks: 6

Construction
- Structure type: Standard on ground
- Parking: Available

Other information
- Status: Functional
- Station code: DHNE
- Zone(s): South Coast Railway zone
- Division(s): Guntakal

Services
Preceding station	Indian Railways	Following station
Malliyala towards Guntakal	South Central Railway zone Guntakal-Nandyal line	Malkapuram towards Nandyal
Terminus	South Central Railway zone Secunderabad-Dhone line	Bogolu towards ?
Location
- Location within Andhra Pradesh Location within India

Dhone Junction railway station (station code: DHNE) is the primary railway station serving Dhone in Andhra Pradesh, India. The station falls under the jurisdiction of Guntakal division of South Coast Railways. It is a biggest railway junction in Nandyal district, Andhra Pradesh. The station has five platforms. The station is situated at junction of three lines branching towards Guntur, Kacheguda and Guntakal.

== Classification ==
Dhone Junction railway station is classified as a B–category station in the Guntakal railway division.

== Trains passing through Dhone Junction ==
Train name	Train number	Source	Destination	Runs on
SMVT Bengaluru - Gwalior Express	11805	Sir M. Visvesvaraya Terminal, Bengaluru	Gwalior	SUN
Gwalior - SMVT Bengaluru Express	11806	Gwalior	Sir M. Visvesvaraya Terminal, Bengaluru	SAT
Kongu Express	12647	Coimbatore Jn.	H Nizamuddin	SUN
AP Sampark Kranti Express	12707	Tirupati	H Nizamuddin	MON, WED, FRI
AP Sampark Kranti Express	12708	H Nizamuddin	Tirupati	WED, FRI, SUN
Tirupati–Amravati Express	12765	Tirupati	Amravati	TUE, SAT
Amravati-Tirupati Express	12766	Amravati	Tirupati	MON, THU
Seven Hills Express	12769	Tirupati	Secunderabad Jn.	MON, FRI
Seven Hills Express	12770	Secunderabad Jn.	Tirupati	TUE, FRI
Kacheguda–Mysuru Express	12786	Mysuru Jn.	Kacheguda	ALL DAYS
Venkatadri Express	12797	Kacheguda	Chittoor	ALL DAYS
Venkatadri Express	12798	Chittoor	Kacheguda	ALL DAYS
Jaipur–Mysore Superfast Express	12975	Mysuru Jn.	Jaipur Jn.	THU, SAT
Mysore-Jaipur Superfast Express	12976	Jaipur Jn.	Mysuru Jn.	MON, WED
Chennai–Nagarsol Express	16003	Chennai Central	Nagarsol	SUN
Nagarsol-Chennai Express	16004	Nagarsol	Chennai Central	MON
Kacheguda–Nagercoil Weekly Express	16353	Kacheguda	Nagercoil Jn.	WED
Nagercoil-Kacheguda Weekly Express	16354	Nagercoil Jn.	Kacheguda	TUE
Kacheguda-Yesvantpur Express	16570	Kacheguda	Yesvantpur Jn.	TUE, THU, SAT
Yesvantpur–Kacheguda Express	16569	Yesvantpur Jn.	Kacheguda	MON, WED, FRI
Rameswaram–Okha Express	16733	Rameswaram	Okha	FRI
Okha-Rameswaram Express	16734	Okha	Rameswaram	TUE
Kondaveedu Express	17211	Machilipatnam	Yesvantpur Jn.	MON, WED, FRI
Kondaveedu Express	17212	Yesvantpur Jn.	Machilipatnam	TUE, THU, SAT
Amaravati Express	17225	Vijayawada Jn.	Hubballi Jn.	ALL DAYS
Amaravati Express	17226	Hubballi Jn.	Vijayawada Jn.	ALL DAYS
Prashanti Nilayam Express	17603	Kacheguda	Yelahanka Jn.	ALL DAYS
Prashanti Nilayam Express	17604	Yelahanka Jn.	Kacheguda	ALL DAYS
Mangaluru Central–Kacheguda Express	17605	Mangalore Central	Kacheguda	WED, SAT
Kacheguda-Mangaluru Central Express	17606	Kacheguda	Mangaluru Central	TUE, FRI
Kacheguda–Madurai Weekly Express	17615	Kacheguda	Madurai Jn.	SAT
Madurai-Kacheguda Weekly Express	17616	Madurai Jn.	Kacheguda	SUN
Chengalpattu-Kacheguda Express	17651	Chengalpattu Jn.	Kacheguda	ALL DAYS
Kacheguda–Chengalpattu Express	17652	Kacheguda	Chengalpattu Jn.	ALL DAYS
Amaravati Express	18047	Shalimar	Vasco-Da-Gama	MON, TUE, THU, SAT
Amaravati Express	18048	Vasco-Da-Gama	Shalimar	TUE, THU, FRI, SUN
Prashanti Express	18463	Bhubaneswar	KSR Bengaluru	ALL DAYS
Prashanti Express	18464	KSR Bengaluru	Bhubaneswar	ALL DAYS
Yesvantpur–Lucknow Express	22683	Yesvantpur Jn.	Lucknow	MON
Lucknow-Yesvantpur Express	22684	Lucknow	Yesvantpur Jn.	THU
HWH SSPN EXPRESS	22831	HOWRAH JN	SAI P NILAYAM	WED
HOWRAH EXP	22832	SAI P NILAYAM	HOWRAH JN	FRI
PURI YPR G RATH	22883	PURI	YESVANTPUR JN	FRI
PURI GARIB RATH	22884	YESVANTPUR JN	PURI	SAT
YPR JBP EXP	12193	YESVANTPUR JN	JABALPUR	SUN
JBP YPR SUP EXP	12194	JABALPUR	YESVANTPUR JN	SAT
WAINGANGA EXP	12251	YESVANTPUR JN	KORBA	TUE, FRI
WAINGANGA EXP	12252	KORBA	YESVANTPUR JN	THU, SUN
BANGALORE EXP	12785	KACHEGUDA	MYSURU JN	ALL DAYS
VIJAYAWADA PASS	56503	BENGALURU CANT	VIJAYAWADA JN	ALL DAYS
VSG HYB EXP	17022	VASCO DA GAMA	HYDERABAD DECAN	FRI
HYB VSG EXPRESS	17021	HYDERABAD DECAN	VASCO DA GAMA	THU
HUBLI PASS	56501	VIJAYAWADA JN	HUBBALLI JN	ALL DAYS
BZA BNC PASS	56504	VIJAYAWADA JN	BENGALURU CANT	ALL DAYS
KCG KJM SPL	07603	KACHEGUDA	KRISHNARAJAPURM	SUN
UBL BZA PASSR	56502	HUBBALLI JN	VIJAYAWADA JN	ALL DAYS
GNT KCG PASS	57306	GUNTUR JN	KACHEGUDA	ALL DAYS
KCGGNT PASS	57305	KACHEGUDA	GUNTUR JN	ALL DAYS
KJM KCG EXP	07604	KRISHNARAJAPURM	KACHEGUDA	MON
KCG PASS	57326	GUNTUR JN	KACHEGUDA	ALL DAYS
AWB QLN SPL	07505	NIZAMABAD	ERNAKULAM JN	SUN
ERS NED EXPRESS	07504	ERNAKULAM JN	H SAHIB NANDED	MON
PASSENGER	57425	KACHEGUDA	GUNTAKAL JN	ALL DAYS
QLN NZB EXP	07144	KOLLAM JN	NIZAMABAD	THU, SUN
COA SSPN SPL	07248	KAKINADA PORT	SAI P NILAYAM	SAT
DHNE BPL SPL	07423	DHONE	KAZIPET JN	THU
RC CCT SPL	07246	RAICHUR	KAKINADA TOWN	MON, THU, SAT
NZB QLN SPL	07613	NIZAMABAD	KOLLAM JN	FRI, SUN
QLN NZB EXPRESS	07614	KOLLAM JN	NIZAMABAD	TUE, FRI
TPTY AWB SPL	07410	TIRUPATI	AURANGABAD	TUE
AK QLN SPL	07507	AKOLA JN	KOLLAM JN	SAT
KRNT PASS	77414	GUNTAKAL JN	KURNOOL CITY	ALL DAYS
ADB QLN SPL	07509	ADILABAD	KOLLAM JN	THU
DHNE PASS	57328	GUNTUR JN	DHONE	ALL DAYS
GNT PASS	57327	DHONE	GUNTUR JN	ALL DAYS
TPTY ADB SPL	07407	TIRUPATI	ADILABAD	TUE
CCT RC SPL	07245	KAKINADA TOWN	RAICHUR	WED, FRI, SUN
RC BZA SPL	07244	RAICHUR	VIJAYAWADA JN	SUN
VSG HWH EXP	07321	VASCO DA GAMA	HOWRAH JN	FRI
