= Secunderabad–Dhone section =

Railway line in India

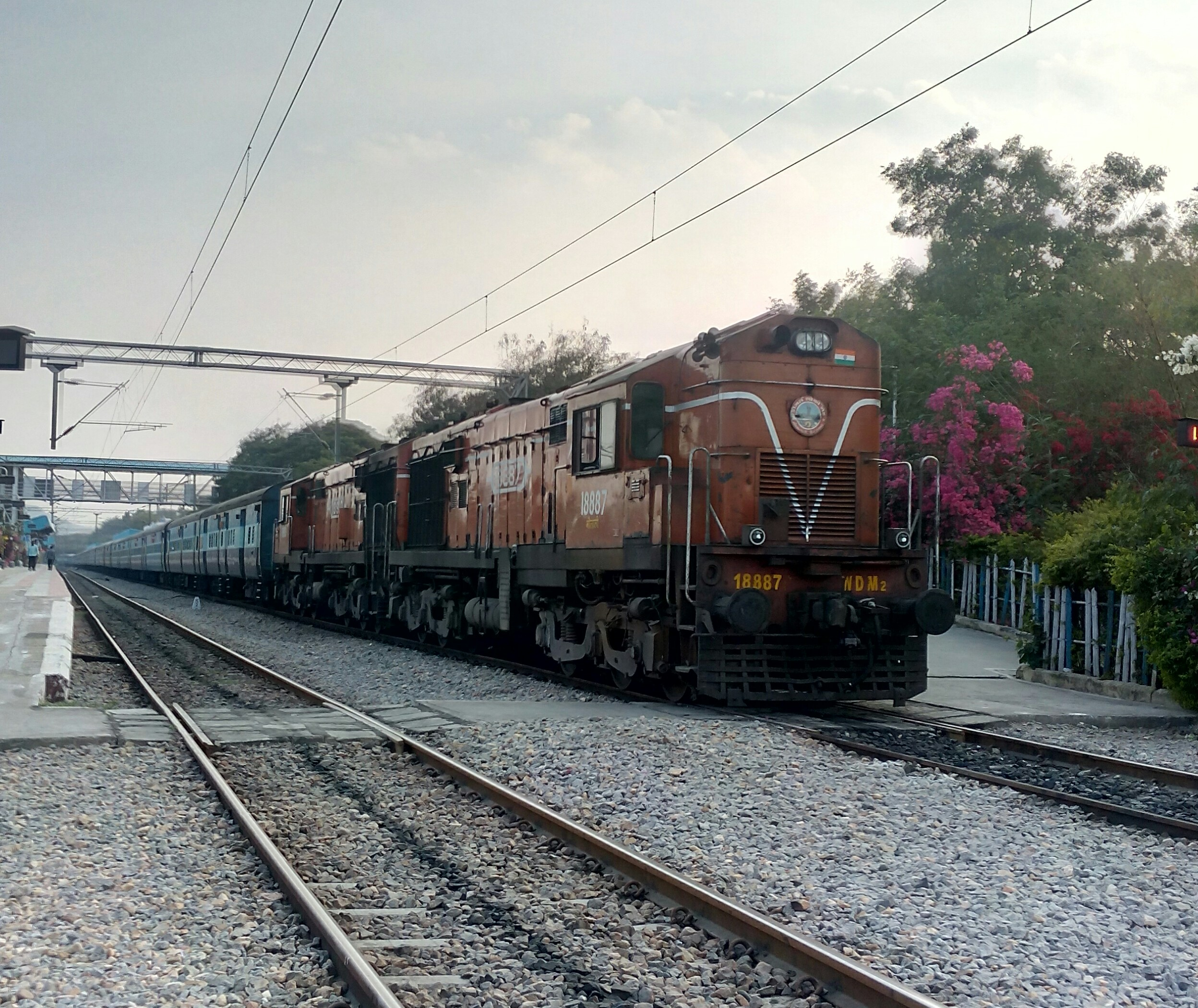
- Venkatadri Express is one of the daily running train in this section

Overview
- Status: Operational
- Owner: Indian Railways
- Locale: Telangana, Andhra Pradesh
- Termini: Secunderabad Junction; Dhone Junction

Service
- Services: Mahabubnagar-Munirabad line
- Operator: South Central Railway

History
- Opened: 1929; 97 years ago

Technical
- Track length: 295 km (183 mi)
- Track gauge: 5 ft 6 in (1,676 mm) broad gauge
- Electrification: Yes
Secunderabad–Dhone Section Map
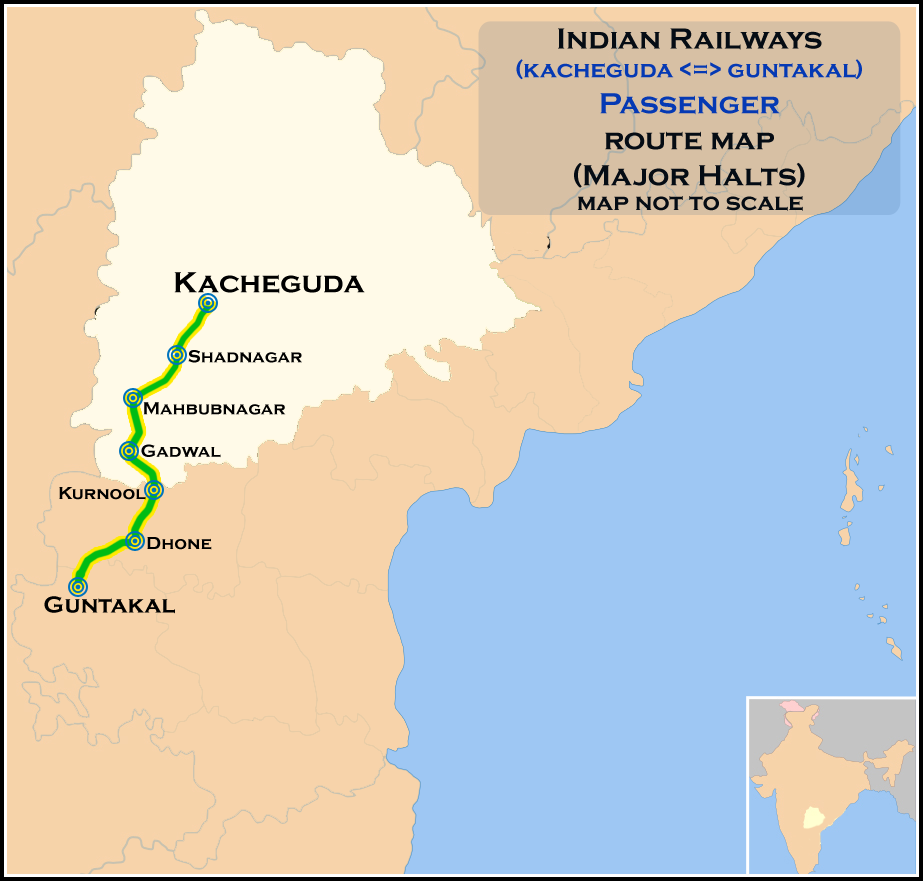

Secunderabad–Dhone section is an electrified single-track railway section in Hyderabad railway division of South Central Railway zone. It connects Hyderabad of Telangana with Dhone in Andhra Pradesh. The section is a part of Train Collision Avoidance System.project

== History ==
This line construction was started in 1922 and completed in 1929 as a metre-gauge railway line during British era. This metre-gauge line was converted into broad-gauge railway line in between 1993 and 1998. As of March 2023, electrification is in progress from Gadwal to Kurnool. The doubling of this line was approved in 2023.

== Route ==
This route starts from Secunderabad Junction and passes through Mahbubnagar, Gadwal, Kurnool City and joins Dhone Junction.
