= Chittoor railway station =

Railway station in Andhra Pradesh, India

Chittoor
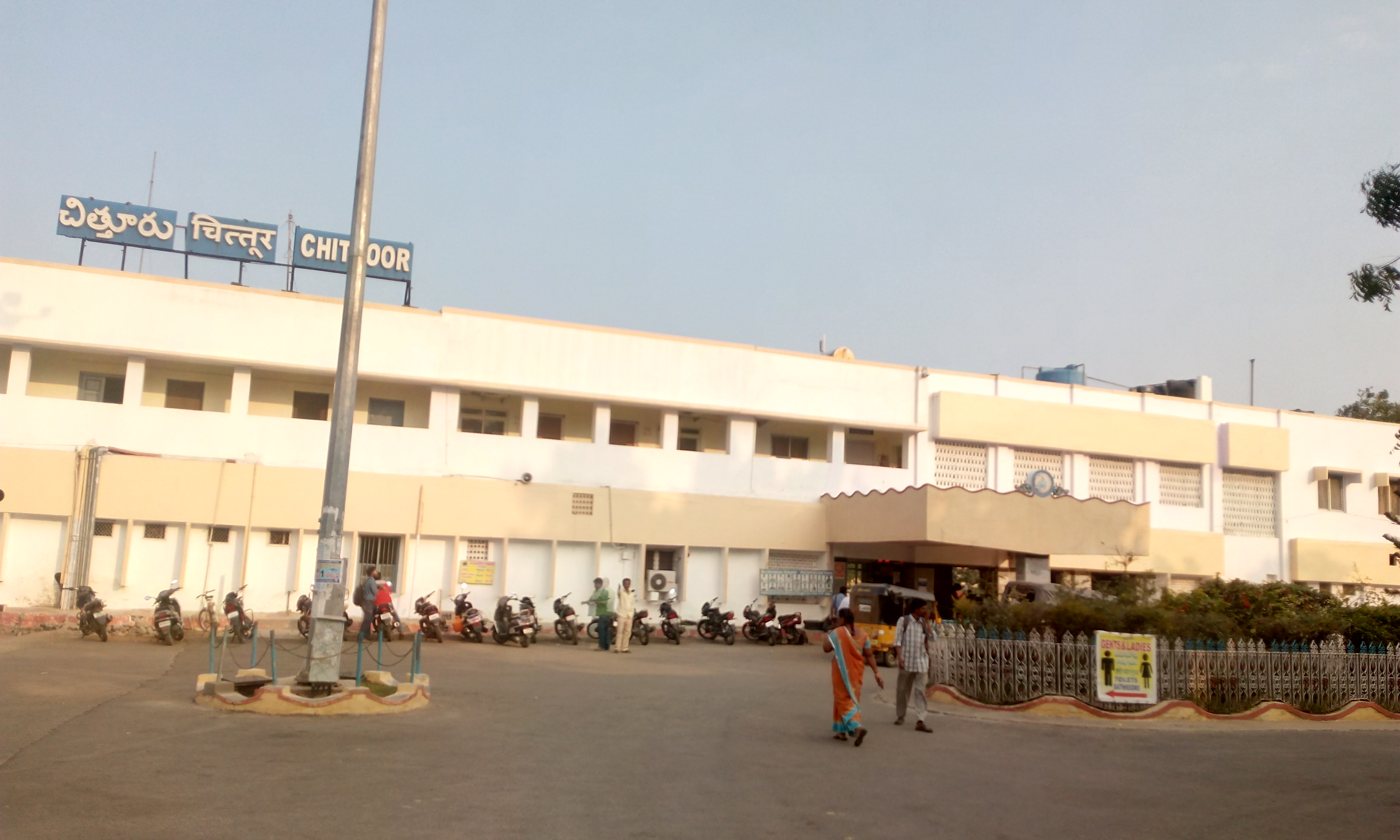
- Chittoor railway station entrance

General information
- Location: Prakasham High Road, Chittoor, Andhra Pradesh; India
- Coordinates: 13.2192°N 79.1035°E
- System: Express train, Passenger train and Commuter rail
- Operator: Indian Railways
- Line: Gudur–Katpadi branch line
- Platforms: 3
- Tracks: 5

Construction
- Structure type: On ground
- Parking: yes
- Accessible: Disabled access

Other information
- Status: Active
- Station code: CTO
- Zone(s): South Coast Railway zone
- Division(s): Guntakal

Services
| Preceding station | Indian Railways | Following station |
|---|---|---|
| Muthirevulu towards ? | Gudur–Katpadi Branch line | Siddampalli towards ? |
Location
- Location within Andhra Pradesh Location within India

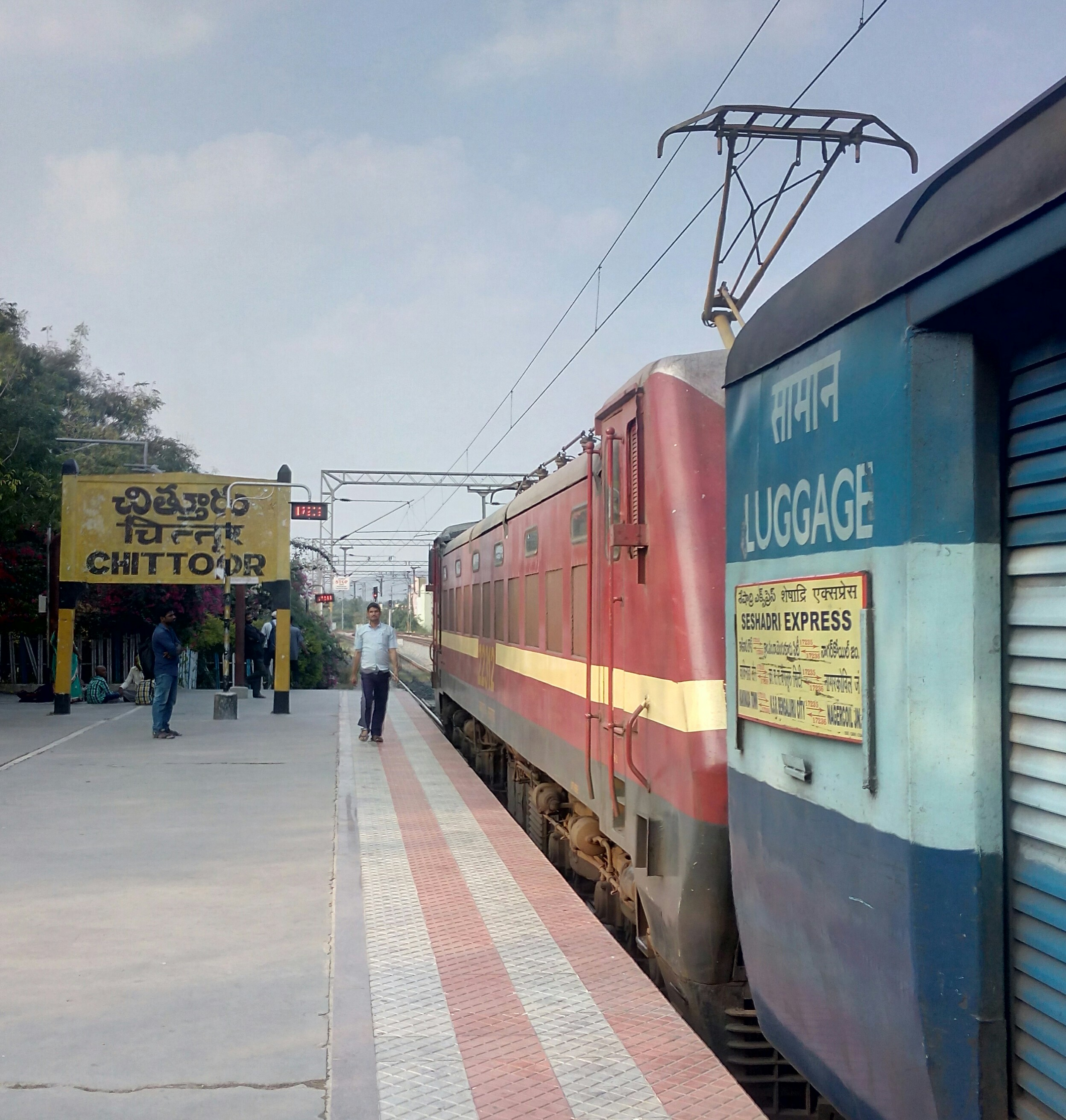
Seshadri express at Chittoor

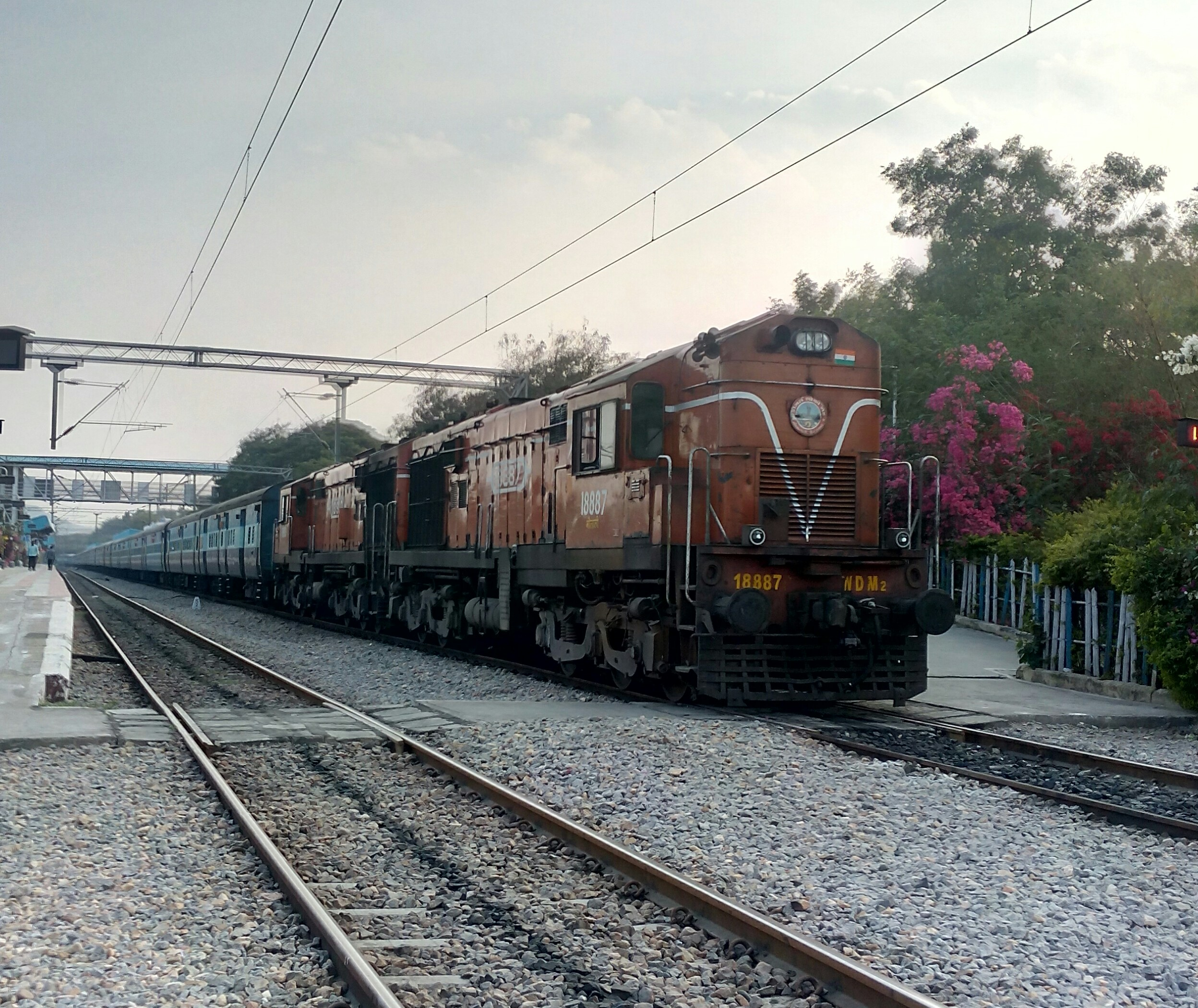
Venkatadri Express ready to leave Chittoor railway station

Chittoor railway station (station code:CTO) is an Indian railway station in Chittoor city of Andhra Pradesh. It lies on the Gudur–Katpadi branch line and is administered under Guntakal railway division of South Coast Railway zone.

== Classification ==
Chittoor railway station is classified as a B–category station in the Guntakal railway division.
