= Hindupur railway station =

Railway station in Andhra Pradesh, India

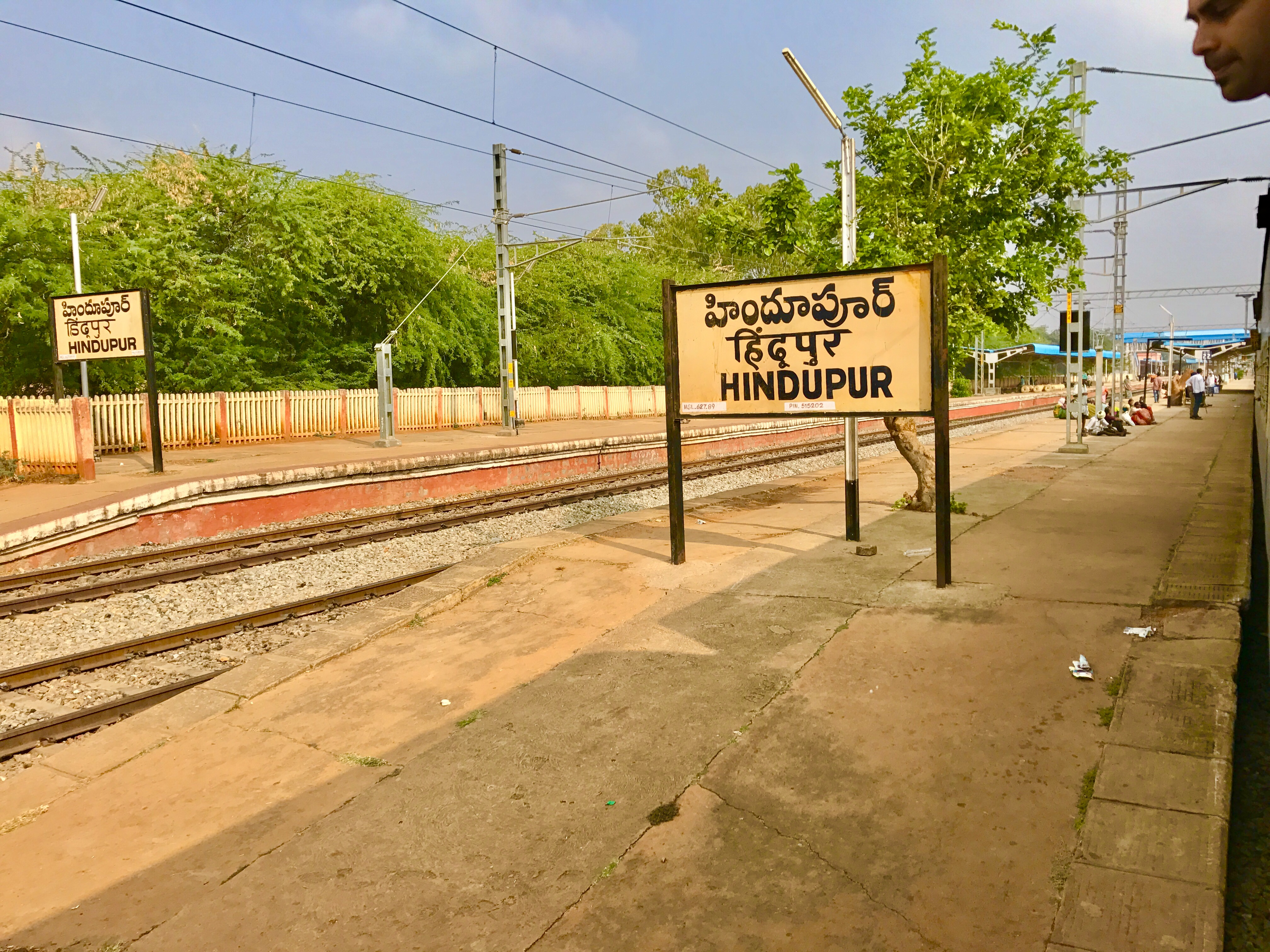
- Hindupur station board

General information
- Location: Lakshmipuram, Hindupur, Andhra Pradesh; India
- Coordinates: 13.8187°N 77.5000°E
- Elevation: 635 metres (2,083 ft)
- System: Indian Railways station
- Owner: Indian Railways
- Operator: Bangalore railway division
- Line: Guntakal–Bangalore section
- Platforms: 4
- Tracks: 8 (construction – electrification of single broad gauge)
- Connections: Auto stand

Construction
- Structure type: Standard (on-ground station)
- Parking: yes
- Cycle facilities: No

Other information
- Status: Functioning
- Station code: HUP
- Fare zone: South Western Railway
Location
- Location within Andhra Pradesh Location within India

Hindupur railway station (station code:HUP) is a railway station located in Hindupur, Sri Sathya Sai district, Andhra Pradesh. Its code is HUP. 2 Passenger Trains starts from Hindupur to Bangalore and Gunakal in morning and same returns to Hindupur in evening. Hindupur - Kadiri new route survey done and later cancelled by lack of support from local political interest. The station is administered under Bangalore division of South Western Railway zone. This Railway Station belongs to NSG-4 category
