= Gooty Junction railway station =

Railway Station in Andhra Pradesh

Gooty Junction
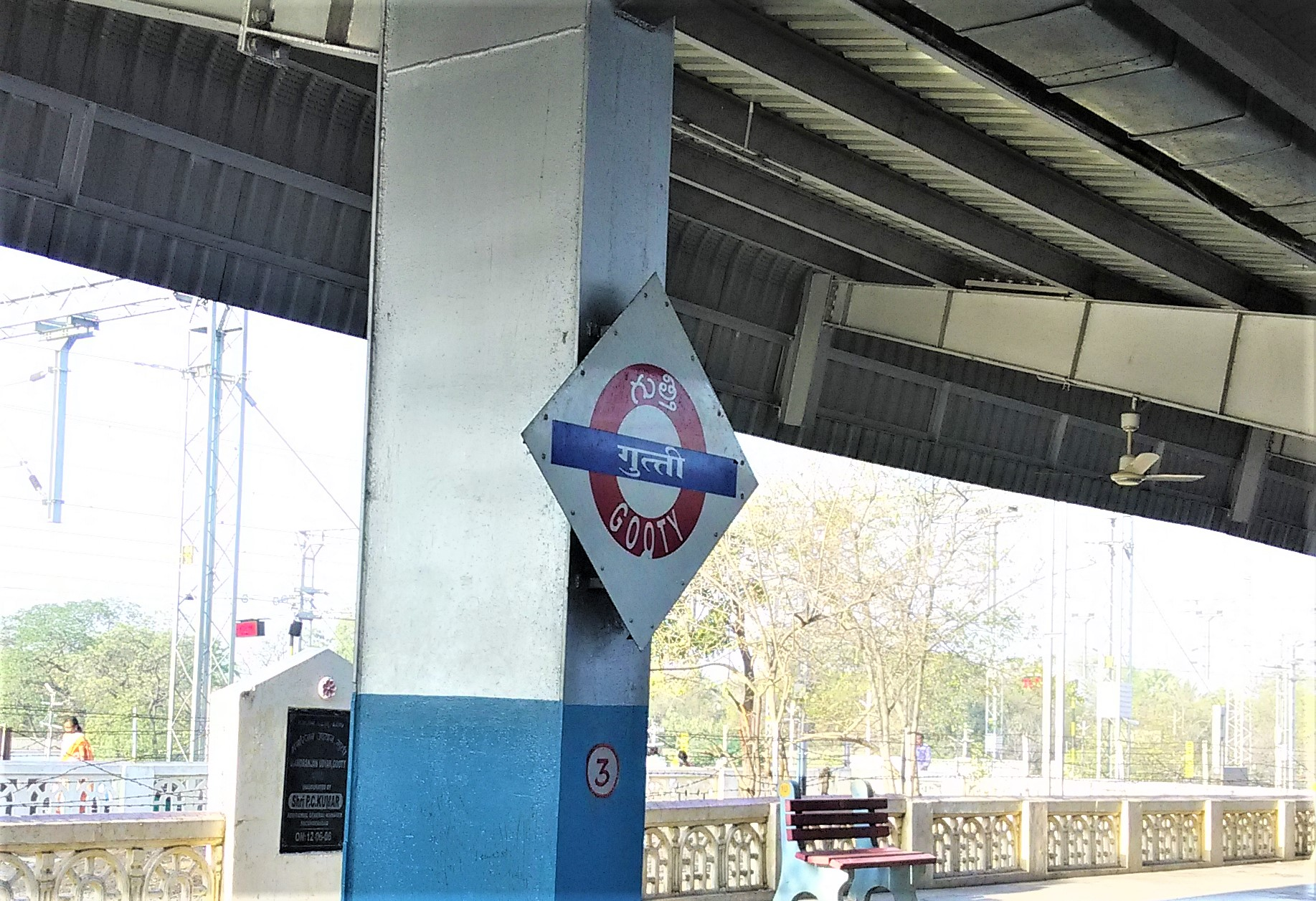

General information
- Location: NH-44, Gooty, Anantapur district, Andhra Pradesh; India
- Elevation: 370 metres (1,210 ft)
- System: Indian Railways station
- Owner: Indian Railways
- Operator: South Coast Railway
- Lines: Dharmavaram – Gooty line Chennai – Mumbai line Gooty – Dhone line
- Platforms: 2
- Tracks: 5

Construction
- Structure type: Standard on ground
- Parking: Yes
- Cycle facilities: Yes
- Accessible: Available

Other information
- Status: Functional
- Station code: GY
- Zone(s): South Coast Railway
- Division(s): Guntakal
Location
- Location within Andhra Pradesh Location within India

Gooty Junction railway station (station code: GY) is the primary railway station serving Gooty in Andhra Pradesh, India. It falls under the jurisdiction of the Guntakal division of South Coast Railway.

== Structure and amenities ==
Gooty Junction is located on the Guntakal–Chennai Egmore section, a part of the Mumbai–Chennai railway route, and sits at the junction of 4 lines branching towards Dharmavaram Junction, Dhone Junction, Renigunta Junction, and Guntakal Junction. It is home to the Diesel Loco Shed, Gooty, one of South Coast Railway's five locomotive sheds.

The station has two platforms. It is situated on the Bengaluru–Hyderabad NH-44 (previously known as NH-7), the Ankola–Bellary–Gooty NH-63, and the Gulbarga–Gooty NH-150.

== Classification ==
Gooty railway station is classified as a B–category station in the Guntakal railway division.

== Gooty bypass line ==
In 2022, South Central Railway commissioned a 3.2 km (2.0 mi) railway line to bypass Gooty Junction at a cost of ₹43 crore (US$4.5 million). It connects the Gooty - Dharmavaram main line in the south with the Gooty - Renigunta main line in the east, allowing trains to travel without having to reverse at Gooty Junction. The project also included the addition of an electronic interlocking system at Gooty South and Gooty Junction cabins.
