= Mahbubnagar railway station =

Railway station in Telangana, India

Mahbubnagar
- Mahabubnagar Railway Station

General information
- Location: Mahbubnagar Railway Station, Mahabubnagar, Mahabubnagar district, Telangana; India
- Coordinates: 16.7589°N 78.0010°E
- Owner: Government of India
- Operator: Indian Railways
- Line: Mahabubnagar-Munirabad
- Platforms: 3

Construction
- Structure type: At grade
- Accessible: Yes

Other information
- Status: Functioning
- Station code: MBNR
- Zone(s): South Central Railway
- Division(s): Hyderabad

Services
Preceding station	Indian Railways	Following station
Yenugonda towards ?	Hyderabad–Dhone section	Mahbubnagar Town Halt towards ?
Location
- Location within Telangana Location within India

Mahbubnagar railway station (station code: MBNR) is a fifth grade non-suburban (NSG–5) category Indian railway station in Hyderabad railway division of South Central Railway zone. It serves the city of Mahabubnagar in the Indian state of Telangana. It lies on the Secunderabad–Dhone section of the zone. It was selected as one of the 21 stations to be developed under Amrit Bharat Stations scheme.

== Structure and amenities ==
The station has rooftop solar panels installed by the Indian railways, along with various railway stations and service buildings in the country, as a part of sourcing 500 MW solar energy.

The railway station is part of the Amrit Bharat Station Scheme. The Mahabubnagar–Munirabad railway line, providing connectivity to Karnataka is under construction and is expected to be completed by the year 2025.
