= Kurnool City railway station =

Railway Station in Andhra Pradesh

Kurnool City
- Kurnool City railway station entrance.

General information
- Location: Station Road, Narasimha Reddy Nagar, Kurnool, Andhra Pradesh; India
- Coordinates: 15°49′48″N 78°03′00″E
- Elevation: 293 metres (961 ft)
- System: Indian Railways
- Owner: Indian Railways
- Operator: South Central Railway zone
- Line: Secunderabad–Dhone section
- Platforms: 3
- Tracks: 5 broad gauge

Construction
- Structure type: At grade
- Parking: Available

Other information
- Status: Functioning
- Station code: KRNT
- Zone(s): South Central Railway
- Division(s): Hyderabad

Passengers
- 12,500
Location
- Location within Andhra Pradesh

Kurnool City railway station, formerly Kurnool Town railway station (station code: KRNT), is located in the Indian state of Andhra Pradesh. It serves Kurnool in the Kurnool district. It is under the administrative control of the Hyderabad Division of the South Central Railway zone of the Indian Railways.

== Station category ==
Kurnool is a category station, and one of the ten model stations in the Hyderabad Division of South-Central Railway.

- Track: Single Electric Line
- Station Type: Regular
- Address: Station Road, Narasimha Reddy Nagar, Kurnool, Andhra Pradesh 518004
- Elevation: 293 m above sea level
- Zone: South Central Railway
- Division: Hyderabad
- Nearest airport: Kurnool Airport [23 KM]
- No. of platforms: 3
- Halting Trains: 90
- Originating Trains: 7
- Terminating Trains: 7

== Structure and amenities ==
The station has rooftop solar panels installed by the Indian railways, along with various railway stations and service buildings in the country, as a part of sourcing 500 MW solar energy. Recently, Indian Railway refurbished the station at a cost of around 15 crore. Under the modernization programme, the station entrance, waiting hall, retiring rooms, and platforms were renovated. Provisions for washable aprons have also been added. Provisions for refreshments room were provided for travellers to get beverages at any time.

The station caters to an average of 12,500 passengers daily, and has several features to help with accessibility. There are two lifts, a footbridge, and escalators. Passenger information displays and signage are also available, as well as butterfly-type shelters to allow the passengers to sit and wait until the scheduled arrival of trains. In addition to these, the station building and some of the walls have been painted and beautified to display the art and culture of the local place.

The outer part of the railway station is also being modernized. It includes the shifting of substation, water tank catering to railway station needs, and postal service to decongest the railway station for movement of vehicles coming to and going from station. Construction of tensile modelled structures for auto rickshaw parking, car parking, pick up and drop off passengers place, etc. is in progress. Upgrades for the drainage system is also in progress to create a smooth flow of water during wet conditions. Additional provisions include renovating the footpath area and the space deck portico.

These renovations and modifications have made the Kurnool Railway station look alike and upgraded to airport standards.

== Rail coach factory ==
A rail coach factory is being established at Kurnool. The foundation stone was laid on 24 February 2014 and received the Railway Minster's nod.

== See also ==
- List of railway stations in India
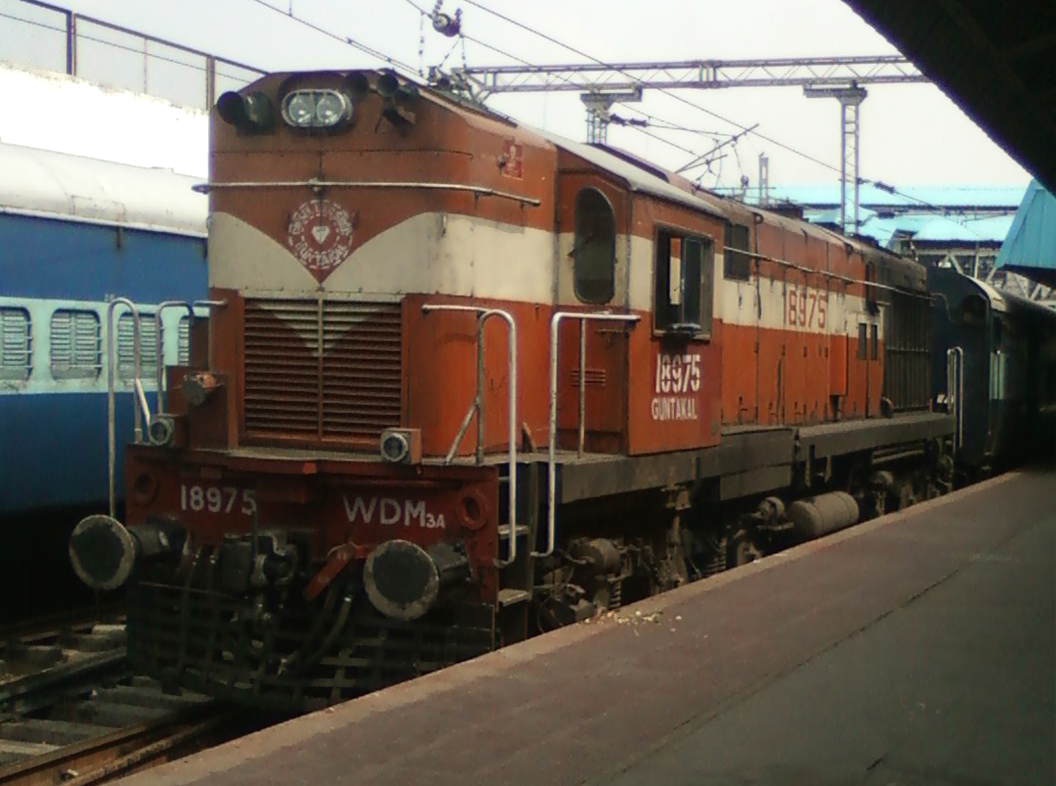
  Kurnool city – Secunderabad Intercity Express with a Guntakal-based WDM3A locomotive
