= Kacheguda railway station =

Train station in Hyderabad, Telangana, India

Kacheguda railway station Kacheguda, Hyderabad
- Kacheguda Railway Station

General information
- Location: Hyderabad, Telangana; India
- Coordinates: 17.38956°N 78.49976°E
- Elevation: 543 m (1,781 ft)
- System: Indian Railways and Hyderabad MMTS station
- Owner: Indian Railways
- Operator: South Central Railways
- Line: Kacheguda - Chennai Egmore Line
- Platforms: 5
- Tracks: 11
- Connections: Auto stand, Taxi stand

Construction
- Structure type: At grade
- Parking: Yes
- Accessible: Available

Other information
- Status: Functional
- Station code: KCG
- Zone(s): South Central Railway
- Division(s): Hyderabad

History
- Opened: 1916; 110 years ago
- Electrified: 2003; 23 years ago
Location
- Location within Hyderabad Location within Telangana Location within India

Platform No 1 - Kacheguda Railway Station in July 2026

Kacheguda railway station (station code: KCG) is a non-suburban-2 (NSG-2) category Indian railway station in Hyderabad railway division of South Central Railway zone. It is one of the four major railway stations in Hyderabad of the Indian state of Telangana. The station was first built during the reign of Nizam Osman Ali Khan to create wider connectivity for the state to Western cities like Mumbai through the railway junction at Wadi.

Endowed with central and side domes and accompanying minarets, this station has aspects of Gothic-style architecture. The station handles trains originating for Indore, Bhopal, Aurangabad, Tirupati, Bangalore, Mysuru, Chennai, Delhi, Nanded, Nizamabad, Mangalore, Madurai, and more. Housing many modern passenger amenities, this station now serves as the Headquarters station of the Hyderabad railway division of South Central Railway.

In addition to the new terminus building that is constructed which also houses a miniature Rail museum and branded outlets like Café Coffee Day the Zonal Railway has identified the station for development of Multi Functional Complex adjoining to the station building.

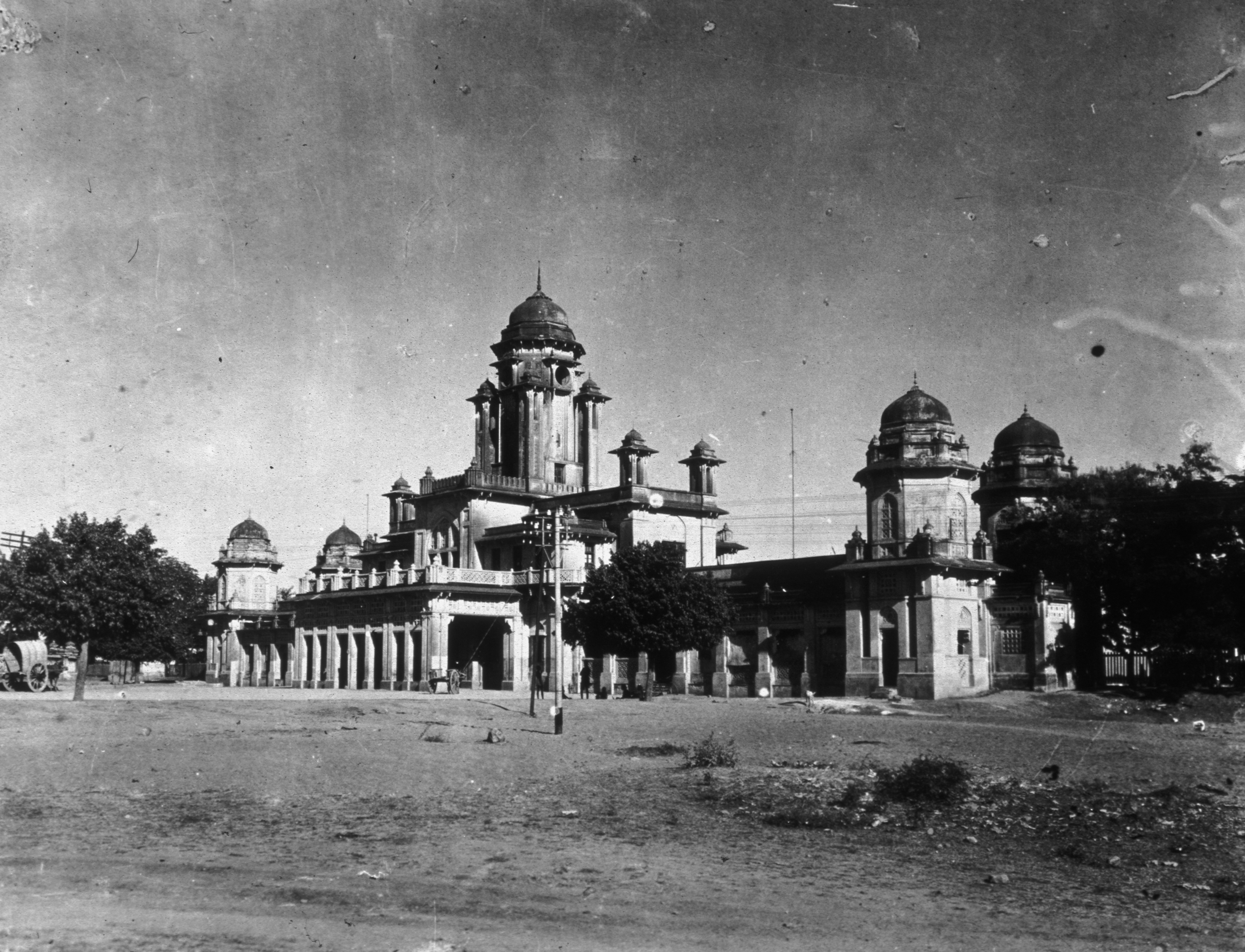
Kacheguda railway station in 1922

The facility is getting developed on public-private partnership basis and the bidding process is over and the private concessionaire has been appointed for the project.

== History ==
Constructed in 1916, by the Nizam of Hyderabad Asaf Jah VII, this Station was the Headquarters of the then Nizam's Guaranteed State Railway.

== Classification ==
Kacheguda railway station is classified as an A1–category station in the Hyderabad railway division.

== Originating express trains ==
Train No.	Train Name	Destination	Departure	Running	Route
20703	Kacheguda - Yesvantpur Vande Bharat Express	Yesvantpur Junction	05:45	Except Wed	Kacheguda, Mahabubnagar, Kurnool City, Anantapur, Dharmavaram Jn., Yeshwantpur Jn. (Bengaluru)
12789	Kacheguda - Murdeshwar SF Express	Murdeshwar	06:05	Tue, Fri	Mahabubnagar, Gadwal, Kurnool City, Dhone Jn., Gooty Jn., Cuddapah, Renigunta Jn., Katpadi Jn., Jolarpettai, Salem Jn., Erode Jn., Coimbatore Jn., Palakkad, Shoranur Jn., Kozhikode, Kannur, Kasaragod, Mangaluru Central (MAQ) , Surathkal, Udupi (Odipu).
22715	Kacheguda - Madurai Weekly SF Express	Madurai Jn.	06:05	Sat	Mahabubnagar, Kurnool City, Dhone Jn., Anantapur, Dharmavaram Jn., Chittor, Katpadi Jn., Jolarpettai, Salem Jn., Erode Jn., Karur, Tiruchchirapalli, Dindigul Jn.
17064	Kacheguda - Manmad Ajanta Express	Manmad	06:30	All Days	
17693	Kacheguda - Raichur MEMU Express	Raichur	05:25	Except Sat	Mahabubnagar, Gadwal Jn.
17652	Kacheguda - Chengalpattu Express	Chengalpattu	17:00	All Days	Mahabubnagar, Kurnool City, Dhone Jn., Gooty Jn., Cuddapah, Renigunta Jn., Arakkonam Jn., Chennai Egmore, Tambaram
17435	Kacheguda - Kurnool City Express	Kurnool City	18:10	All Days	Mahabubnagar, Gadwal Jn.
12785	Kacheguda - Ashokapuram Express	Ashokapuram	19:05	All Days	Mahabubnagar, Kurnool City, Dhone Jn., Gooty Jn., Anantapur, Dharmavaram Jn., Hindupur, Yelhanka Jn., KSR Bengaluru City Jn., Kengeri., Mandya
12785	Kacheguda - Bhagat Ki Kothi Express	Bhagat Ki Kothi (Jodhpur)	23:50	All Days	Nizamabad Jn., Hazur Sahib Nanded, Purna Jn., Hingoli deccan, Washim, Akola Jn., Malkapur, Burhanpur {via Bhusawal bypass line}, Khandwa Jn., Itarsi Jn., Rani Kamlapati Habibganj, Ujjain Jn., Ratlam Jn., Neemuch, Chittaurgarh Jn., Bhilwara, Ajmer Jn., Marwar Jn., Bhagat Ki Kothi
12797	Venkatadri Express	Chittor	20:05	All Days	Mahabubnagar, Kurnool City, Dhone Jn., Gooty Jn., Cuddapah, Renigunta Jn., Tirupati
17603	Kacheguda - Yelhanka Express	Yelhanka Jn.	21:05	All Days	Mahabubnagar, Kurnool City, Dhone Jn., Guntakal Jn., Gooty Jn., Anantapur, Dharmavaram Jn., Hindupur
17252	Kacheguda - Guntur Express	Guntur Jn.	21:20	All Days	Mahabubnagar, Gadwal Jn., Kurnool City, Dhone Jn., Nandyal, Cumbum, Narsaraopet
17625	Kacheguda - Repalle Delta Express	Repalle	22:10	All Days	Ghatkesar, Guntur Jn. (Via Nalgonda), Tenali Jn.

== MMTS connectivity ==
The Kacheguda railway station connects Hyderabad City with MMTS Rail Transit, and localities like Kachiguda, Barkatpura, Chaderghat, Narayanguda, Koti and Abids are accessible from this station.

- Secunderabad–Falaknuma route (SF Line)

== Trains ==
This station has four pit lines for primary maintenance of trains which are originating from here.

== Gallery ==
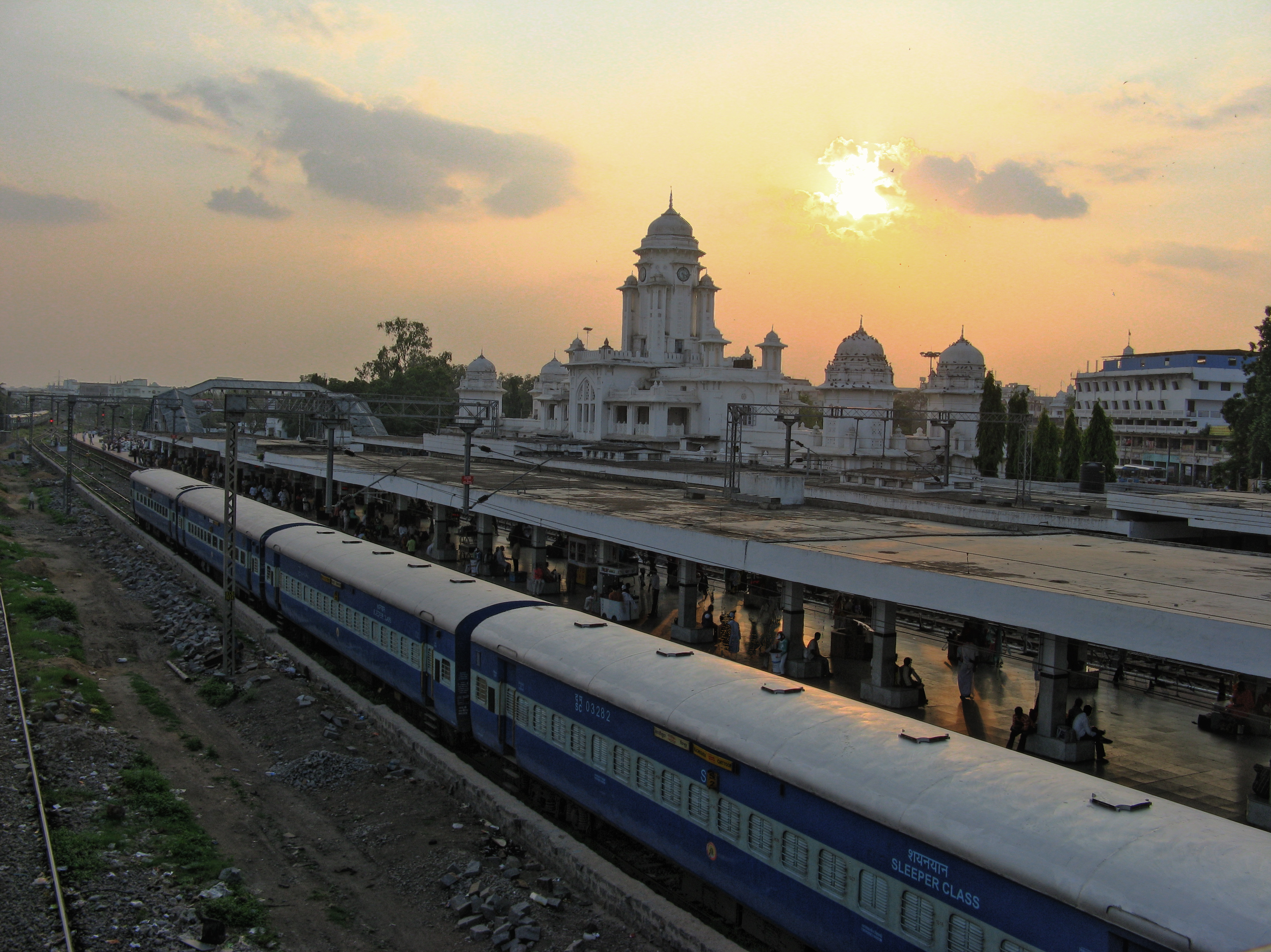
1

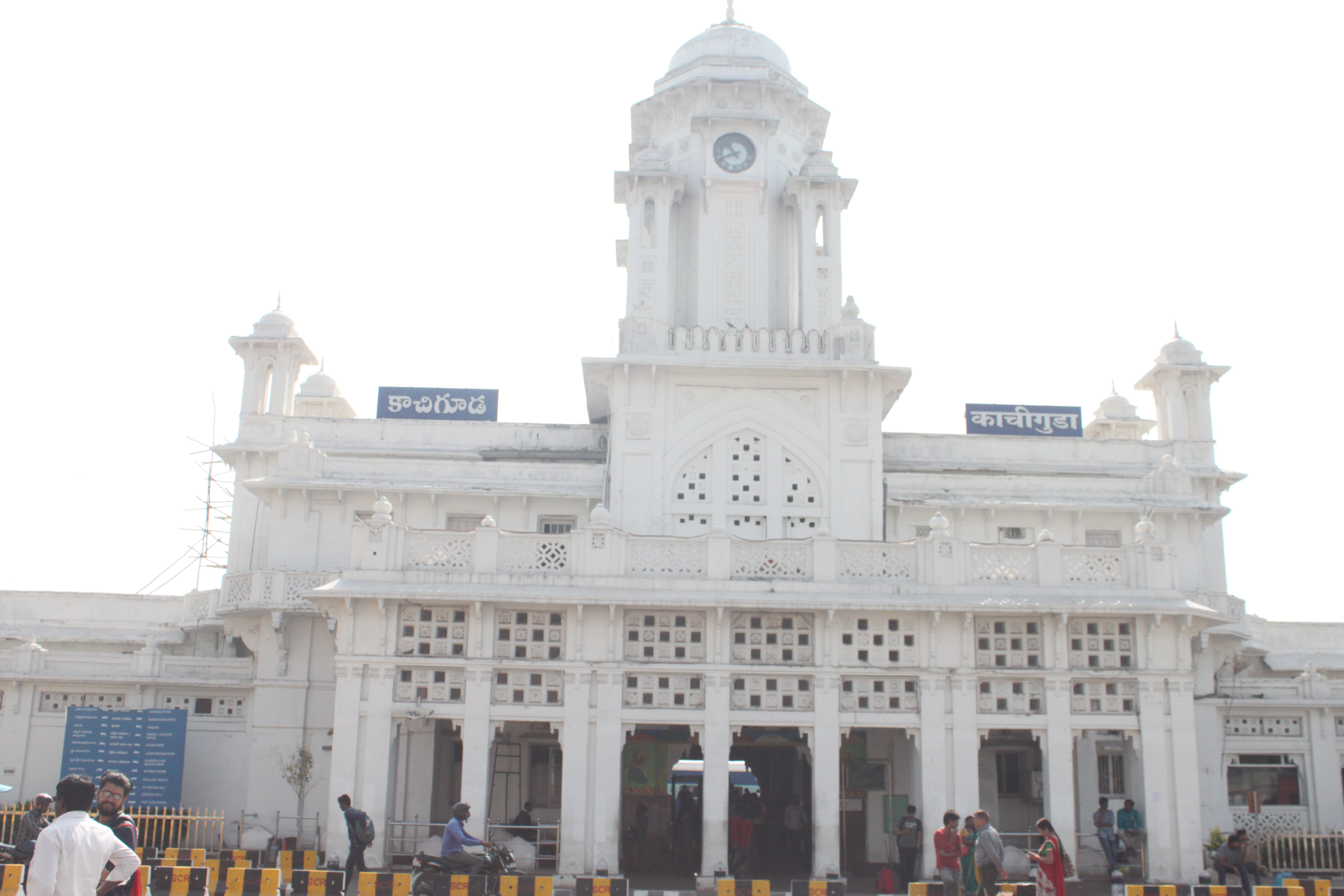
2

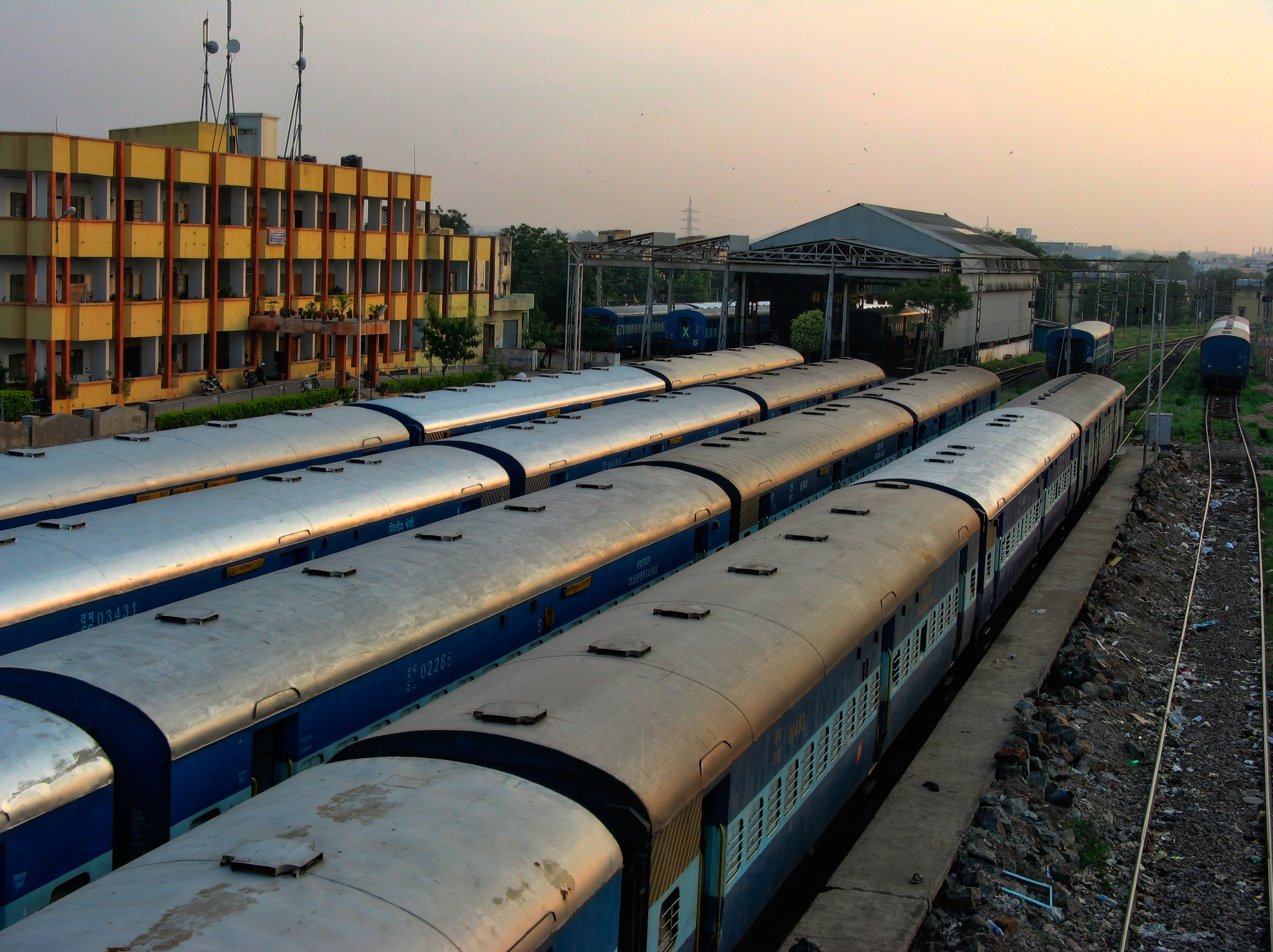
3

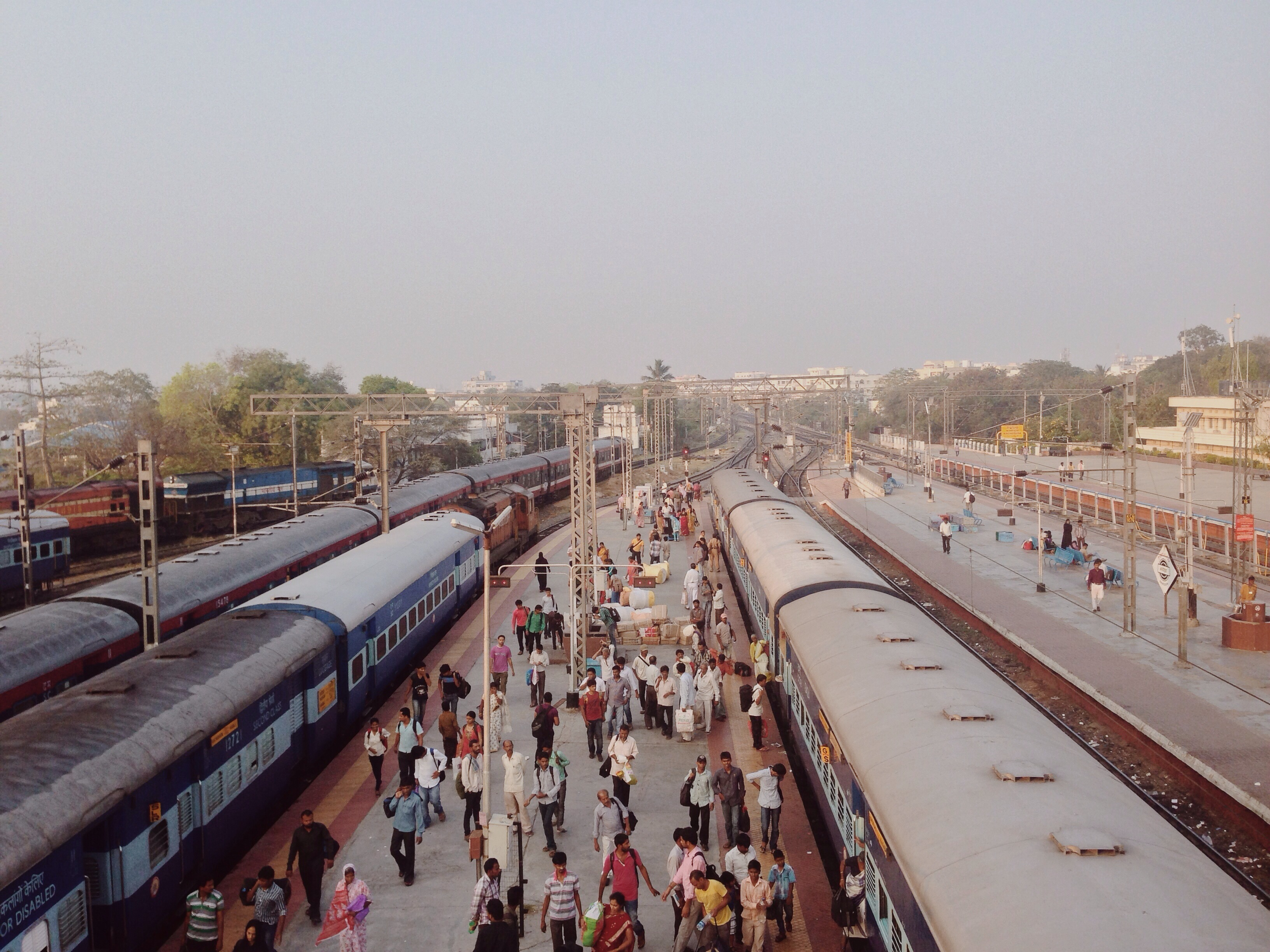
4

== See also ==
- Nizam's Guaranteed State Railway
- South Central Railway zone
- Secunderabad Junction railway station
- Hyderabad Deccan railway station
- Begumpet railway station
- Lingampally railway station
- Falaknuma railway station
- Malkajgiri railway station
