= Hazur Sahib Nanded–Dharmavaram Junction Weekly Express =

Train in India

Hazur Sahib Nanded - Dharmavaram Junction Weekly Express
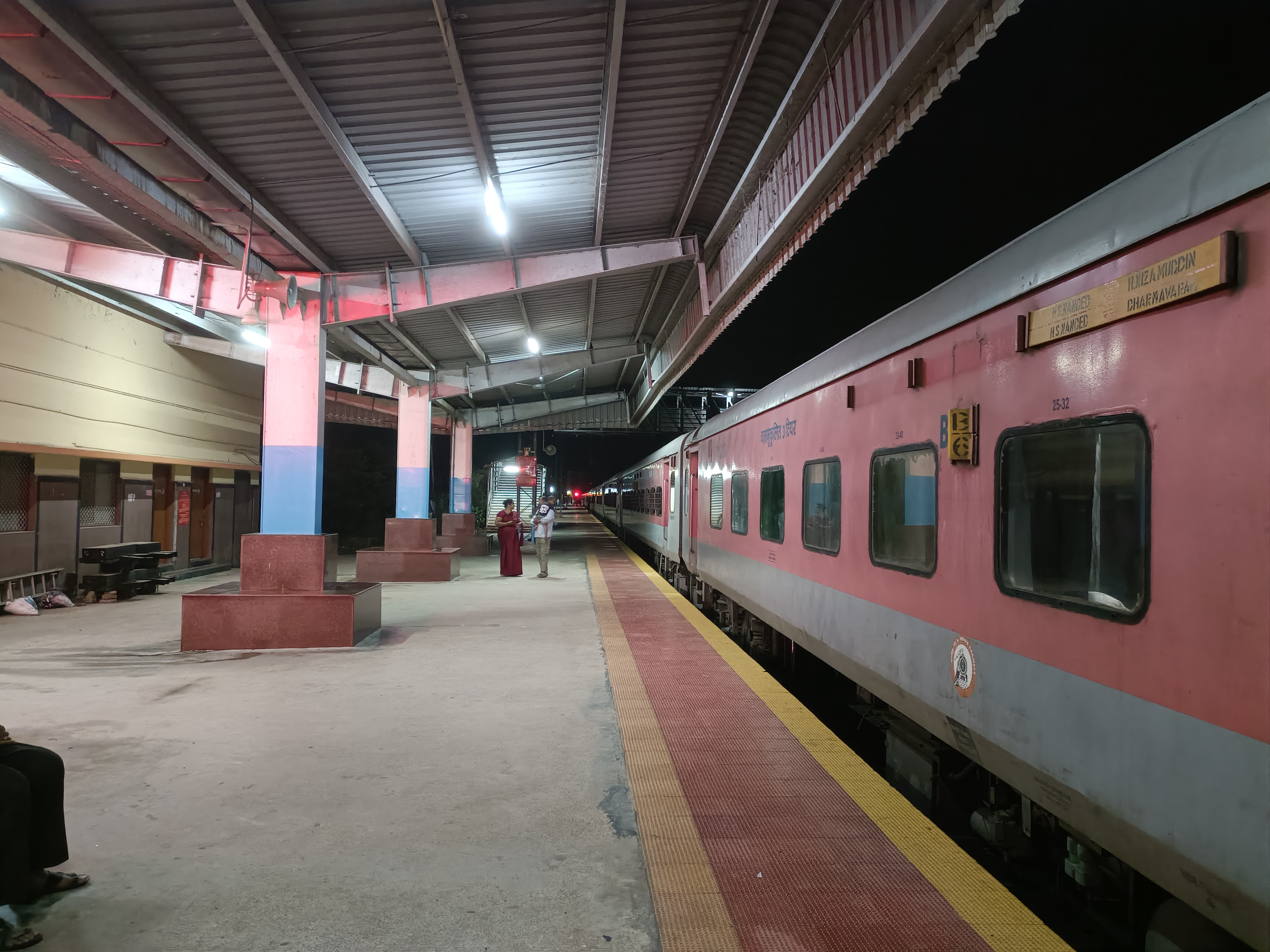
- Train No. 17635 Hazur Sahib Nanded - Dharmavaram Weekly Express at the Koratla railway station

Overview
- Service type: Express
- Status: Active
- Locale: Maharashtra, Telangana and Andhra Pradesh
- First service: 22 May 2026; 45 days ago
- Current operator: South Central (SC)

Route
- Termini: Hazur Sahib Nanded (NED); Dharmavaram Junction (DMM)
- Stops: 23
- Distance travelled: 1,235 km (767 mi)
- Average journey time: 26h 45m
- Service frequency: Weekly
- Train number: 17635 / 17636

On-board services
- Classes: General Unreserved, Sleeper Class, AC 3rd Class, AC 2nd Class
- Seating arrangements: No
- Sleeping arrangements: Yes
- Catering facilities: On-board Catering, E-Catering
- Observation facilities: Large windows
- Baggage facilities: No
- Other facilities: Below the seats

Technical
- Rolling stock: LHB coach
- Track gauge: 1,676 mm (5 ft 6 in)
- Electrification: 25 kV 50 Hz AC Overhead line
- Operating speed: 130 km/h (81 mph) maximum, 46 km/h (29 mph) average including halts.
- Track owner: Indian Railways
Route map
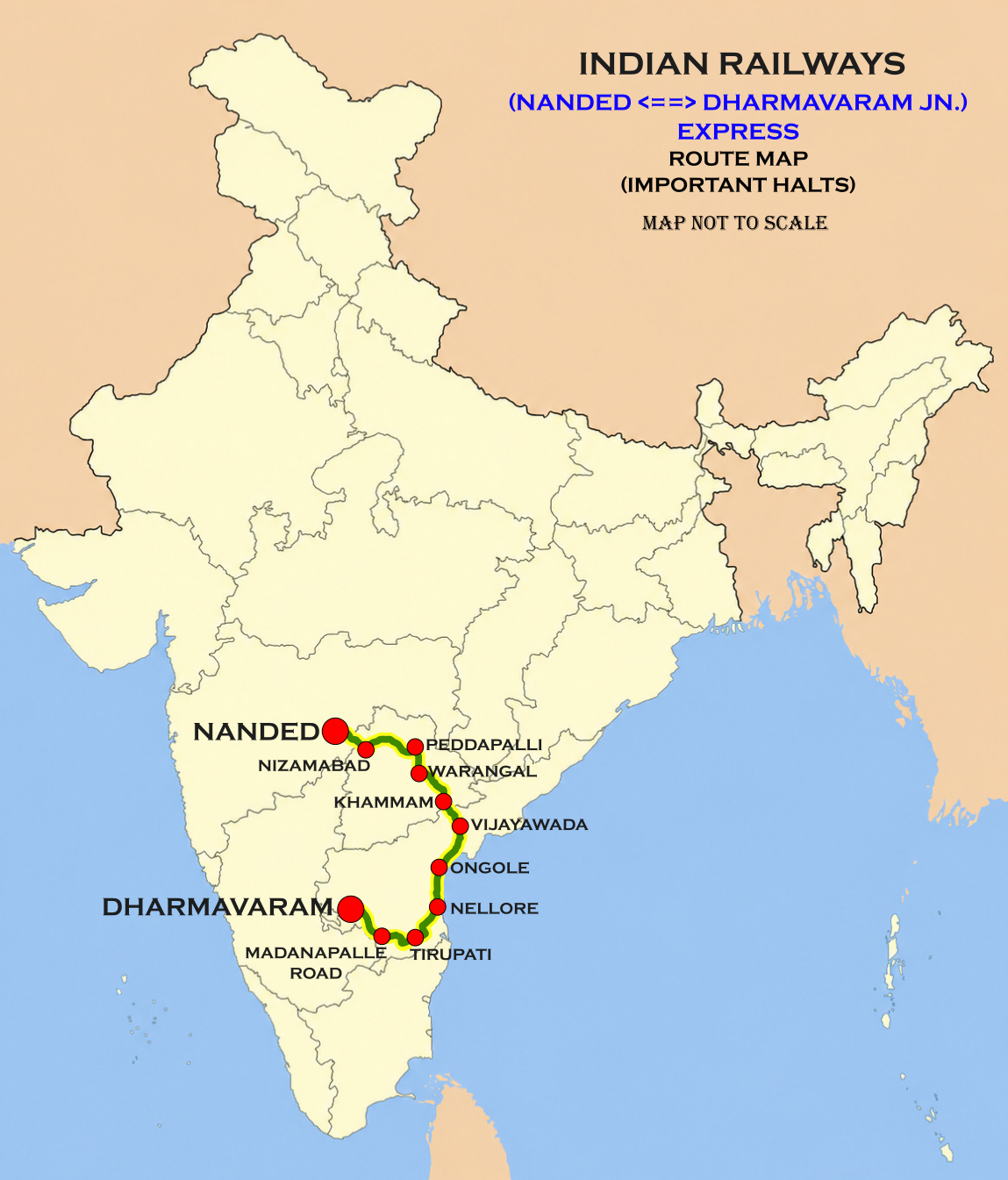
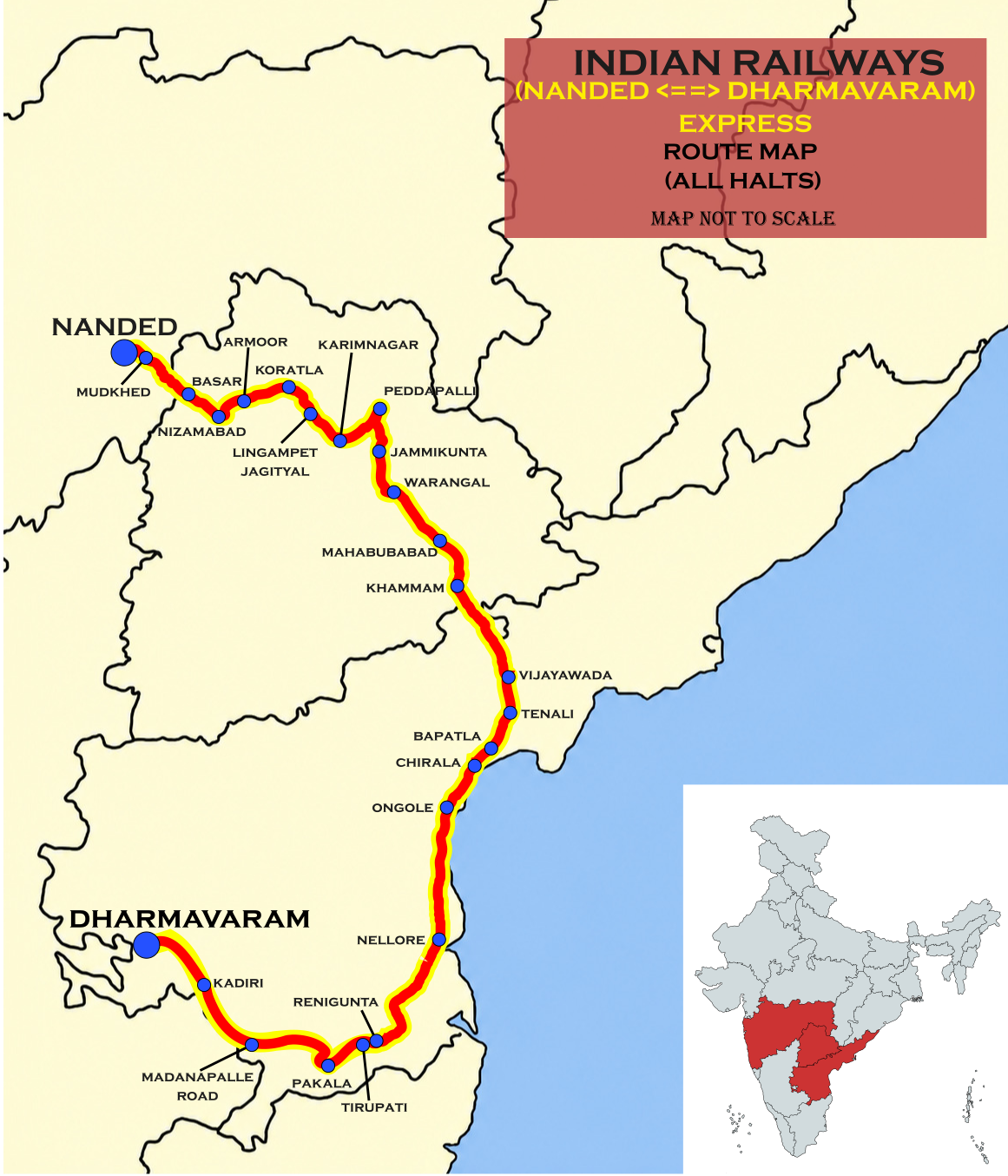
- Hazur Sahib Nanded - Dharmavaram Jn. Express Route Map (Important Halts) Hazur Sahib Nanded - Dharmavaram Jn. Express Route Map (All Halts)

The 17635 / 17636 Hazur Sahib Nanded–Dharmavaram Junction Weekly Express is an express train belonging to South Central Railway zone that runs between the city Hazur Sahib Nanded of Maharashtra and Dharmavaram Junction of Andhra Pradesh in India.

It operates as train number 17635 from Hazur Sahib Nanded to Dharmavaram Junction and as train number 17636 in the reverse direction, serving the states of Andhra Pradesh, Telangana and Maharashtra.

== Services ==
• 17635/ Hazur Sahib Nanded–Dharmavaram Junction Weekly Express has an average speed of 46 km/h and covers 1235 km in 26h 45m.

• 17636/ Dharmavaram Junction–Hazur Sahib Nanded Weekly Express has an average speed of 46 km/h and covers 1235 km in 26h 40m.

== Routes and halts ==
The Halts of the train are :

● Hazur Sahib Nanded

● Mudkhed Junction

● Basar

● Nizamabad Junction

● Armoor

● Koratla

● Lingampet Jagityal

● Karimnagar

● Peddapalli Junction

● Jammikunta

● Warangal

● Mahabubabad

● Khammam

● Vijayawada Junction

● Tenali Junction

● Bapatla

● Chirala

● Ongole

● Nellore

● Renigunta Junction

● Tirupati

● Pakala Junction

● Madanapalle Road

● Kadiri

● Dharmavaram Junction

== Schedule ==
17635 Hazur Sahib Nanded - Dharmavaram Junction Weekly Express (Every Friday)

Station Code	Station name	Arrival	Departure
NED	Hazur Sahib Nanded	---	16:45
MUE	Mudkhed Junction	17:20	17:22
BSX	Basar	18:30	18:32
NZB	Nizamabad Junction	18:58	19:00
ARMU	Armoor	19:23	19:25
KRLA	Koratla	19:58	20:00
LPJL	Lingampet-Jagityal	20:23	20:25
KRMR	Karimnagar	21:28	21:30
PDPL	Peddapalli Junction	22:00	22:20
JMKT	Jammikunta	22:49	22:50
WL	Warangal	23:48	23:50
MABD	Mahabubabad	00:38	00:40
KMT	Khammam	01:23	01:25
BZA	Vijayawada Junction	04:10	04:20
TEL	Tenali Junction	04:58	05:00
BPP	Bapatla	05:33	05:35
CLX	Chirala	05:48	05:50
OGL	Ongole	06:58	07:00
NLR	Nellore	08:33	08:35
RU	Renigunta Junction	11:00	11:20
TPTY	Tirupati	12:10	12:15
PAK	Pakala Junction	12:58	13:00
MPL	Madanapalle Road	14:23	14:25
KRY	Kadiri	15:58	16:00
DMM	Dharmavaram Junction	19:30	---

17636 Dharmavaram Junction - Hazur Sahib Nanded Weekly Express (Every Sunday)

Station Code	Station name	Arrival	Departure
DMM	Dharmavaram Junction	---	05:25
KRY	Kadiri	06:23	06:25
MPL	Madanapalle Road	07:18	07:20
PAK	Pakala Junction	08:53	08:55
TPTY	Tirupati	10:30	10:40
RU	Renigunta Junction	11:10	11:20
NLR	Nellore	13:53	13:55
OGL	Ongole	15:43	15:45
CLX	Chirala	16:23	16:25
BPP	Bapatla	16:38	16:40
TEL	Tenali Junction	17:18	17:20
BZA	Vijayawada Junction	18:35	18:45
KMT	Khammam	20:33	20:35
MABD	Mahabubabad	21:18	21:20
WL	Warangal	22:18	22:20
JMKT	Jammikunta	23:09	23:10
PDPL	Peddapalli Junction	23:55	00:15
KRMR	Karimnagar	00:38	00:40
LPJL	Lingampet-Jagityal	01:38	01:40
KRLA	Koratla	02:01	02:03
ARMU	Armoor	02:58	03:00
NZB	Nizamabad Junction	04:00	04:05
BSX	Basar	04:45	04:47
MUE	Mudkhed Junction	06:40	06:42
NED	Hazur Sahib Nanded	08:05	---

== Coach composition ==
The train has 3 AC 2-Tier, 6 AC 3-Tier, 7 Sleeper class, 4 Second class, 1 End-on Generator car and 1 Seating-cum-Luggage Rake (total of 22 LHB coach).

Loco	1	2	3	4	5	6	7	8	9	10	11	12	13	14	15	16	17	18	19	20	21	22
	SLR	GS	GS	A1	A2	B1	B2	B3	B4	B5	B6	S1	S2	S3	S4	S5	S6	S7	S8	GS	GS	EOG

== Traction ==
As the entire route is fully electrified it is hauled by a Lalaguda Loco Shed (LGD) based WAP-7 electric locomotive from Hazur Sahib Nanded to Dharmavaram Junction and vice versa.

== Rake Reversal or Rake Share ==
The train will reverse 1 time :

1. Peddapalli Junction

The train will Rake Sharing with Marathwada Sampark Kranti Express (12753/12754).

== Gallery ==
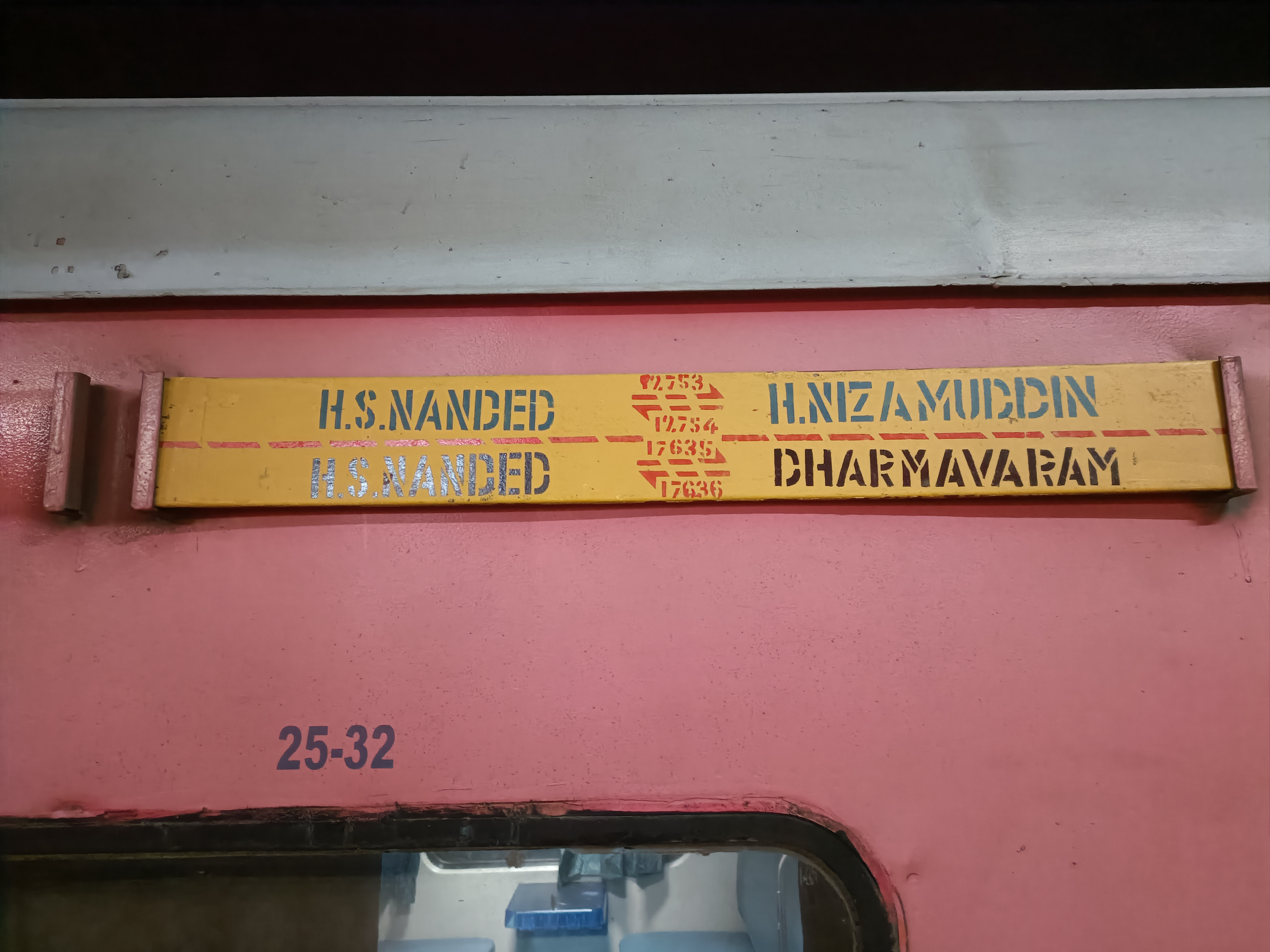
Train Name Board

== See also ==
Trains from Hazur Sahib Nanded :

1. Hazur Sahib Nanded–Tiruchanur Weekly Express
2. Hazur Sahib Nanded–Amritsar Superfast Express
3. Marathwada Sampark Kranti Express
4. KSR Bengaluru–Hazur Sahib Nanded Express
5. Hazur Sahib Nanded–Shri Ganganagar Weekly Express
6. Hazur Sahib Nanded–Jammu Tawi Humsafar Express

Trains from Dharmavaram Junction :

1. Machilipatnam–Dharmavaram Express

== Notes ==
a. Runs 1 day in a week with both directions.
