= Hyderabad–Kanniyakumari Express =

Train in India

Hyderabad - Kanniyakumari Express

Overview
- Service type: Express
- Locale: Telangana, Andhra Pradesh & Tamil Nadu
- First service: 1 April 2026; 2 months ago
- Current operator: South Central (SCR)

Route
- Termini: Hyderabad Deccan (HYB); Kanniyakumari Terminus (CAPE)
- Stops: 36
- Distance travelled: 1,582 km (983 mi)
- Average journey time: 33 hrs 45 mins
- Service frequency: Weekly
- Train number: 17069 / 17070

On-board services
- Classes: General Unreserved, Sleeper Class, AC 1 Tier, AC 2 Tier, AC 3 Tier
- Seating arrangements: Yes
- Sleeping arrangements: Yes
- Catering facilities: On-board Catering
- Observation facilities: Large windows
- Baggage facilities: No
- Other facilities: Below the seats

Technical
- Rolling stock: ICF coach
- Track gauge: 1,676 mm (5 ft 6 in)
- Operating speed: 130 km/h (81 mph) maximum, 47 km/h (29 mph) average including halts.
Route map
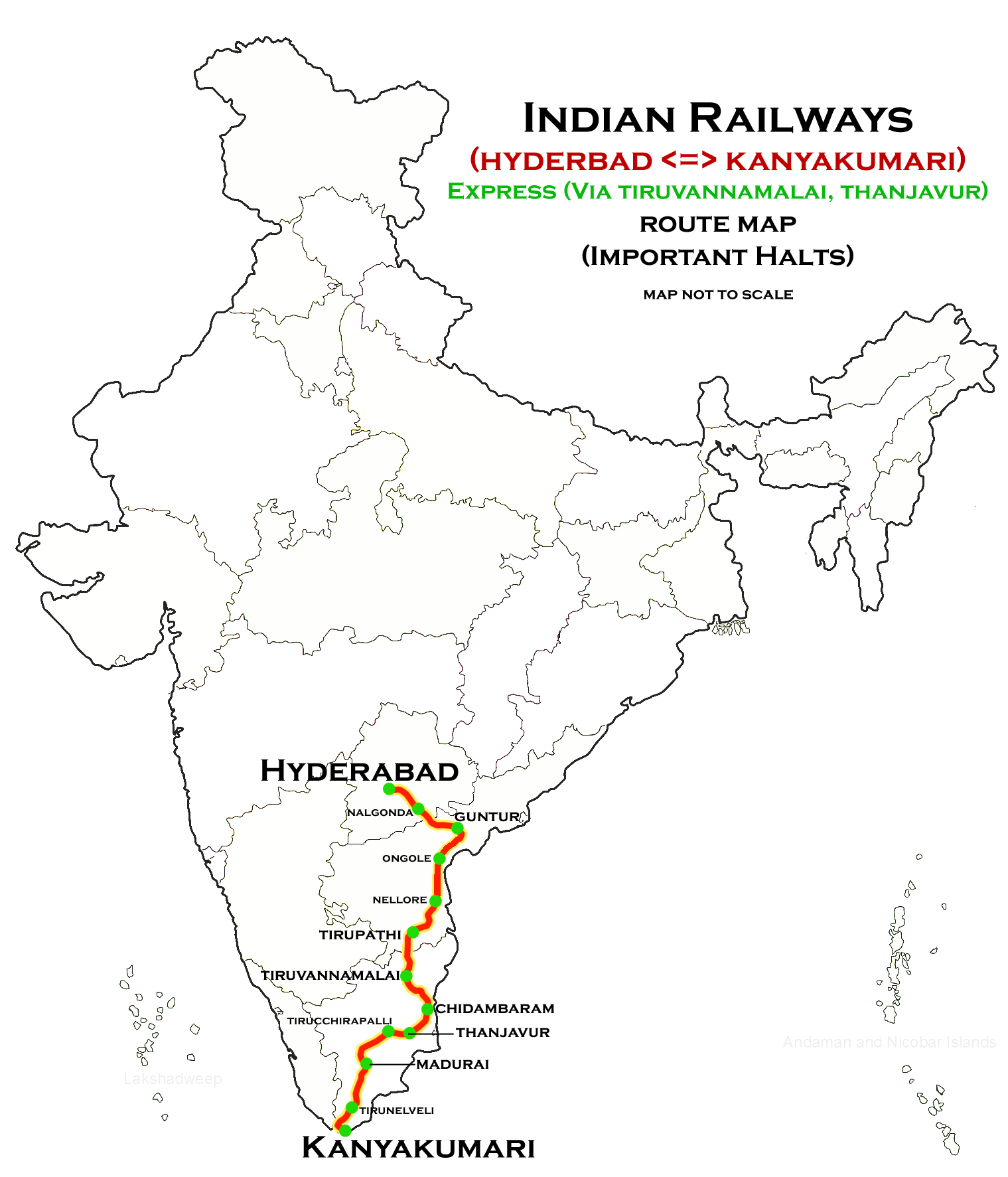

The 17069 / 17070 Hyderabad–Kanniyakumari Express is an express train belonging to South Central Railway zone that runs between the city Hyderabad Deccan of Telangana and Kanniyakumari Terminus of Tamil Nadu in India.

It operates as train number 17069 from Hyderabad Deccan to Kanniyakumari Terminus and as train number 17070 in the reverse direction, serving the states of Tamil Nadu, Andhra Pradesh and Telangana.

== Services ==
• 17069/ Hyderabad–Kanniyakumari Express has an average speed of 47 km/h and covers 1582 km in 33h 45m.

• 17070/ Kanniyakumari–Hyderabad Express has an average speed of 48 km/h and covers 1582 km in 33h 15m.

== Routes and halts ==
The Important Halts of the train are :

- Hyderabad Deccan
- Secunderabad Junction
- Charlapalli
- Nalgonda
- Miryalaguda
- Nadikudi
- Sattenapalle
- Guntur Junction
- Tenali Junction
- Chirala
- Ongole
- Nellore
- Gudur Junction
- Renigunta Junction
- Tirupati
- Pakala Junction
- Chittoor
- Katpadi Junction
- Tiruvannamalai
- Villupuram Junction
- Thirupadiripuliyur
- Chidambaram
- Mayiladuthurai Junction
- Kumbakonam
- Thanjavur Junction
- Tiruchchirappalli Junction
- Dindigul Junction
- Kodaikanal Road
- Madurai Junction
- Virudhunagar Junction
- Satur
- Kovilpatti
- Tirunelveli Junction
- Valliyur
- Nagercoil Junction
- Kanniyakumari Terminus

== Schedule ==
• 17069 - 4:45 PM (Wednesday) [Hyderabad Deccan]

• 17070 - 5:15 AM (Friday) [Kanniyakumari Terminus]

== Coach Composition ==
1. General Unreserved - 4
2. Sleeper Class - 9
3. AC 1st Class - 1
4. AC 2nd Class - 2
5. AC 3rd Class - 6

== Traction ==
As the entire route is fully electrified it is hauled by a Lallaguda Loco Shed-based WAP-7 electric locomotive from Hyderabad Deccan to Kanniyakumari Terminus and vice versa.

== Rake Reversal or rake share ==
No rake Reversal or rake share.

== See also ==
Trains from Hyderabad Deccan :

1. Hyderabad–Jaipur Meenakshi Express
2. Hyderabad–Vasco da Gama Express
3. Hisar–Hyderabad Weekly Express
4. Telangana Express
5. Hyderabad–Visakhapatnam Godavari Express

Trains from Kanniyakumari Terminus :

1. Puducherry–Kanniyakumari Weekly Express
2. Kanyakumari–Pune Express
3. Dibrugarh–Kanniyakumari Vivek Express
4. Chennai Egmore–Kanniyakumari Express
5. Parasuram Express

== Notes ==
a. Runs a day in a week with both directions.
