= Pakala Junction railway station =

Railway Station in Andhra Pradesh

Coordinates: 13.4509°N 79.1146°E

Pakala Junction
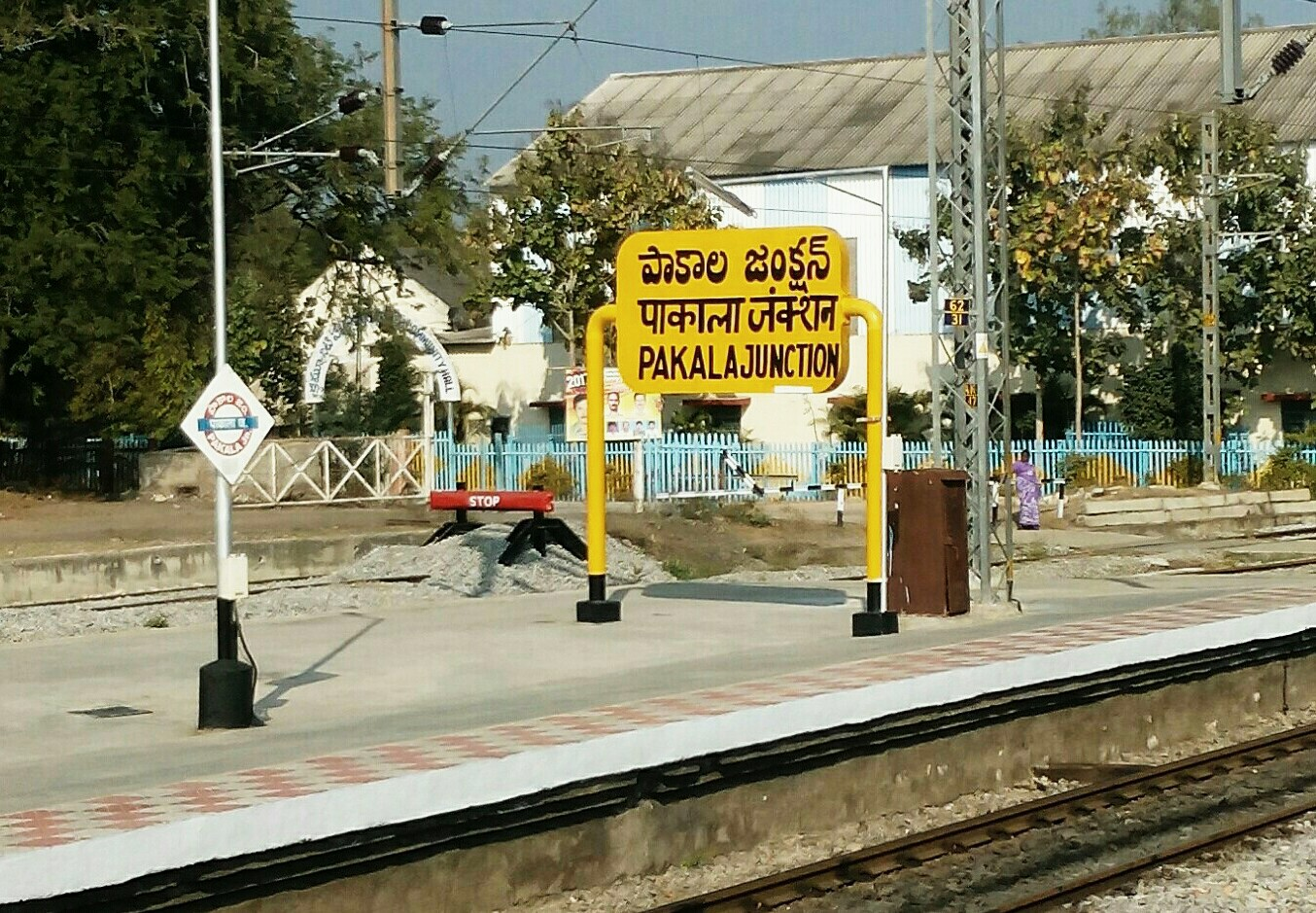
- Pakala Junction railway station board

General information
- Location: Pakala, Andhra Pradesh; India
- Elevation: 371 m (1,217 ft)
- System: Indian Railways station
- Owner: Indian Railways
- Lines: Gudur–Katpadi branch line, Dharmavarm–Pakala branch line

Construction
- Parking: available

Other information
- Status: Functional
- Station code: PAK
- Fare zone: South Coast Railway zone
Location
- Location within Andhra Pradesh Location within India

Pakala Junction railway station (station code: PAK) is a railway station serving Pakala, Tirupati district, Andhra Pradesh, 517112, India.

== Administration ==
The station comes under the jurisdiction of Guntakal railway division of South Coast Railways.

== Infrastructure ==
The station has three platforms.This station is selected in Amrit Bharat Scheme which is being under redevelopment

== Routes ==
This station is a junction railway station has three lines from here towards Dharmavaram Junction, Katpadi Junction, Renigunta Junction.

== Connectivity ==
More than 50 trains halts in this station. It is well connected to major Indian cities such as Tirupati, Hyderabad,Vijayawada,Visakhapatnam,Rajahmundry, Kurnool,Bengaluru,Tiruchy,Madurai, Coimbatore, Mysuru,Pune,Solapur,Mumbai, Kanniyakumari, Thiruvananthapuram, Ernakulam,Ranchi etc.

== Halting Trains ==
- 11313 - Solapur - Anakapalle Express
- 11314 - Anakapalle - Solapur Express
- 12731 - Tirupati-Secundrabad-Padmavathi SF Express Via Guntakal
- 12732 - Secunderabad-Tirupati-Padmavathi SF Express via Guntakal
- 12765 – Tirupati–Amravati Express
- 12766 – Amravati–Tirupati SF Express
- 12769 - Tirupati-Secunderabad-Seven hills SF Express
- 12770 - Secunderabad-Tirupati-Seven hills SF Express
- 12797 – Kacheguda–Chittoor-Venkatadri SF Express
- 12798 – Chittoor–Kacheguda-Venkatadri SF Express
- 16219 - Chamarajanagar-Tirupati Express
- 16220 - Tirupati-Chamarajanagar Express
- 16339 – Mumbai–Nagercoil Express
- 16340 – Nagercoil–Mumbai LTT Express
- 16381 – Pune–Kanyakumari-Jayanthi Janata Express
- 16382 – Kanyakumari–Pune-Jayanthi Janata Express
- 16779 – Tirupati–Rameswaram Meenakshi Express
- 16780 – Rameswaram–Tirupathi Meenakshi Express
- 16853 – Tirupati – Villupuram Intercity Express
- 16854 – Villupuram – Tirupati Intercity Express
- 16870 - Villupuram - Tirupati Memu Express
- 17069 - Hyderabad-Kanniyakumari Express
- 17070 - Kanniyakumari-Hyderabad Express
- 17209 – SMVT Bengaluru-Kakinada Town-Seshadri Express
- 17210 – Kakinada Town-SMVT Bengaluru-Seshadri Express
- 17247 – Narsapur – Dharmavaram Express
- 17248 – Dharmavaram – Narsapur Express
- 17261 - Guntur - Tiruchchirapalli Express
- 17262 - Tiruchchirapalli - Guntur Express
- 17407 – Tirupati–Mannargudi-Pamani Express
- 17408 – Mannargudi–Tirupati-Pamani Express
- 17423 - Tirupati–Chikkmagaluru Weekly Express
- 17424- Chikkmagaluru-Tirupati Weekly Express
- 17429 - Tirupati-Akola Express
- 17430 - Akola- Tirupati Express
- 17615 – Kacheguda–Tuticorin Express
- 17616 – Tuticorin–Kacheguda Express
- 17635 - Hazur Sahib Nanded–Dharmavaram Junction Weekly Express
- 17636 - Dharmavaram - Hazur Sahib Nanded Express
- 18637 – Hatia–SMVT Bengaluru Weekly Express
- 18638 – SMVT Bengaluru–Hatia Weekly Express
- 22615 - Tirupati–Coimbatore Intercity Express
- 22616 – Coimbatore–Tirupati Intercity SF Express
- 22617 – Tirupati–SMVT Bengaluru Intercity SF Express
- 22618 – SMVT Bengaluru–Tirupati Intercity Express
- 22715 – Kacheguda–Madurai Weekly Express
- 22716 – Madurai – Kacheguda Weekly SF Express
- 57403 – Tirupati – Guntakal
- 57404 – Guntakal – Tirupati
- 57405 – Tirupati – Kadiridevarapalli
- 57406 – Kadiridevarapalli – Tirupati
- 66028 - Tirupati - Katpadi
- 67205 - Tirupati - Katpadi
- 67206 - Katpadi - Tirupati
- 67207 - Tirupati - Katpadi
- 67208 - Katpadi - Tirupati
- 67209 - Tirupati - Katpadi
- 67210 - Katpadi - Tirupati
- 07001 - Charlapalli - Tiruvannamalai Special
- 07002 - Tiruvannamalai - Charlapalli Special

== Line and location ==
This station is situated in Gudur–Katpadi branch line with a branch line connecting to Dharmavaram.
