= Seshadri Express =

Train in India

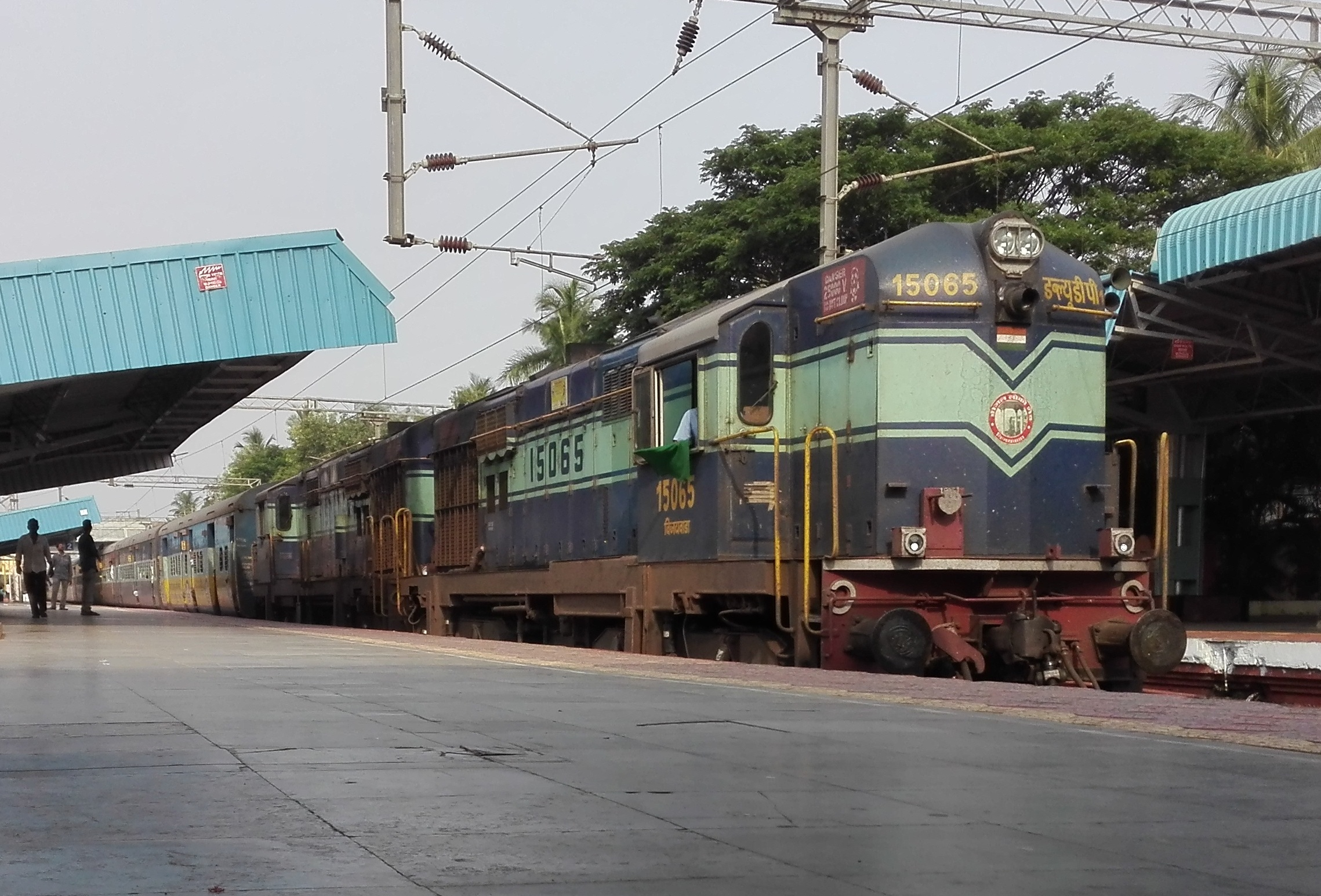
- Seshadri Express pulled by WDP-1A at Samarlakota Junction

Overview
- Service type: Express
- Status: Operating
- Locale: Andhra Pradesh, Tamil Nadu & Karnataka
- First service: 24 December 2002; 23 years ago (initial service between Kakinada Town and Tirupati); 2005; 21 years ago (extended to KSR Bengaluru); 2 October 2022; 3 years ago (change of terminus from KSR Bengaluru to SMVT Bengaluru)
- Current operator: South Coast Railway zone

Route
- Termini: Kakinada Town (CCT); SMVT Bengaluru (SVMB)
- Stops: 35
- Distance travelled: 959 km (596 mi)
- Average journey time: 18 hours 45 minutes
- Service frequency: Daily
- Train number: 17209 / 17210

On-board services
- Seating arrangements: Yes
- Sleeping arrangements: Yes
- Observation facilities: LHB coach (from January 2026)

Technical
- Rolling stock: 4
- Track gauge: 1,676 mm (5 ft 6 in)
- Operating speed: 50 km/h (31 mph)
- Rake sharing: 17235/17236 SMVT Bengaluru–Nagercoil Express
Route map
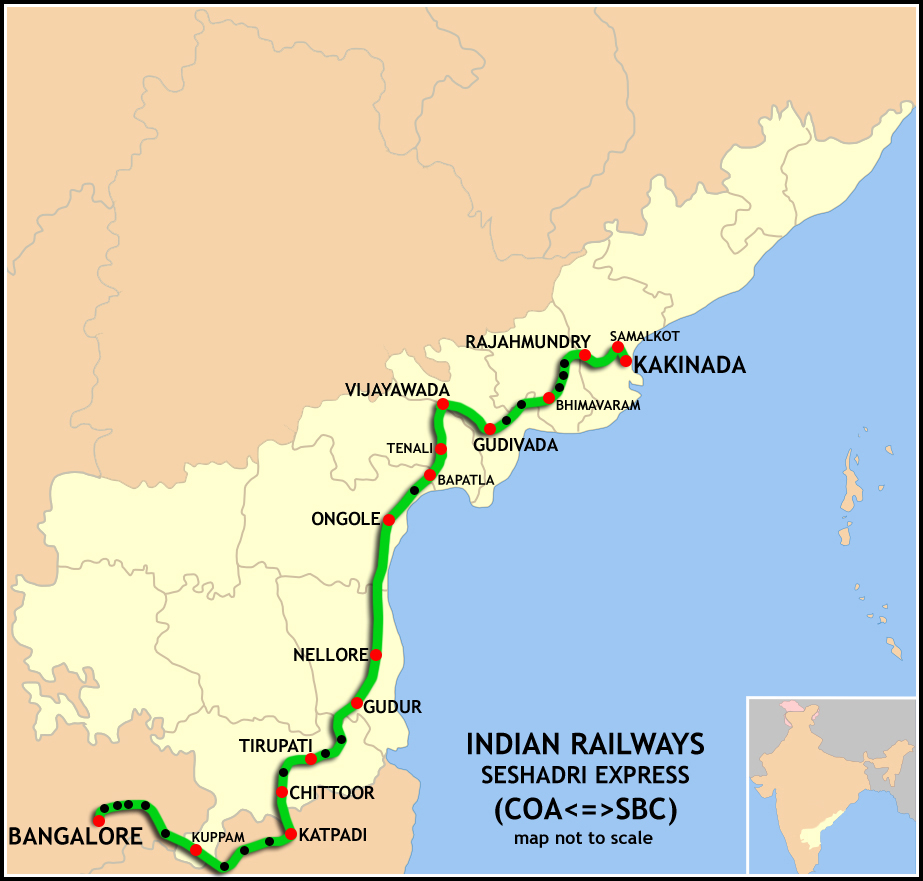

The Seshadri Express is a train in India, named after the Seshadri Hills of Tirupati. The train's inaugural run was between Andhra Pradesh's coastal city of Kakinada to temple pilgrimage city of Tirupati. In 2005, it was extended to Bengaluru in neighboring Karnataka. From 2 October 2022 its terminal has changed to Sir M. Visvesvaraya Terminal. Seshadri Express is more often or not late

== History ==
It was started in 2002. Prior to the Seshadri Express, a link express from Kakinada, which consisted of twelve compartments, was connected to the Tirumala Express which runs from Visakhapatnam to Tirupati and Samalkot Junction, these two trains were coupled and run together till Tirupati Main. Keeping in mind the growing demand for a new train to the pilgrim centre, the government introduced the Seshadri Express in 2002 and extended it up to Bengaluru. The train thus runs through the loop path of Nidadavolu, Tanuku, Bhimavaram, Gudivada, and Vijayawada to cater to the needs of the Godavari and Krishna district.

== Coach composition ==
The Seshadri Express runs between Kakinada and Bengaluru, the IT capital of India, Bangalore, via Tirupati. It is currently being operated with 17209 / 17210 train numbers. It is one of the busiest trains, running with 23 coaches at full capacity at all times. It has eight AC, eleven sleeper, two second-class general compartments, and two luggage cum brake vans. Seshadri express and Nagercoil to SMVT Bengaluru trains have been upgraded to LHB coaches from January 2026. The most likely coach composition is four unreserved coaches, six 3AC coaches, three 2AC coaches and one 1AC coach and eight sleeper coaches and two car generators (24 LHB coaches) along with end to end WAP-7 or WAP-4 electric locomotive.

earlier this train runs with ICF coach and was pulled by WDP-1 or Krishaveni WAG-5A, since 2018 ICF Utkrisht was introduced this train get an upgrade and it was hauled by WAP-4 and in 2026 they gets an LHB coach upgrade and it was hauled end to end by WAP-7 or WAP-4

== Route ==
- Kakinada Town
- Samarlakota Junction
- Anaparthi
- Rajamahendravaram
- Nidadavolu Junction
- Tanuku
- Bhimavaram Town Halt
- Akividu
- Kaikaluru
- Gudivada Junction
- Vijayawada Junction
- Tenali Junction
- Bapatla
- Chirala
- Ongole
- Singarayakonda
- Kavali
- Nellore
- Gudur Junction
- Srikalahasti
- Renigunta Junction
- Tirupati
- Pakala Junction
- Chittoor
- Katpadi Junction
- Gudiyattam
- Vaniyambadi
- Jolarpettai Junction
- Kuppam
- Bangarapete Junction
- Tyakal
- Maluru
- Whitefield
- Krishnarajapura
- Sir M. Visvesvaraya Terminal, Bengaluru

== Timetable ==
The Seshadri Express operates daily in both directions as a direct service connecting Karnataka, Tamil Nadu, and Andhra Pradesh.

- Down Train (17209): Departs SMVT Bengaluru daily at 11:30 and terminates at Kakinada Town at 06:30 the following morning.
- Up Train (17210): Departs Kakinada Town daily at 17:25 and terminates at SMVT Bengaluru at 12:25 the following afternoon.

17209 (SMVB to CCT)		Station name	Station code	17210 (CCT to SMVB)	
Arrival	Departure	Station name	Station code	Arrival	Departure
—	11:30	SMVT Bengaluru	SMVB	12:25	—
11:43	11:44	Krishnarajapuram	KJM	11:09	11:10
11:53	11:54	Whitefield	WFD	10:57	10:58
12:09	12:10	Malur	MLO	10:40	10:41
12:20	12:21	Tyakal	TCL	10:29	10:30
12:31	12:32	Bangarapet Junction	BWT	10:18	10:19
13:00	13:01	Kuppam	KPN	09:50	09:51
14:03	14:05	Jolarpettai Junction	JTJ	09:08	09:10
14:23	14:25	Vaniyambadi	VN	08:33	08:35
14:53	14:55	Gudiyattam	GYM	08:03	08:05
15:25	15:30	Katpadi Junction	KPD	07:35	07:40
15:58	16:00	Chittoor	CTO	06:38	06:40
16:23	16:25	Pakala Junction	PAK	06:13	06:15
17:10	17:15	Tirupati Main	TPTY	05:15	05:20
17:40	17:50	Renigunta Junction	RU	04:35	04:45
18:14	18:15	Sri Kalahasti	KHT	04:09	04:10
19:13	19:15	Gudur Junction	GDR	03:13	03:15
19:58	20:00	Nellore	NLR	02:29	02:30
20:49	20:50	Kavali	KVZ	01:44	01:45
21:18	21:20	Singarayakonda	SKM	01:14	01:15
21:48	21:50	Ongole	OGL	00:54	00:55
22:33	22:35	Chirala	CLX	00:09	00:10
22:49	22:50	Bapatla	BPP	23:49	23:50
23:28	23:30	Tenali Junction	TEL	23:08	23:10
00:25	00:35	Vijayawada Junction	BZA	22:35	22:45
01:14	01:15	Gudivada Junction	GDV	21:18	21:20
01:43	01:45	Kaikaluru	KKLR	20:44	20:45
02:03	02:05	Akividu	AKVD	20:18	20:20
02:23	02:25	Bhimavaram Town	BVRT	19:59	20:00
02:49	02:50	Tanuku	TNKU	19:14	19:15
03:29	03:30	Nidadavolu Junction	NDD	18:49	18:50
04:28	04:30	Rajahmundry	RJY	18:18	18:20
04:54	04:55	Anaparti	APT	17:53	17:55
05:28	05:30	Samalkot Junction	SLO	17:38	17:40
06:30	—	Kakinada Town	CCT	—	17:25

This train acts as a night express between Godavari district places and the pilgrimage centre of Tirupati, and also as an Intercity express between Tirupati and Bangalore.

== Gallery ==
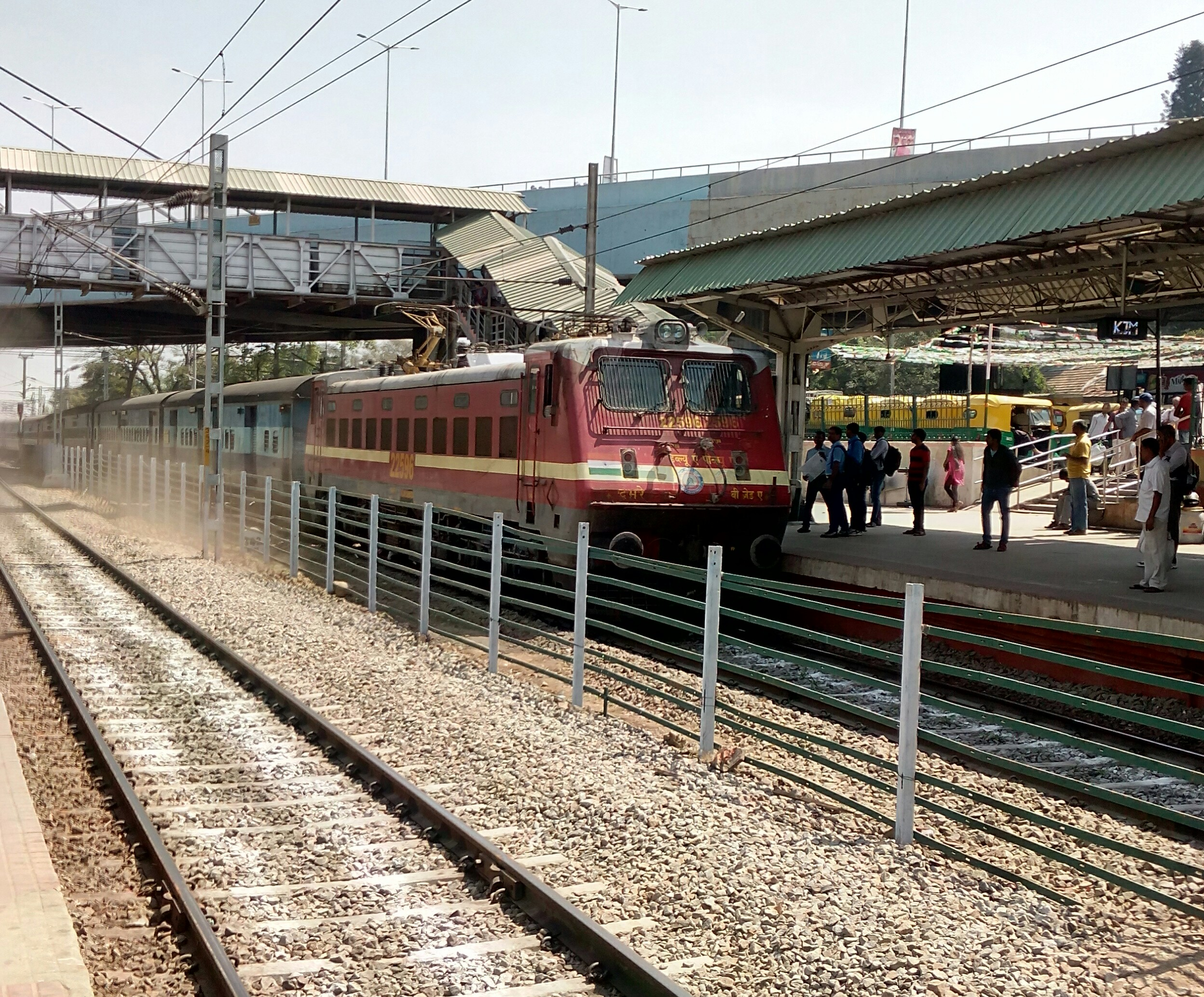
Sesadri Express near KR Puram

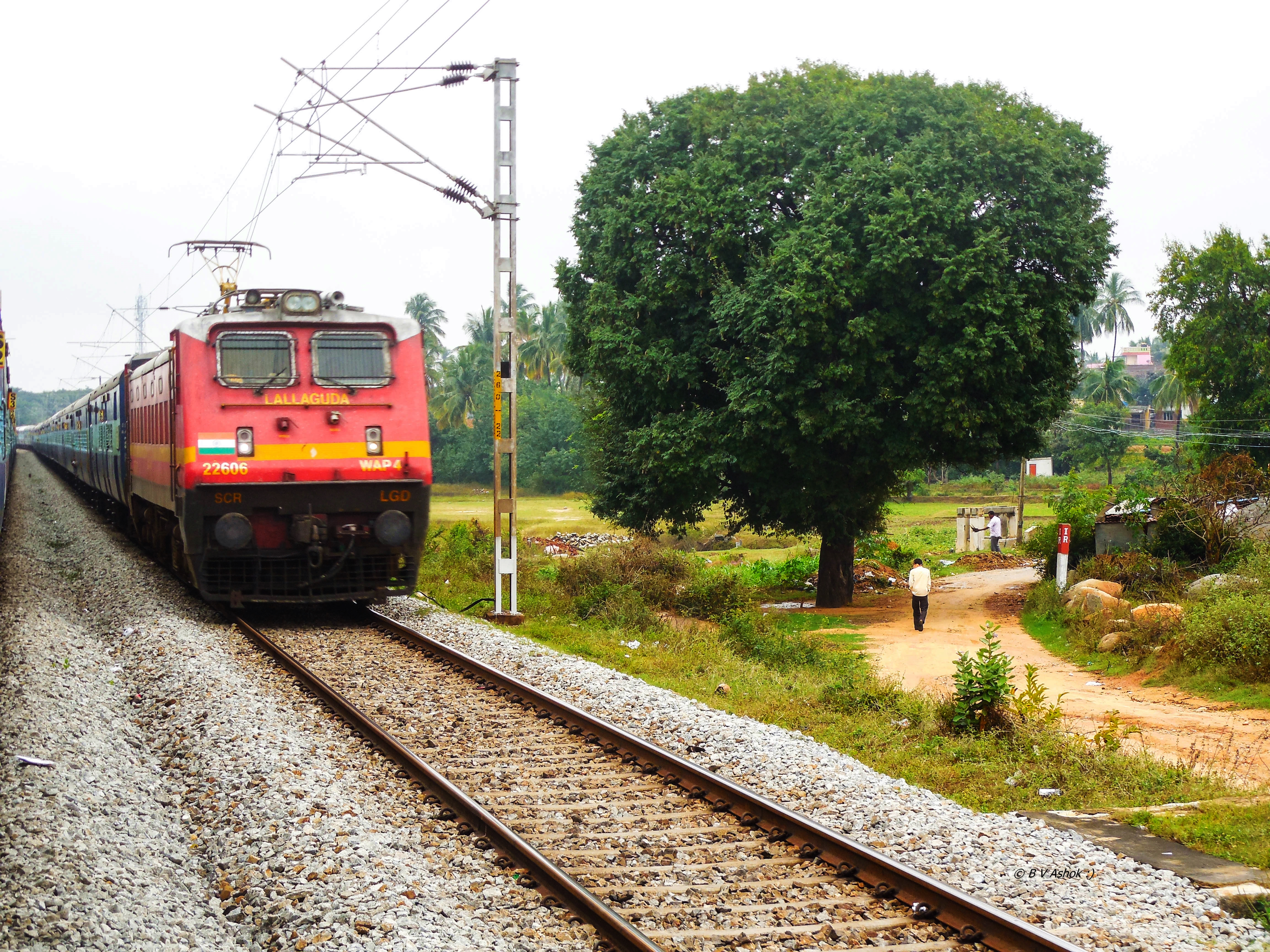
Seshadri Express
