= Tirupati West Halt railway station =

Railway station in Andhra Pradesh, India

Tirupati West Halt

General information
- Location: Tirupati, Andhra Pradesh; India
- Coordinates: 13°37′40″N 79°25′10″E
- Elevation: 160 m (525 ft)
- System: Indian Railways station
- Lines: Renigunta–Katpadi line, West North Line, Chennai Suburban
- Platforms: 1
- Tracks: 5 ft 6 in (1,676 mm) broad gauge

Construction
- Structure type: Standard (on-ground station)

Other information
- Status: Functioning
- Station code: TPW
- Zone(s): South Coast Railway zone
- Division(s): Guntakal

Services
Preceding station	Indian Railways	Following station
Tirupati Main towards ?	South Central Railway zone Renigunta–Katpadi line	Chandragiri towards ?
Location
- Location within Andhra Pradesh Location within India

Tirupati West Halt railway station (station code: TPW) is located at Tirupati of Tirupati district of the Indian state of Andhra Pradesh. It serves as the second station besides Tirupati main station under Guntakal railway division of South Coast Railway zone. It is a broad gauge electrified line.

== See also ==
- Tiruchanur railway station
- Renigunta Junction railway station
