= SMVT Bangalore–Tirupati Intercity Express =

Train in India

SMVT Bengaluru-Tirupati Intercity Superfast Express
Overview
- Service type: Superfast
- Locale: Andhra Pradesh, Tamil Nadu & Karnataka
- Current operator: Southern Railway

Route
- Termini: Tirupati (TPTY); SMVT Bengaluru (SMVB)
- Stops: 9
- Distance travelled: 334 km (208 mi)
- Average journey time: 6 hours
- Service frequency: Tri Weekly
- Train number: 22617 / 22618

On-board services
- Classes: General Unreserved, AC Chair Car, Chair car
- Seating arrangements: Yes
- Sleeping arrangements: No
- Catering facilities: E-catering
- Observation facilities: Large windows
- Baggage facilities: No
- Other facilities: Below the seats

Technical
- Rolling stock: LHB coach
- Track gauge: Broad Gauge
- Operating speed: 54 km/h (34 mph) average including halts.

The 22617 / 22618 SMVT Bengaluru-Tirupati Intercity Superfast Express is an superfast train belonging to Indian Railways Southern Railway zone that runs between Sir M. Visvesvaraya Terminal, Bengaluru and Tirupati in India.

It operates as train number 22617 from Tirupati to Sir M. Visvesvaraya Terminal, Bengaluru and as train number 22618 in the reverse direction serving the states of Karnataka, Tamil Nadu & Andhra Pradesh. It used to operate from KSR Bengaluru till 1 October 2022 before being shifted to SMVT Bengaluru on 2 October 2022.

== Coaches ==
The 22617 / 18 SMVT Bengaluru - Tirupati Intercity Express has two AC chair car, 9 Chair car, 8 general unreserved, 1 SLR (seating with luggage rake) and EOG . It does not carry a pantry car coach.

As is customary with most train services in India, coach composition may be amended at the discretion of Indian Railways depending on demand.

== Service ==
The 22617 Tirupati–SMVT Bengaluru Tri-weekly Express covers the distance of 334 km (208 mi) in 6 hours 00 mins (56 km/h) and in 5 hours 50 mins as the 22618 SMVT Bengaluru–Tirupati Tri-weekly Express (57 km/h).

As the average speed of the train is lower than 55 km/h (34 mph), as per railway rules, its fare doesn't includes a Superfast surcharge. This train has a rake sharing with 22615/16 Tirupati–Coimbatore Intercity Express.

== Routing ==
The 22617 / 18 SMVT Bengaluru - Tirupati Intercity Express runs from Sir M. Visvesvaraya Terminal, Bengaluru via Bangarapet Junction, Jolarpettai Junction,Katpadi Junction,Pakala Junction to Tirupati.
