= Tirupati–Secunderabad Superfast Express =

Train in India

Overview
- Service type: Superfast
- First service: 26 January 2011; 15 years ago
- Current operator: South Coast Railway

Route
- Termini: Tirupati (TPTY); Secunderabad (SC)
- Stops: 14
- Distance travelled: 800 km (497 mi)
- Average journey time: 14 hours 28 minutes
- Service frequency: Bi-weekly
- Train number: 12731 / 12732

On-board services
- Classes: AC First Class, AC 2 Tier, AC 3 Tier, Sleeper Class, General Unreserved
- Seating arrangements: Yes
- Sleeping arrangements: Yes
- Catering facilities: On-board catering, E-catering
- Observation facilities: Large windows
- Baggage facilities: No
- Other facilities: Below the seats

Technical
- Rolling stock: LHB coach
- Track gauge: 1,676 mm (5 ft 6 in)
- Operating speed: 56 km/h (35 mph) average including halts.
Route map
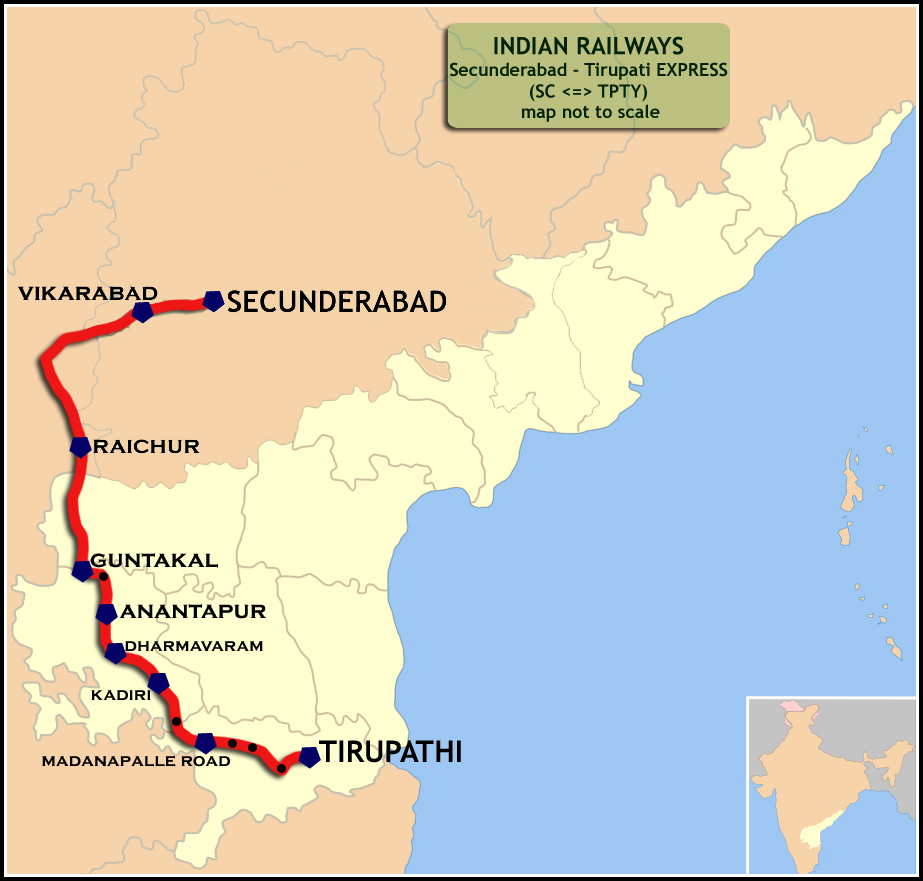

The 12731 / 12732Tirupati Secunderabad Superfast Express is a superfast train belonging to South Coast Railway zone of Indian Railways that run between Tirupati and Secunderabad Junction in India.

== Background ==
This train was inaugurated on 26 January 2011 from Secunderabad Junction, flagged off by Mamata Banerjee former minister of Railways, and was also included on 2010 rail budget.

== Service ==
The frequency of this train is bi-weekly and covers the distance of 800 km (500 mi) with an average speed of 56 km/h (35 mph) with a total time of 12 hours.

== Routes ==
This train passes through Pakala Junction, Dharmavaram Junction, Gooty Junction, Guntakal Junction, Raichur on both sides.

== Traction ==
Previously as the route is partially electrified a WDM-3A loco of pulls the train up to Dharmavaram Junction and later WAP-7 loco pulls the train to its destination on both sides but now end to end electrified a WAP-7 loco pulls the train to its destination on both sides

== Rake Share ==
12763/12764 Tirupati - Secundarabad - Tirupati Padmavathi SF Express via Vijayawada,Warangal
