= Kanyakumari–Pune Express =

Train in India

Kanyakumari-Pune Junction Jayanthi Janata Express
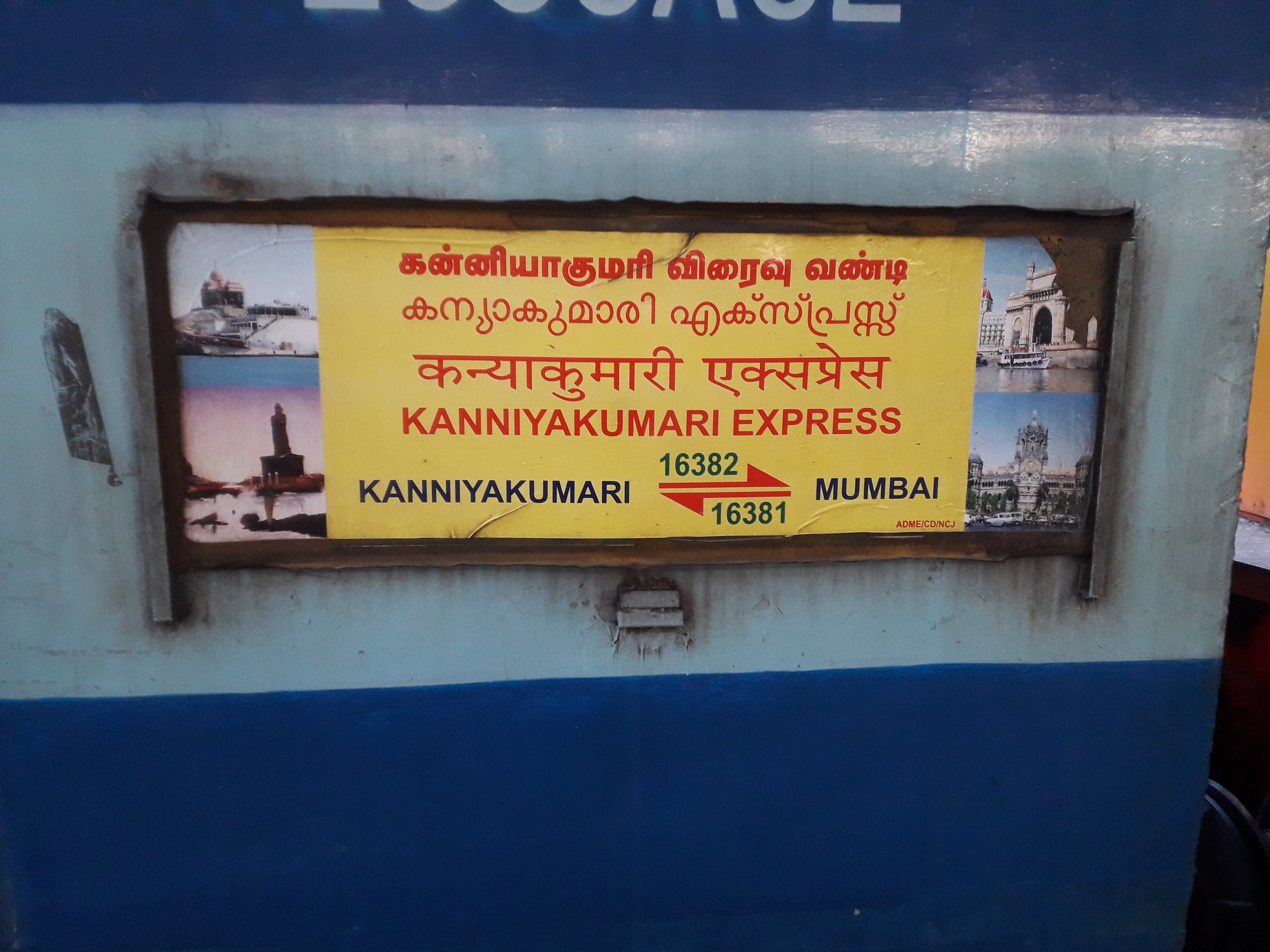
- Kanyakumari - Pune Junction Jayanthi Janatha Express

Overview
- Service type: Express
- Status: Operating under a different schedule
- Locale: Maharashtra, Karnataka, Andhra Pradesh, Tamil Nadu & Kerala
- First service: 26 January 1973; 53 years ago
- Last service: 2020( Then Replaced with Kanyakumari - Pune express)
- Current operator: Southern Railway
- Ridership: Southern railway, Thiruvananthapuram Division

Route
- Termini: Kanniyakumari (CAPE); Pune Junction (PUNE)
- Stops: 61
- Distance travelled: 2,135 km (1,327 mi)
- Average journey time: 44 hours (approx.)
- Service frequency: Daily
- Train number: 16381 / 16382

On-board services
- Classes: AC 2 Tier, AC 3 Tier, Sleeper Class, General Unreserved, AC 3 Tier Economy (3E)
- Seating arrangements: Yes
- Sleeping arrangements: Yes
- Auto-rack arrangements: Yes
- Catering facilities: Available
- Observation facilities: Large windows
- Entertainment facilities: No
- Baggage facilities: No
- Other facilities: Below the seats

Technical
- Rolling stock: LHB coach
- Track gauge: 1,676 mm (5 ft 6 in)
- Operating speed: 54 km/h (34 mph) average including halts.
Route map
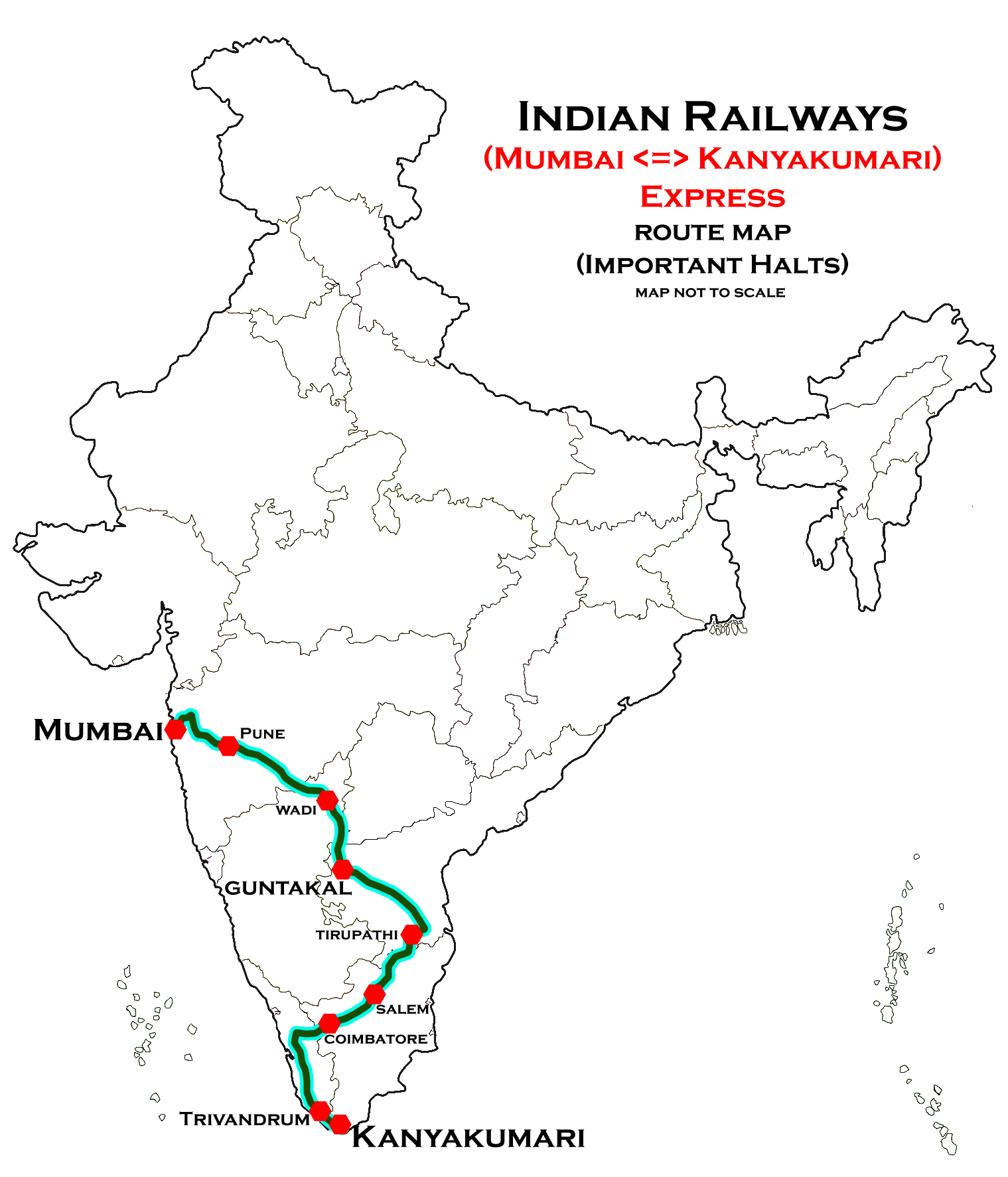

The 16381 / 16382 Kanniyakumari-Pune Express or Jayanti Janata Express is an Express train belonging to Indian Railways that runs between Kanyakumari and Pune Junction, Pune in India. It was the first and oldest train service from Mumbai to South India. Initially the service was from Victoria Terminus, Bombay (modern day Mumbai CST) to Cochin Harbour Terminus, later it was extended to Trivandrum, 81/82 Bombay- Cochin Jayanti Janata Express has been extended up to Trivandrum with effect from 1-4-1978. Then to Nagercoil then to Kanyakumari.

From 2020 onwards, according to zero-based timetable, it runs only till Pune. The train made its first run to Pune on 31 March 2022, after services were halted during the pandemic. The train ran with the Linke Hoffman Busch (LHB) coaches instead of those built by the Integral Coach Factory.

It operates as train number 16382 from Kanyakumari to Pune Junction and as train number 16381 in the reverse direction.

== Traction ==
As the entire route is fully electrified, the train is hauled by a Kalyan Loco Shed / Erode Loco Shed based WAP-7 electric locomotive on its entire journey.

== Service ==
The 16382 Kanyakumari -Pune Express covers the distance of 1941 kilometres in 37 hours 00 mins (52 km/h) and in 36 hours 10 mins (54 km/h) as 16381 PUNE- Kanyakumari Express.

== Routing ==
The service runs from Kanyakumari via Nagercoil Junction, Thiruvananthapuram Central, Kollam Junction, Kayamkulam Junction, Tiruvalla, Kottayam, Ernakulam Town, Thrissur, Palakkad Junction, Coimbatore Junction, Erode Junction, Salem Junction, Jolarpettai Junction, Katpadi Junction, Pakala Junction, Tirupati, Renigunta Junction, Yerraguntla Junction, Gooty Junction, Guntakal Junction, Raichur Junction, Wadi Junction, Kalaburagi Junction, Kurduvadi Junction, Daund Junction, Pune Junction.

On the journey to Kanyakumari, the train will have additional stops at Chalakudy, Irinjalakuda, Wadakkanchery and Ottapalam. The trains will not stop in these stations on the return journey. On the return journey to Pune, the train will have additional stops at Tripunithura and Thiruvananthapuram Pettah.
