= Hatia–SMVT Bengaluru Weekly Express =

Train in India

Hatia – SMVT Bengaluru Weekly Express

Overview
- Service type: Express
- First service: 15 February 2014; 12 years ago
- Current operator: South Eastern Railways

Route
- Termini: Hatia (HTE); Sir M. Visvesvaraya Terminal, Bengaluru (SMVB)
- Stops: 25
- Distance travelled: 1,885 km (1,171 mi)
- Average journey time: 32h 50m
- Service frequency: Weekly (Note: Runs one day in a week for every direction.)
- Train number: 18637/18638

On-board services
- Classes: AC 2 tier, AC 3 tier, Sleeper class, General Unreserved
- Seating arrangements: No
- Sleeping arrangements: Yes
- Catering facilities: On-board catering E-catering
- Observation facilities: LHB coach
- Entertainment facilities: No
- Baggage facilities: No
- Other facilities: Below the seats

Technical
- Rolling stock: 2
- Track gauge: 1,676 mm (5 ft 6 in)
- Operating speed: 57 km/h (35 mph), including halts
Route map
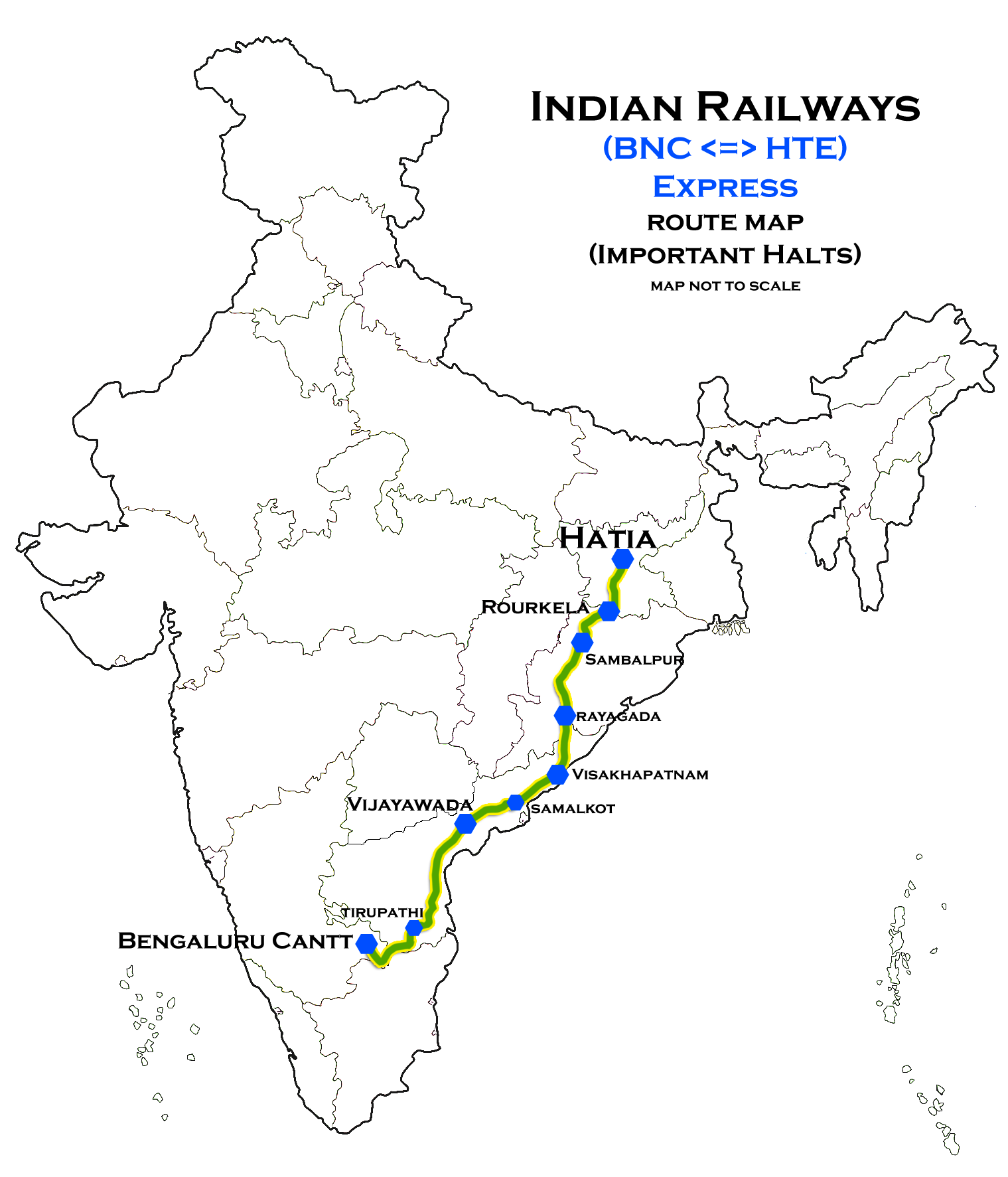

The Hatia–SMVT Bengaluru Weekly Express is an express train belonging to South Eastern Railway zone, that runs between Hatia and Sir M. Visvesvaraya Terminal in India. It is currently being operated with 18637/18638 train numbers on a weekly basis.

== Service ==
The 18637/Hatia–SMVT Bengaluru Express has an average speed of 55 km/h and covers 1890 km in 34h 15m. The 18638/SMVT Bengaluru–Hatia Express has an average speed of 51 km/h and covers 1890 km in 36h 45m.

== Route and halts ==
The important halts of the train are:

- Hatia
- Rourkela Junction
- Jharsuguda Junction
- Sambalpur Junction
- Titlagarh Junction
- Rayagada
- Vizianagaram Junction
- Visakhapatnam Junction
- Vijayawada Junction
- Renigunta Junction
- Tirupati
- Krishnarajapuram
- Sir M. Visvesvaraya Terminal, Bengaluru

== Coach composition ==
The train has standard LHB rakes with max speed of 160 km/h. The train consists of 16 coaches:

- 1 AC II Tier
- 4 AC III Tier
- 6 Sleeper coaches
- 3 General Unreserved
- 2 End-on Generator

== Traction ==
Both trains are hauled by an Erode Loco Shed-based WAP-4 electric locomotive from Bangalore Cantonment to Visakhapatnam. From Visakhapatnam, trains are hauled by a Bokaro Steel City Loco Shed-based WDM-3A diesel locomotive up til Hatia.

== Direction reversal ==
The train reverses its direction 1 times:

- Visakhapatnam Junction

== See also ==
- Bangalore Cantonment railway station
- Hatia railway station
