= Gudur–Katpadi section =

Railway line in India

Gudur–Katpadi branch line
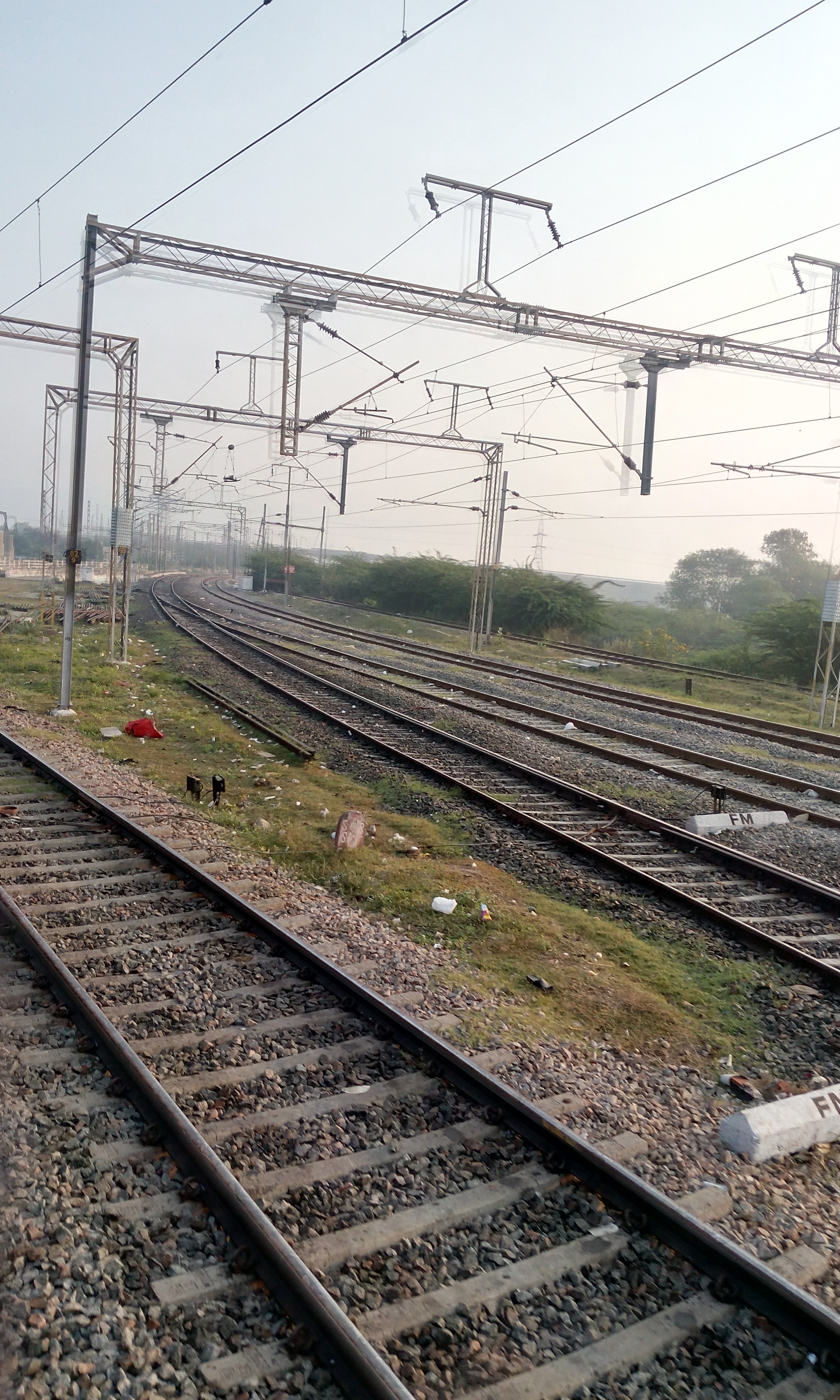
- Track diversion towards Gudur Junction at Renigunta Junction

Overview
- Status: Operational
- Owner: Indian Railways
- Locale: Andhra Pradesh, Tamil Nadu
- Termini: Gudur Junction; Katpadi Junction

Service
- Operator: South Coast Railway zone

Technical
- Line length: 198 km (123 mi)
- Number of tracks: 2/1
- Track gauge: 5 ft 6 in (1,676 mm) broad gauge
- Electrification: Yes

Gudur–Katpadi branch line connects Gudur of Andhra Pradesh town with Katpadi of Tamil Nadu City. This entire line is under the jurisdiction of Guntakal railway division. It is an electrified railway section

== Importance ==
This branch line further connects Mumbai–Chennai line at Renigunta Junction and Chennai–KSR Bengaluru line at Katpadi Junction. This line also connects Dharmavarm–Pakala branch line at Pakala Junction. This line passes through pilgrim towns of Srikalahasti, Tirupati and also passes through the District Headquarters, Chittoor of Andhra Pradesh State. This line is double line up to Tirupati and single line thereafter up to Katpadi Junction.
