= Marathwada Sampark Kranti Express =

Train in India

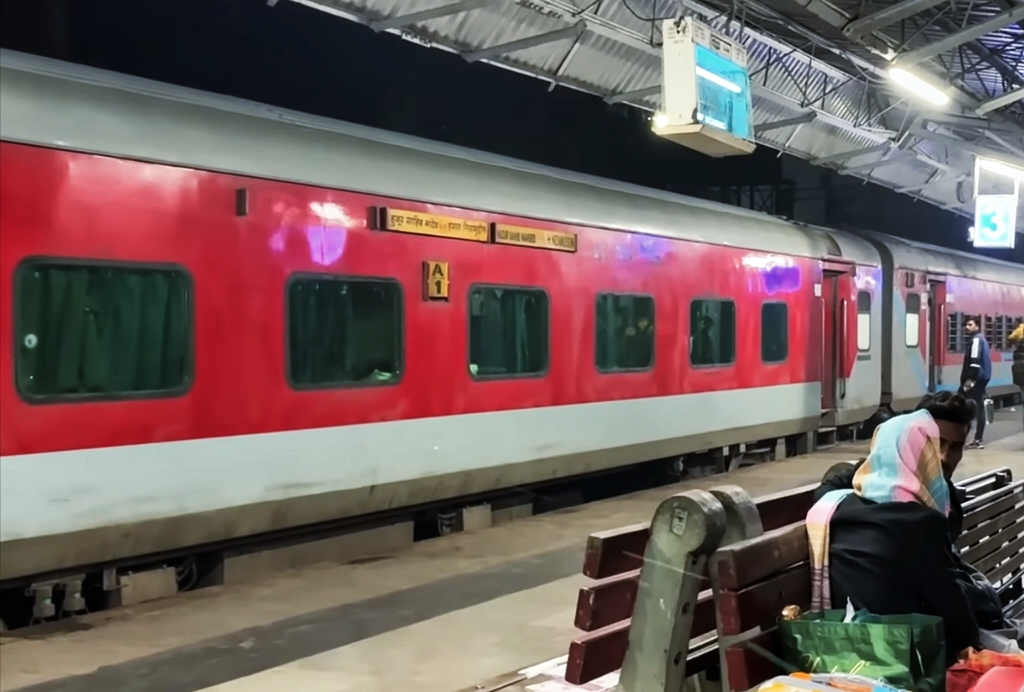
- Marathwada Sampark Kranti Express Arrived At Itarsi Junction railway station

Overview
- Service type: Sampark Kranti Express
- First service: March 19, 2019; 7 years ago
- Current operator: South Central Railways

Route
- Termini: Hazur Sahib Nanded (NED); Hazrat Nizamuddin (NZM)
- Stops: 7
- Distance travelled: 1,633 km (1,015 mi)
- Average journey time: 29 hours (Approx.)
- Service frequency: Weekly
- Train number: 12753 / 12754

On-board services
- Classes: AC 2 tier; AC 3 tier; Sleeper class; General
- Seating arrangements: Yes
- Sleeping arrangements: Yes
- Catering facilities: On-board catering
- Observation facilities: Large windows
- Baggage facilities: Yes

Technical
- Rolling stock: LHB coach
- Track gauge: 1,676 mm (5 ft 6 in)
- Operating speed: 58 km/h (36 mph) average including halts

The 12753 / 12754 Marathwada Sampark Kranti Express is a Superfast express train of the Sampark Kranti Express series belonging to Indian Railways – South Central Railway zone that runs between Hazur Sahib Nanded and Hazrat Nizamuddin in India.

== Background ==
It operates as train number 12753 from Hazur Sahib Nanded to Hazrat Nizamuddin and as train number 12754 in the reverse direction, serving the states of Maharashtra, Madhya Pradesh, Uttar Pradesh and Delhi.

It is the latest train introduced in the Sampark Kranti Express series which were originally started by the then railway minister of India Mr. Nitish Kumar.

== Coaches ==
The 12753 / 54 Hazur Sahib Nanded–Hazrat Nizamuddin Marathwada Sampark Kranti Express has one AC 2 tier, two AC 3 tier, six Sleeper class, four Unreserved/General and two Seating cum Luggage Rake Coaches. It does not carry a pantry car.

== Service ==
The service No.12753 towards Hazrat Nizamuddin leaves on Tuesdays and covers the distance of 1,633 km (1,015 mi) in 29 hours averaging 56.31 km/h (35 mph) and vice versa the service No.12754 towards Hazur Sahib Nanded leaves on Wednesdays on same route and reaches on Fridays.

== Route and halts ==
- Hazur Sahib Nanded
- Parbhani Junction
- Jalna
- Chhatrapati Sambhajinagar
- Manmad Junction
- Jalgaon Junction
- Bhusaval Junction
- Bhopal Junction
- Jhansi Junction
- Agra Cantonment
- Hazrat Nizamuddin

== Traction ==
As the route is fully electrified a BSL/WAP-4 or GZB/WAP-7 loco hauls this trains from Hazur Sahib Nanded to Hazrat Nizamuddin and vice versa.

== Rake sharing ==
This train shares rake sharing with 17635/17636 Hazur Sahib Nanded–Dharmavaram Junction Weekly Express via Nizamabad, Peddapalli, Warangal Vijayawada, Tirupati.
