= Pamani Express =

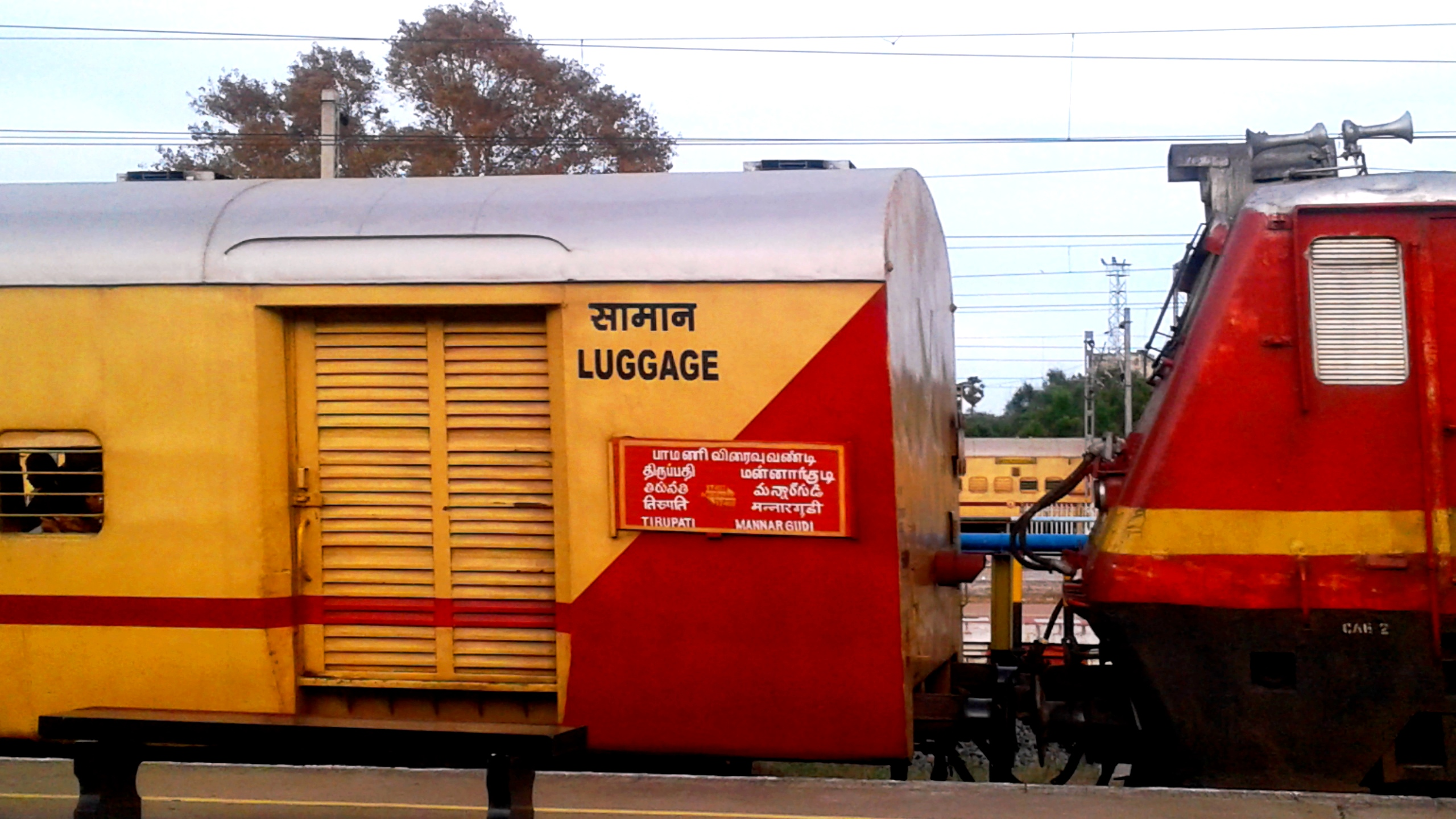
- Pamani Express at Viluppuram Junction

Overview
- Service type: Express
- Locale: Andhra Pradesh, Tamil Nadu
- First service: 03-07-2012
- Current operator: South Coast Railway zone

Route
- Termini: Tirupati; Mannargudi
- Distance travelled: 464 km (288 mi)
- Average journey time: 10 hrs 25 min
- Service frequency: Tri-weekly
- Train number: 17407 / 17408

On-board services
- Seating arrangements: Yes

Technical
- Operating speed: 45 km/h (28 mph) average with 17 halts
Route map
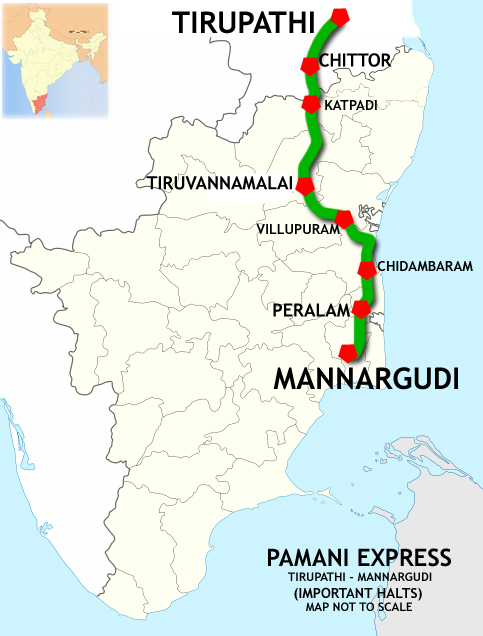

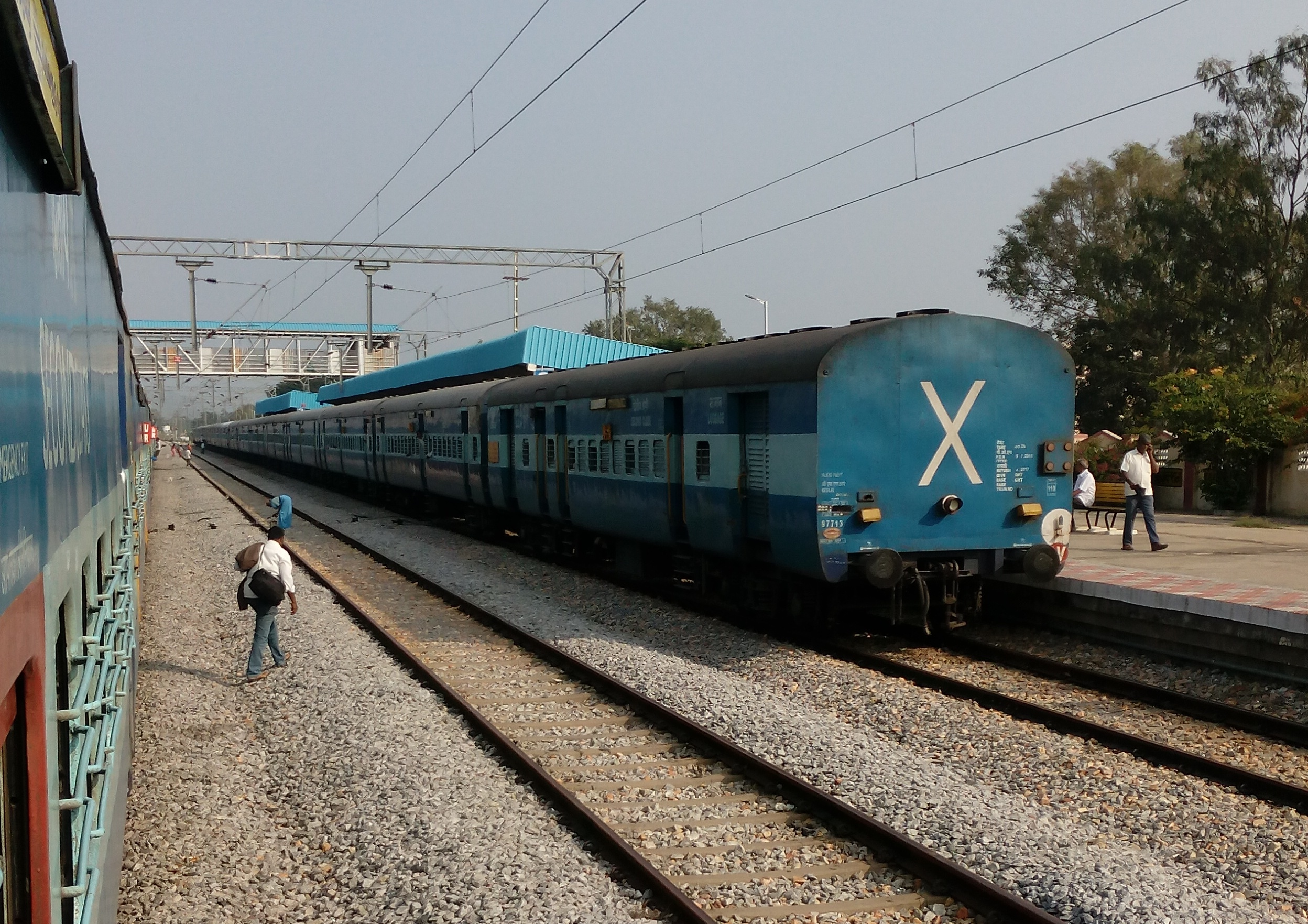
Pamani Express at Pakala

Pamani Express is an Express train belonging to Indian Railways connecting Tirupati in Andhra Pradesh with Mannargudi in Tamil Nadu.

It is named after the Pamani River. This is the only express train that Terminates and Originates from the Cauvery Delta Region and passes through Villupuram and does not go to Chennai. Similarly several other similar trains also originates and terminates in cauvery delta region which won't go to chennai but all of them passes through Tiruchirappalli.

In August 2024, there was a demand by the Tamil Nadu Consumer Protection and Environment Research Centre, Tiruvarur, to convert the train into a daily train.

== Coach composite ==
The train has standard LHB rake with max speed of 130 kmph. The train consists of 22 coaches:

- 6 Second Sitting (Denoted by D)
- 2 AC Three Tier (Denoted By B)
- 3 Sleeper-class (Denoted by S)
- 9 General
- 1 SLRD
- 1 EOG

Loco	1	2	3	4	5	6	7	8	9	10	11	12	13	14	15	16	17	18	19	20	21	22
	EOG	GEN	GEN	GEN	GEN	D6	D5	D4	D3	D2	D1	S3	S2	S1	B2	B1	GEN	GEN	GEN	GEN	GEN	SLRD

== Schedule ==
PAMANI EXPRESS - Schedule and timing as below

Train Number	Station Code	Departure Station	Departure Time	Departure Day	Arrival Station	Arrival Time	Arrival Day
17407	TPTY	Tirupati	11:55 AM	Tuesday, Thursday, Sunday	Mannargudi	10:20 PM	Same Day (Tuesday, Thursday, Sunday)
17408	MQ	Mannargudi	5:10AM	Monday, Wednesday, Friday	Tirupati	3:28 PM	Same Day (Monday, Wednesday, Friday)

== Route ==
This Train Has Following Stops

- Pakala Junction
- Chittoor
- Katpadi Junction
- Vellore Cantt
- Arani Road
- Polur
- Tiruvannamalai
- Thirukkovilur
- Villupuram Junction
- Panruti
- Cuddalore Port Junction
- Chidambaram
- Sirkazhi
- Vaithisvaran Koil
- Mayiladuthurai Junction
- Peralam Junction
- Thiruvarur Junction
- Nidamangalam Junction
