= Dharmavaram, Sri Sathya Sai district =

Dharmavaram
- Town
- Nickname: Silk City of Andhra Pradesh
- Location in Andhra Pradesh, India
- Coordinates: 14.43°N 77.72°E
- Country: India
- State: Andhra Pradesh
- District: Sri Sathya Sai District

Area
  - Total: 40.50 km^{2} (15.64 sq mi)

Population (2011)
  - Total: 121,874
  - Density: 3,009/km^{2} (7,794/sq mi)

Languages
  - Official: Telugu
- Time zone: UTC+5:30 (IST)
- PIN: 515671
- Telephone code: 91-08559
- Vehicle registration: AP-39
- Website: dharmavaram.cdma.ap.gov.in

Dharmavaram is a town in Sri Sathya Sai District of the Andhra Pradesh state of Indian country. It is mandal and divisional headquarters of Dharmavaram mandal and Dharmavaram revenue division respectively. The city is known for its handloom silk sarees. The city is renowned for cotton, silk weaving industries and leather puppets. The city is called as Silk city of Andhra Pradesh. Dharmavaram is famous for Handloom Weavers, Saree Designs, Jacquard designs, Silk Extraction from Silkworm Cacoons, Dyeing and it is fully populated by maximum weavers and by developing technology makes changes by producing various types of machine equipment emerging for weavers to weave quickly than the past decades and quality production was happening now and the production was famous for Sarees.

== Demographics ==
As of 2011 census, the town had a population of 121,874. The total population constitute, 62,250 males, 59,624 females –a sex ratio of 958 females per 1000 males, higher than the national average of 940 per 1000. 12,730 children are in the age group of 0–6 years, of which 6,834 are boys and 5,896 are girls—a sex ratio of 863 girls per 1000 boys. The average literacy rate stands at 71.07% with 77,564 literates, 44,055 male and 33,509 female, slightly lower than the national average of 73.00%.

== Economy ==
Dharmavaram is a hub for pure silk sarees. The economy of the town is dependent on the weaving industry. Farmers depend on rainwater due to lack of water resources. A major crop in this area is ground nuts.

== Education ==
The primary and secondary school education is imparted by the government, aided and private schools School Education Department of the state. The medium of instruction followed by different schools are English, Telugu, Urdu.

== Etymology ==
Dharmavaram tank was constructed by Kriyasakthi Odeyar. The name of the city was derived from the name of his mother, Dharmamba.

== Geography ==
Dharmavaram is located at 14.43°N 77.72°E. It has an average elevation of 345 metres (1131 feet).

== Governance ==
=== Civic administration ===
Dharmavaram Municipality was formed on 1 April 1964 as a Grade–III municipality. It is upgraded to Selection Grade and has a jurisdictional area of 42.50 km^{2} (16.41 mi^{2}) with 40 election wards. Each ward is represented by a ward member and the ward committee is headed by a chairperson. The present chairperson of the municipality is Beere Gopala Krishna and the commissioner is V. Mallikarjun.

== Transport ==
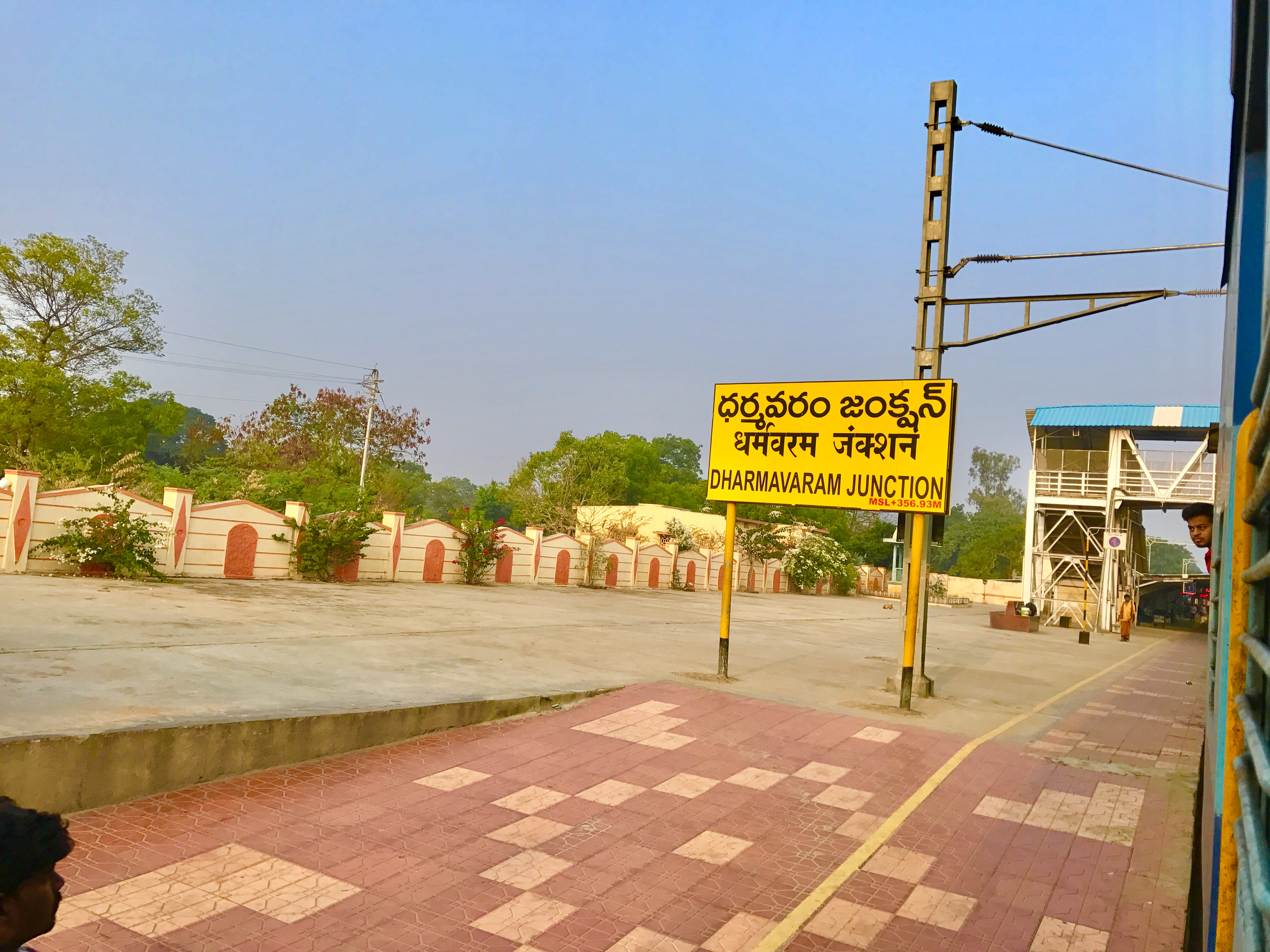
Dharmavaram Railway Station

The Andhra Pradesh State Road Transport Corporation operates bus services from Dharmavaram bus station. Dharmavaram Junction railway station is a major railway station located on the Guntakal–Bangalore section and the Dharmavaram–Pakala branch line. There are two trains starting from this station to Vijayawada and Machilipatnam
