= Tirupati–Coimbatore Intercity Express =

Train in India

Tirupati-Coimbatore Intercity Superfast Express
Overview
- Service type: Superfast
- First service: 25 January 2011; 15 years ago
- Current operator: Southern Railway

Route
- Termini: Tirupati (TPTY); Coimbatore (CBE)
- Stops: 8
- Distance travelled: 470 km (292 mi)
- Average journey time: 7 hours 15 mins
- Service frequency: 4 days a week
- Train number: 22615 / 22616

On-board services
- Classes: General Unreserved, AC Chair Car, Chair car
- Seating arrangements: Yes
- Sleeping arrangements: No
- Auto-rack arrangements: Overhead racks
- Catering facilities: E-catering
- Observation facilities: Large windows
- Baggage facilities: No
- Other facilities: Below the seats

Technical
- Rolling stock: LHB coach
- Track gauge: Broad Gauge
- Operating speed: 65 km/h (40 mph) average including halts.

The 22615 / 22616 Tirupati-Coimbatore Intercity Superfast Express is an superfast train belonging to Indian Railways Southern Railway zone that runs between Tirupati and Coimbatore Junction in India.

It operates as train number 22615 from Tirupati to Coimbatore Junction and as train number 22616 in the reverse direction serving the states of Andhra Pradesh & Tamil Nadu.

== Coaches ==
The 22615 / 16 Tirupati - Coimbatore Junction Intercity Express has 1 AC chair car, 9 chair car, 8 general unreserved , 1 SLR (seating with luggage rake) coaches & 1 EOG . It does not carry a pantry car coach.

As is customary with most train services in India, coach composition may be amended at the discretion of Indian Railways depending on demand.

== Service ==
The 22615 Tirupati - Coimbatore Junction Intercity Express covers the distance of 470 km (292 mi) in 7 hours 50 mins (60 km/h) and in 7 hours 40 mins as the 22616 Coimbatore Junction - Tirupati Intercity Express (61 km/h).

As the average speed of the train is higher than 55 km/h (34 mph), as per railway rules, its fare includes a Superfast surcharge.

== Routing ==
The 22615 / 16 Tirupati - Coimbatore Junction Intercity Express runs from Tirupati via Pakala Junction,Katpadi Junction,Jolarpettai Junction,Salem Junction, Erode Junction to Coimbatore Junction.

== Traction ==
As the route is fully electrified, an Erode Loco Shed or Arakkonam Loco Shed-based WAP-7 electric locomotive pulls the train to its destination.
