= Kadiri railway station =

Railway station in Andhra Pradesh

Coordinates: 14.1147°N 78.1654°E

Kadiri
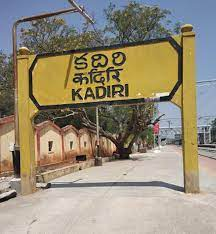
- Kadiri railway station board

General information
- Location: Railway Station Road, Gandhi nagar Kadiri; India
- System: Indian Railways station
- Owner: Indian Railways
- Operator: Guntakal railway division
- Line: Dharmavaram–Pakala branch line
- Platforms: 3
- Tracks: 4
- Connections: Auto Stand

Construction
- Structure type: Standard (on-ground station)
- Parking: Yes

Other information
- Status: Functioning
- Station code: KRY
- Fare zone: South Central Railway Zone

History
- Opened: 1892
- Electrified: 2020-21
Location

Kadiri railway station (station code: KRY) is located in the Anantapur district of Andhra Pradesh, India, and serves the city of Kadiri. It lies on the Dharmavaram–Pakala branch line and comes under the jurisdiction of Guntakal railway division of the South Central Railway zone. The railway line was constructed in 1891 along with the Railway Station and electrified in 2020. The platforms are well-sheltered compared to other stations on the same railway line. It is one of the major railway stations on this line.
