= Dharmavaram–Pakala branch line =

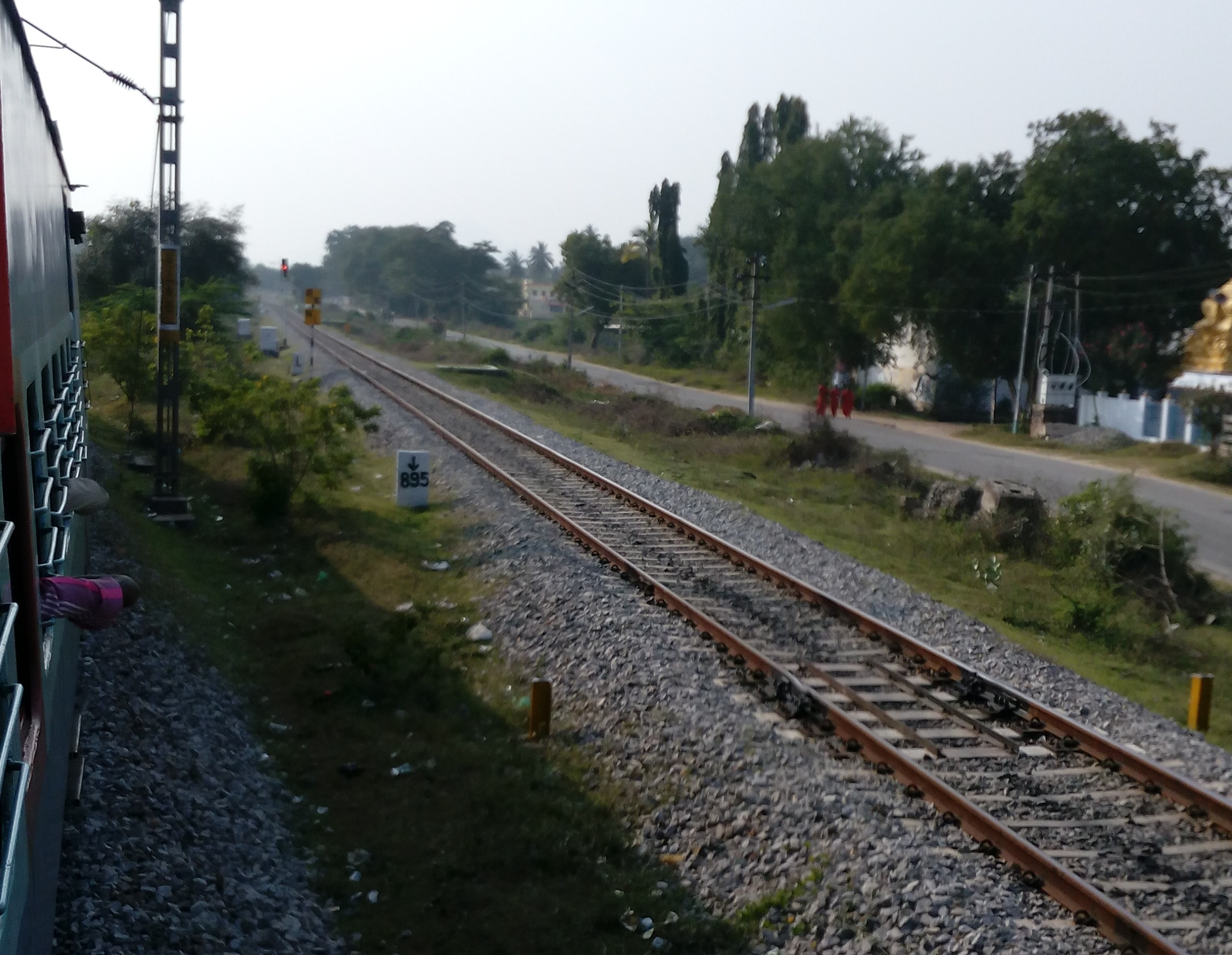
- Bifurcation of line towards Dharmavaram Junction

Overview
- Status: Operational
- Owner: Indian Railways
- Locale: Andhra Pradesh
- Termini: Dharmavaram Junction; Pakala Junction

Service
- Operator: South Coast Railway zone

History
- Opened: 1891

Technical
- Line length: 227.40 km (141.30 mi)
- Number of tracks: 1
- Track gauge: 5 ft 6 in (1,676 mm) broad gauge
- Electrification: Overhead

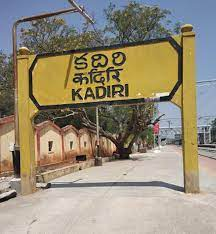
Kadiri Railway Station

The Dharmavaram–Pakala branch line connects Dharmavaram of Anantapur district with Pakala of Chittoor district in the Indian state of Andhra Pradesh. It is under the jurisdiction of Guntakal railway division.This railway line passes through the Sri Satya Sai district-Puttaparthi, Annamayya district-Madanapalle, Chittoor district-Chittoor and Tirupati district-Tirupati

== History ==
This branch line was built as a meter-gauge line during British Raj in India and opened for traffic in 1891. After independence, recently South Central Railway zone converted this line into a broad-gauge line, which opened for traffic on June 30, 2010. The railway line was sanctioned in the year 1997–98.

The Main Station in this line is:

- Dharmavaram Junction
- Kadiri Railway Station
- Madanapalle Road
- Pakala Junction
