= Chandragiri railway station =

Railway station in Andhra Pradesh, India

Chandragiri

General information
- Location: Chandragiri, Tirupati, Andhra Pradesh; India
- Coordinates: 13°35′00″N 79°19′00″E
- System: Indian Railways station
- Owner: Indian Railways
- Operator: Indian Railways
- Line: Renigunta–Katpadi section
- Platforms: 2
- Tracks: 5 ft 6 in (1,676 mm) broad gauge

Construction
- Structure type: Standard (on ground)
- Accessible: Disabled access

Other information
- Station code: MRK
- Zone(s): SCoR
- Division(s): Guntakal

History
- Electrified: 2003

Services
Preceding station	Indian Railways	Following station
Tirupati Main towards ?	Renigunta–Katpadi section	Kotala towards ?
Location
- Location within Andhra Pradesh Location within India

Chandragiri railway station (station code:CGI) is an Indian Railway station in Chandragiri, Tirupati located in Tirupati district of Andhra Pradesh. It is situated on Renigunta–Katpadi section and is administered by South Coast Railway zone.

== See also ==
- List of railway stations in India
