= Indian locomotive class WDP-1 =

Class of Indian diesel-electric locomotives

WDP-1
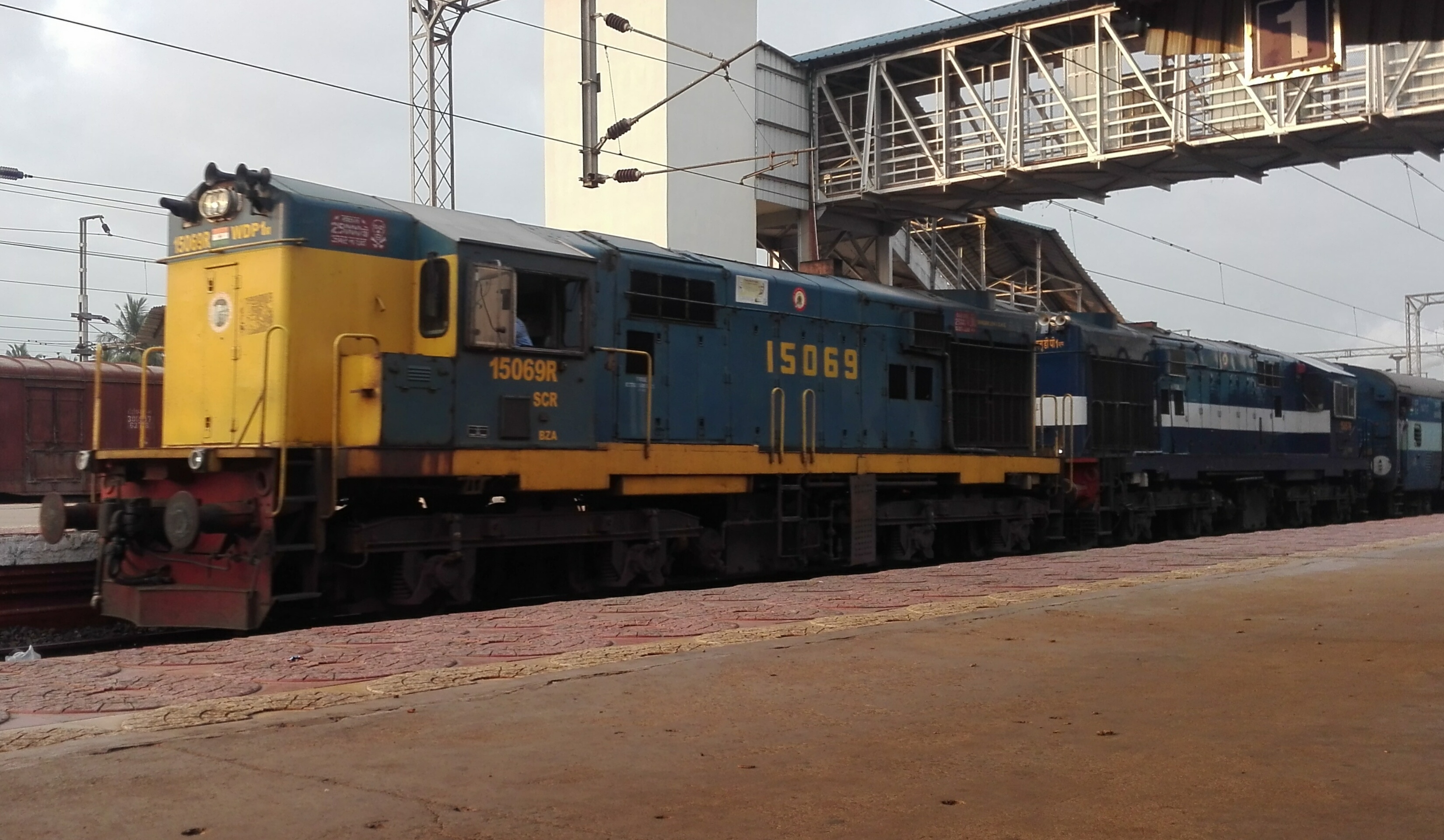
- BZA based WDP-1 hauling Shesadri express arrived Samalkot Jn.
Type and origin
- Power type: Diesel
- Builder: BLW
- Model: DL560C
- Build date: 1995–1999
- Total produced: 69
Specifications
- Configuration
  - UIC: Bo′Bo′
  - Commonwealth: Bo-Bo
- Gauge: 1,676 mm (5 ft 6 in)
- Bogies: Bo-Bo fabricated bogies loosely based on the Flexicoil models
- Wheel diameter: 1,092 mm (3 ft 7 in)
- Wheelbase: 12.834 m (42 ft 1 1/4 in)
- Length: 14.810 m (48 ft 7 1/8 in)
- Width: 2.95 m (9 ft 8 1/8 in)
- Height: 4.077 m (13 ft 4 1/2 in)
- Axle load: 20,000 kg (44,000 lb)
- Loco weight: 80,100 kg (176,600 lb)
- Fuel type: Diesel
- Fuel capacity: 5,000 L (1,100 imp gal; 1,300 US gal)
- Prime mover: ALCO 251-C
- RPM range: 390-400 rpm idling, 1,000 rpm at 8th notch
- Engine type: V12 diesel
- Aspiration: Turbo-supercharged
- Traction motors: BHEL 5002AZ CGL 7362A
- Cylinders: 12
- Cylinder size: 228 mm × 266 mm (8.98 in × 10.47 in) bore x stroke
- Transmission: Diesel–electric
- MU working: 2
- Train brakes: Air and Dual
Performance figures
- Maximum speed: 140 km/h (87 mph)
- Power output: Max: 2,300 hp (1,700 kW); Site rated: 2,000 hp (1,500 kW)
- Tractive effort: 20 t (20 long tons; 22 short tons)
Career
- Operators: Indian Railways
- Numbers: 15001-15069
- Locale: South Central Railway; Northern Railway; North Eastern Railway
- First run: 1995
- Disposition: active (only few operational)

The Indian locomotive class WDP-1 is a class of diesel–electric locomotive that was developed in 1995 by Banaras Locomotive Works (BLW) for Indian Railways. The model name stands for broad gauge (W), Diesel (D), Passenger traffic (P) engine, 1st generation (1). They entered service in 1995. A total of 69 WDP-1 units were built at Banaras Locomotive Works (BLW), Varanasi between 1995 and 1999.

Due to the introduction of more modern types of locomotives such as the WDG-4, and electrification, a insignificant number of examples are still in use, in mainline and departmental duties. As of September 2026, 7 locomotives still retain "operational status" on the mainline.

== History ==
The WDP-1 is a lower powered version of the WDM-2. These locos have a 2300 hp powerpack, . The engine is a converted version of the Alco 251C model with a 12-cylinder engine and low overall weight with a max. speed of 140 km/h, Bo-Bo fabricated bogies loosely based on the Flexicoil models. They are still in service and are homed either at TKD & BZA to haul short commuter trains and shunting around the area. They look just like all other ALCOs and are easily identified by the laterally “sculpted” and baldie grille-less short hood.

WDP1M is a rebuilt version with better powerpack and better cooling via a modified radiator. The biggest change is in the suspension. Rubber springs have been provided instead of coil springs, along with other changes to the suspension and axle components.

The scrapping of these locomotives has begun. All WDP-1 locomotives of BZA DLS were condemned in February 2023 and scrapped at DLS.

== Locomotive sheds ==
Zone	Name	Shed Code	Quantity
Northern Railway	Tughlakabad	TKDD	7
Total Locomotives Active as of September 2026			7

=== Former sheds ===
Zone	Name	Shed Code
South Central Railway	Kazipet	KZJD
South Central Railway	Vijayawada	BZAD
North Eastern Railway	Izzatnagar	IZND

== See also ==
- Indian locomotive class WDM-2
- List of diesel locomotives of India
- Rail transport in India#History
- Rail transport in India
