= Dharmavaram Junction railway station =

Railway Station in Andhra Pradesh

Coordinates: 14.4261°N 77.7152°E

Dharmavaram Junction
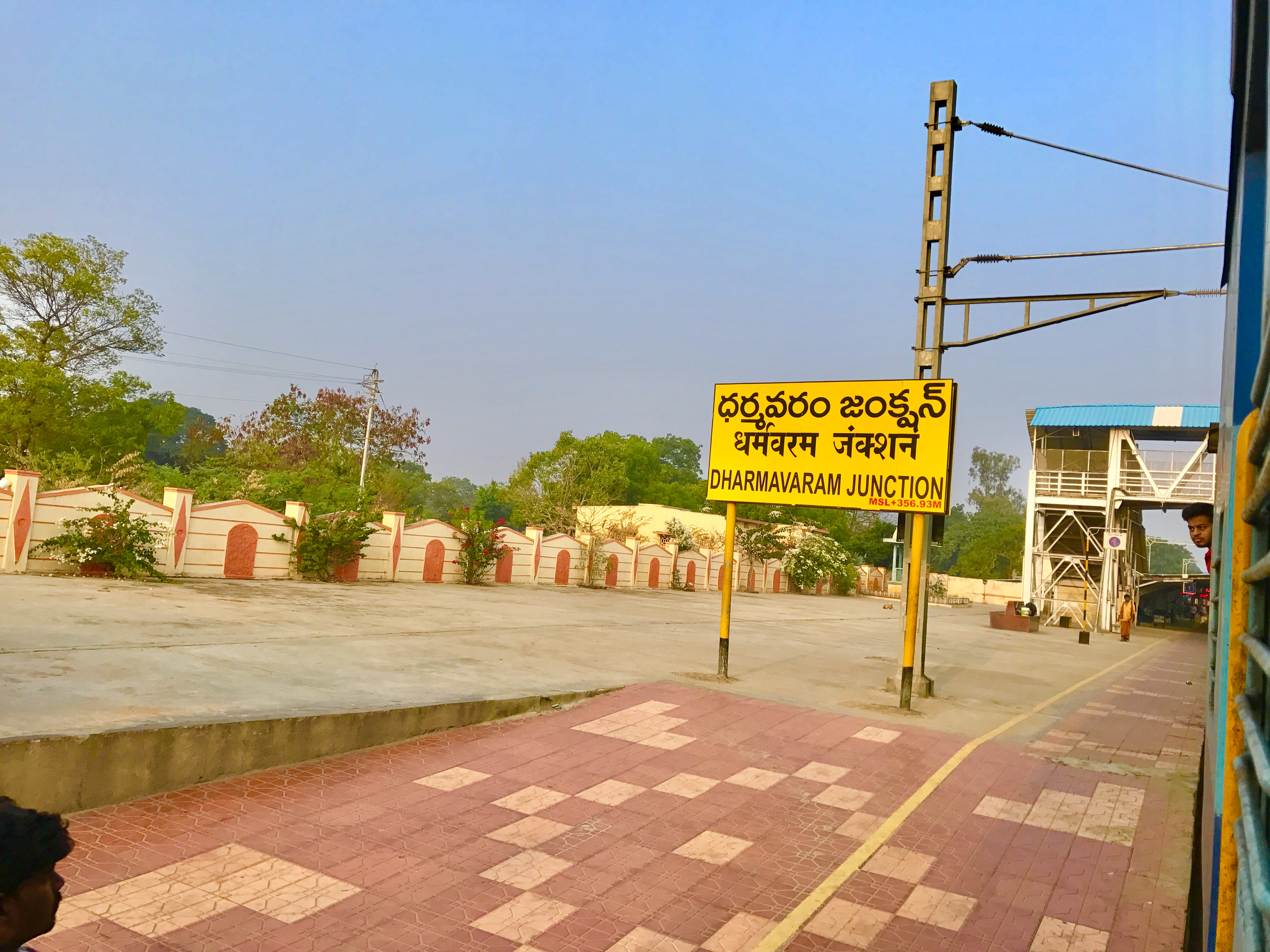
- Dharmavaram Junction signboard

General information
- Location: Dharmavaram, Sri Sathya Sai district, Andhra Pradesh; India
- Elevation: 371 m (1,217 ft)
- System: Indian Railways station
- Owner: Indian Railways
- Lines: Guntakal–Bangalore section, Dharmavarm–Pakala branch line, Dharmavaram-Satya Sai Prasanthi Nilayam-Penukonda line.
- Platforms: 5

Construction
- Parking: Available
- Cycle facilities: Yes

Other information
- Status: Functional
- Station code: DMM
- Fare zone: South Coast Railway zone
Location
- Location within Andhra Pradesh Location within India

Dharmavaram Junction (station code:DMM) is the primary railway station serving Dharmavaram, Sri Sathya Sai district. It is one of the major train junctions in Andhra Pradesh. The station falls under the jurisdiction of Guntakal division of South Coast Railways. The station has five platforms.

== Originating trains ==
At present three services originates from this station, the Machilipatnam – Dharmavaram Express (via:- Gooty Fort,Yerraguntla Jn,Nandyal Jn,Guntur Jn) and Dharmavaram- Narasapur Express (via Tirupati, Vijayawada Jn,Gudivada Jn., Bhimavaram Jn.) and Dharamavam - Hazur Sahib Nanded Weekly express (via:- Tirupati, Vijayawada, Warangal, Karimnagar, Nizamabad Jn)

== Routes ==
Dharmavaram Junction station is an important junction. 3 routes passes through this station connecting Tirupati, Bengaluru & Guntakal. 1st route is 283.7 kilometres (176.3 mi) long Guntakal–Bangalore section. 2nd route is 228.3 kilometres (141.9 mi) long Dharmavarm–Pakala branch line connecting Pakala, 42 kilometres (26 mi) from Tirupati. 3rd route is 53.5 kilometres (33.2 mi) long Dharmavaram-Satya Sai Prasanthi Nilayam-Penukonda line. The Rajdhani Express & Karnataka Express runs through this line. From Dharmavaram, Bengaluru via Hindupuram is 182 kilometres (113 mi) & via Satya Sai Prasanthi Nilayam is 192 kilometres (119 mi). From Dharmavaram, Tirupati is 270 kilometres (170 mi), Guntakal is 101.7 kilometres (63.2 mi) & Gooty is 90.3 kilometres (56.1 mi).
