= Renigunta Junction railway station =

Railway Station in Andhra Pradesh

Renigunta Junction, Tirupati
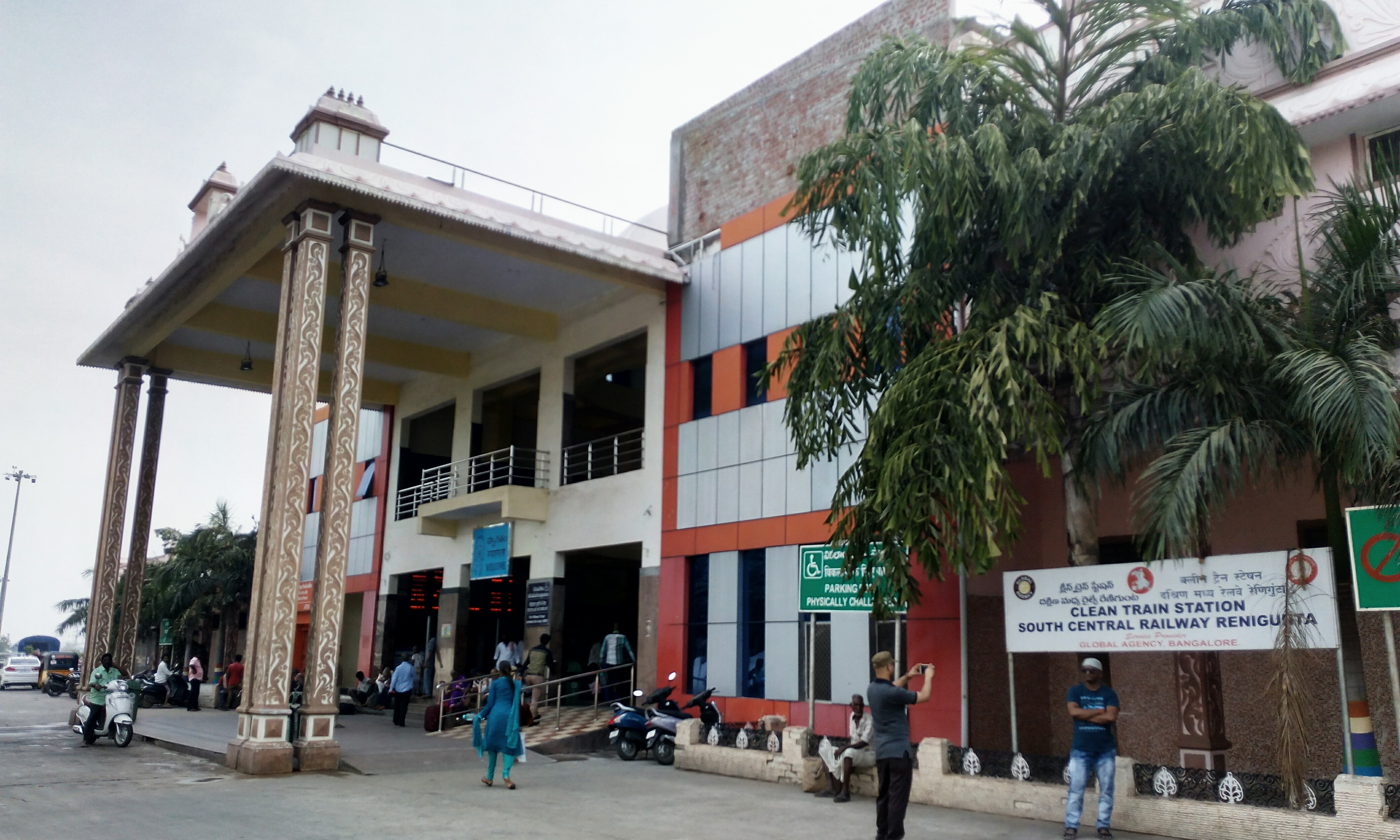
- Renigunta Junction Main Entrance

General information
- Location: Renigunta, Tirupati, Andhra Pradesh
- Coordinates: 13°39′N 79°31′E
- Elevation: 113 m (371 ft)
- System: Indian Railways station
- Lines: Gudur–Katpadi branch line, Mumbai–Chennai line
- Platforms: 5

Construction
- Structure type: Standard (on ground station)

Other information
- Status: Functioning
- Station code: RU
- Zone(s): South Coast Railway
- Division(s): Guntakal
Location
- Location within Andhra Pradesh Location within India

Renigunta Junction railway station (station code: RU) is a railway station located in Tirupati district in the Indian state of Andhra Pradesh. It serves Tirupati city and its suburban areas in Tirupati district. People alight here to go to Tirupati for pilgrimage and it also has bus connection to various Tirupati temples from this Railway station. It is a major junction station with branch lines to Arakkonam Junction and Katpadi Junction via Tirupati Main.

== Classification ==
Renigunta Junction is classified as an A–category station in the Guntakal railway division.

Preceding station	Indian Railways	Following station
Renigunta Chord Cabin towards ?	South Central Railway zone Vijayawada–Chennai section of Howrah–Chennai main line	Tiruchanur towards ?
Renigunta Bypass Cabin towards ?	South Central Railway zone Gudur–Renigunta–Arakkonam branch line	Pudi towards ?
