= Tirupati railway station =

Railway station in Andhra Pradesh, India

Tirupati

General information
- Location: Tata Nagar, Tirupati, Andhra Pradesh; India
- Coordinates: 13°37′40″N 79°25′10″E
- Elevation: 150 m (492 ft)
- System: Indian Railways station
- Owner: Indian Railway
- Operator: South Coast Railway, predecessor South Central Railway
- Line: Gudur–Katpadi branch line
- Platforms: 6
- Tracks: 8

Construction
- Structure type: Standard (on-ground station)
- Parking: Available

Other information
- Status: Functioning
- Station code: TPTY
- Zone(s): South Coast Railway zone
- Division(s): Guntakal

History
- Opened: 1891
- Rebuilt: Pending
- Former names: Tirupati East

Passengers
- 15,0000: 4 Crore ▲185%
Location
- Location within Andhra Pradesh Location within India
- Interactive map

Tirupati railway station (station code: TPTY) is a railway station located in the Indian state of Andhra Pradesh. It serves Tirupati and experiences a regular flow of tourists visiting the Tirumala Venkateswara Temple in the Tirupati district. It is an environmentally friendly station, and has been awarded a Gold rating by the Indian Green Building Council. There are several railway stations that fall within the city limits of Tirupati, namely Tiruchanur, Renigunta Junction, Tirupati West Halt, and Chandragiri railway station.

== History ==
The metre-gauge line of the South Indian Railway Company was opened in 1891. The line originally started from Villupuram in the South Arcot district and passed through Katpadi and Chittoor to Pakala. The Gudur–Katpadi line, covering Tirupati, has since been converted to broad gauge.

== Gallery ==
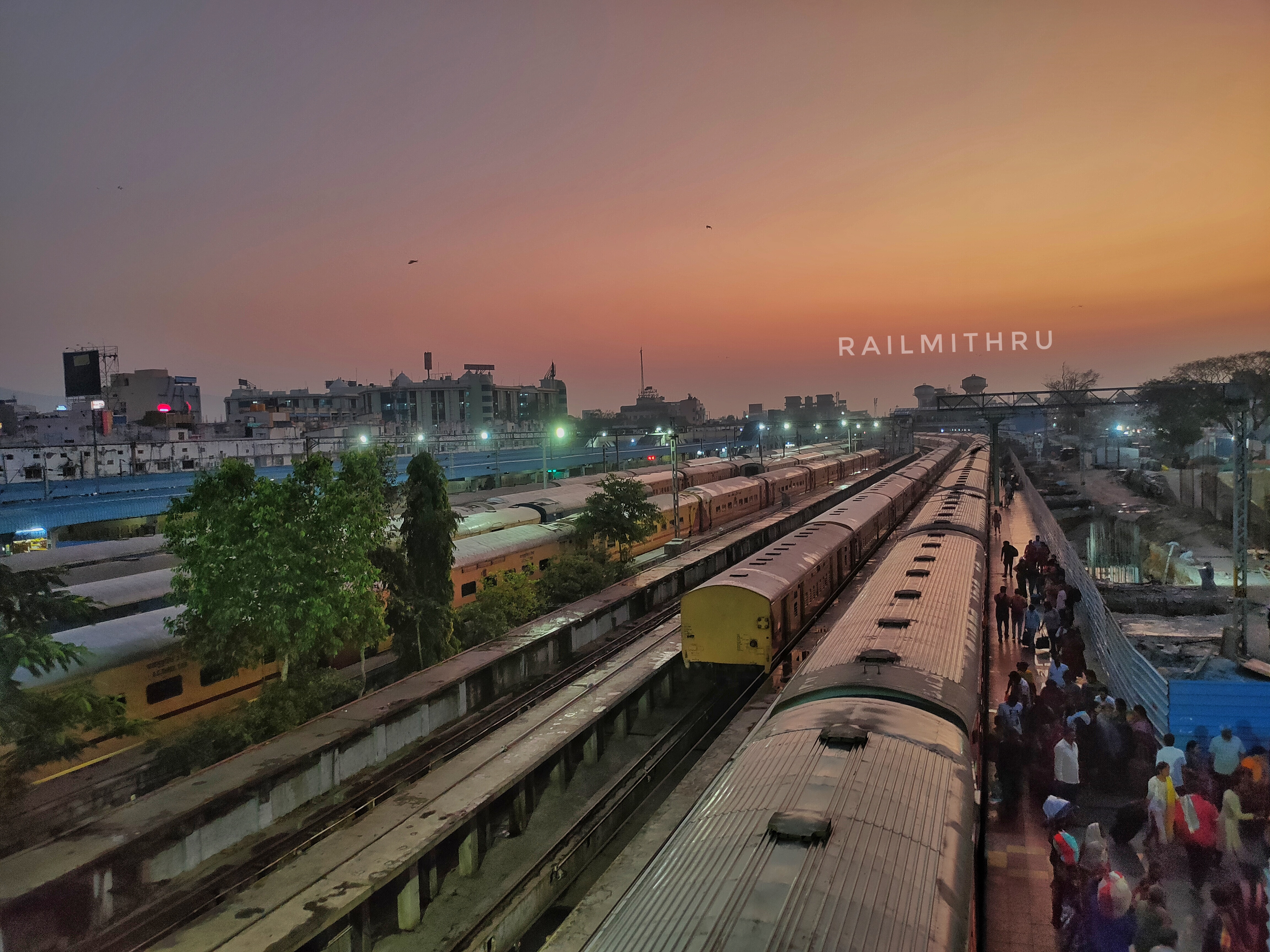
Tirupati railway station view from Platform 6 on a spring Morning

== Classification ==
Tirupati is classified as an A1–category station in the Guntakal railway division. It is one of the top one hundred booking stations among the Indian railways.

== Structure and amenities ==
There are solar panels installed on the rooftop of stations along the railway, including 500 MW solar energy panels.

The following facilities have been upgraded recently with an estimated cost of around 11 Crores:

- A new waiting hall in platforms 4 and 5 for the convenience of travelers, with a seating capacity of 210 people, in an area of over 1.200 square meters.
- High-speed Wi-Fi and LED TV facilities.
- A cloakroom on platform 1, with an area of 100 square meters. Around 50 steel racks have been installed in the room for the safe deposit of passenger luggage.
- The existing booking office, announcement facility, and display board area have been renovated.
- A premium lounge of over 350 square meters has been developed in platform 1 with an estimated cost of around 1.06 crores. It has state of the art facilities for travelers, including washrooms, lounges, and food and drink locations.

Preceding station	Indian Railways	Following station
Tiruchanur towards ?	South Central Railway zone Gudur–Katpadi branch line	Tirupati West Halt towards ?
