= Hazur Sahib Nanded–Tiruchanur Weekly Express =

Train in India

Hazur Sahib Nanded - Tiruchanur Weekly Express
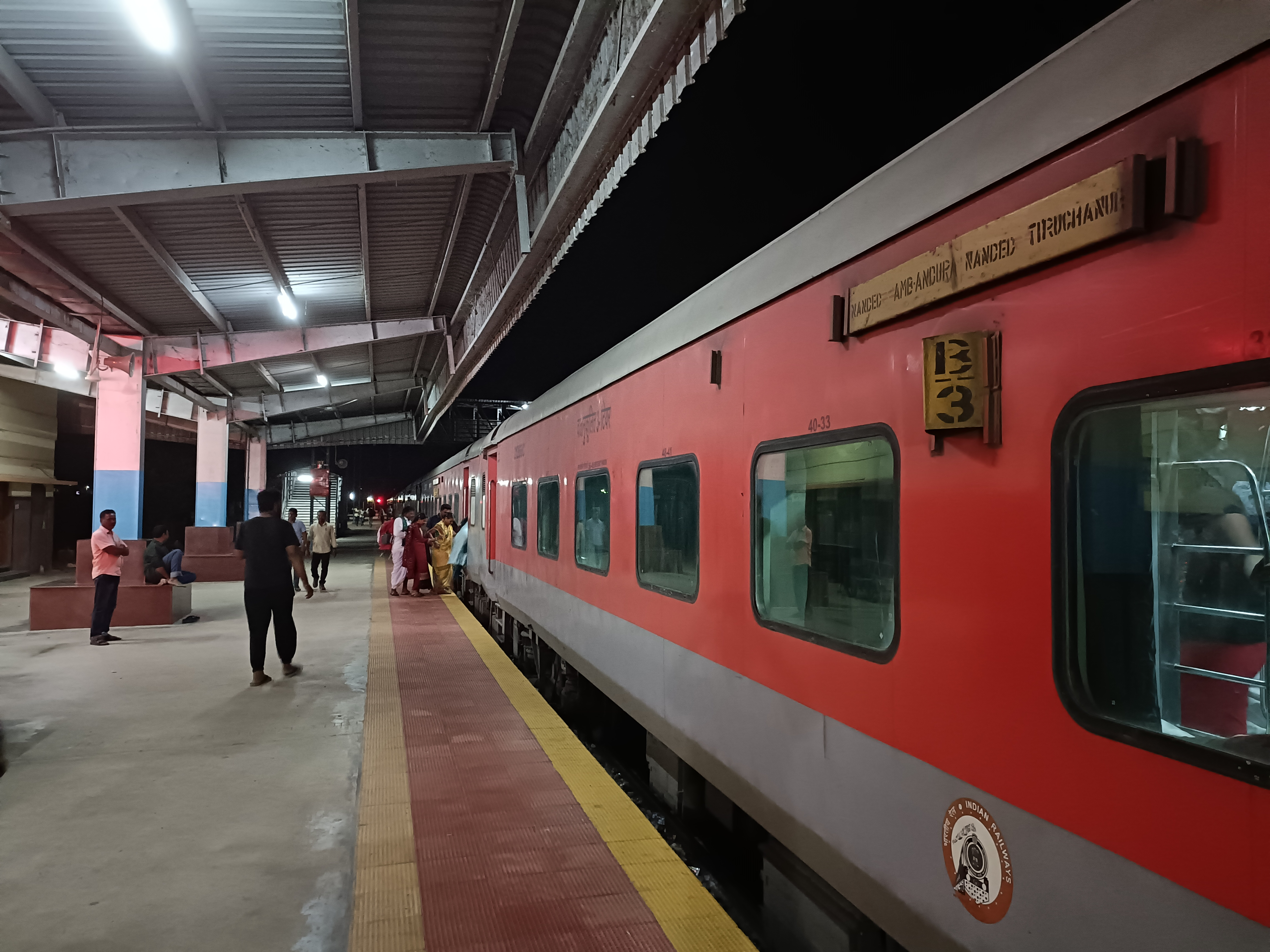
- Train No. 17633 Hazur Sahib Nanded - Tiruchanur Weekly Express at Koratla railway station

Overview
- Service type: Express
- Status: Active
- Locale: Maharashtra, Telangana and Andhra Pradesh
- First service: 9 May 2026; 57 days ago
- Current operator: South Central (SC)

Route
- Termini: Hazur Sahib Nanded (NED); Tiruchanur (TCNR)
- Stops: 19
- Distance travelled: 959 km (596 mi)
- Average journey time: 19h 35m
- Service frequency: Weekly
- Train number: 17633 / 17634

On-board services
- Classes: General Unreserved, Sleeper Class, AC 3rd Class, AC 2nd Class, AC 1st Class
- Seating arrangements: No
- Sleeping arrangements: Yes
- Catering facilities: E-Catering
- Observation facilities: Large windows
- Baggage facilities: No
- Other facilities: Below the seats

Technical
- Rolling stock: LHB coach
- Track gauge: 1,676 mm (5 ft 6 in)
- Electrification: 25 kV 50 Hz AC Overhead line
- Operating speed: 130 km/h (81 mph) maximum, 49 km/h (30 mph) average including halts.
- Track owner: Indian Railways
Route map
- Hazur Sahib Nanded - Tiruchanur Express Route Map (Important Halts) Hazur Sahib Nanded - Tiruchanur Express Route Map (All Halts)

The 17633 / 17634 Hazur Sahib Nanded–Tiruchanur Weekly Express is an express train belonging to South Central Railway zone that runs between the city Hazur Sahib Nanded of Maharashtra and Tiruchanur of Andhra Pradesh in India.

It operates as train number 17633 from Hazur Sahib Nanded to Tiruchanur and as train number 17634 in the reverse direction, serving the states of Andhra Pradesh, Telangana and Maharashtra.

== Services ==
• 17633/ Hazur Sahib Nanded–Tiruchanur Weekly Express has an average speed of 49 km/h and covers 959 km in 19h 35m.

• 17634/ Tiruchanur–Hazur Sahib Nanded Weekly Express has an average speed of 42 km/h and covers 959 km in 22h 35m.

== Routes and halts ==
The Halts of the train are :

● Hazur Sahib Nanded

● Basar

● Nizamabad Junction

● Koratla

● Lingampet Jagityal

● Karimnagar

● Peddapalli Junction

● Jammikunta

● Warangal

● Mahabubabad

● Khammam

● Vijayawada Junction

● Tenali Junction

● Bapatla

● Chirala

● Ongole

● Nellore

● Renigunta Junction

● Tiruchanur

== Coach composition ==
The train has 1 AC 1-Tier, 1 AC 2-Tier, 4 AC 3-Tier, 6 Sleeper class, 4 Second class, 1 Head-on Generator car and 1 Seating-cum-Luggage Rake (total of 18 LHB coach).

Loco	1	2	3	4	5	6	7	8	9	10	11	12	13	14	15	16	17	18
	HOG	GS	GS	S6	S5	S4	S3	S2	S1	B4	B3	B2	B1	A1	H1	GS	GS	SLR

== Traction ==
As the entire route is fully electrified it is hauled by a Lalaguda Loco Shed (LGD) based WAP-7 electric locomotive from Hazur Sahib Nanded to Tiruchanur and vice versa.

== Rake Reversal or rake share ==
The train will reverse 1 times :

1. Peddapalli Junction

The train will Rake Sharing with Hazur Sahib Nanded–Una Himachal Express (22709/22710).

== See also ==
Trains from Hazur Sahib Nanded :

1. Hazur Sahib Nanded–Amritsar Superfast Express
2. Marathwada Sampark Kranti Express
3. KSR Bengaluru–Hazur Sahib Nanded Express
4. Hazur Sahib Nanded–Shri Ganganagar Weekly Express
5. Hazur Sahib Nanded–Jammu Tawi Humsafar Express

Trains from Tiruchanur :

1. Kacheguda–Tiruchanur Express
2. Charlapalli–Tiruchanur Express (via Kurnool City)
3. Charlapalli–Tiruchanur Express (via Warangal)

== Notes ==
a. Runs 1 day in a week with both directions.
