= Suratgarh–Bathinda line =

Railway line between Bikaner and Bathinda

Bikaner–Bathinda Main Line

Overview
- Native name: बीकानेर–बठिंडा मुख्य रेलमार्ग
- Status: Operational
- Owner: Indian Railways
- Locale: Rajasthan and Punjab
- Termini: Bikaner Junction; Bathinda Junction

Service
- Operator(s): North Western Railway; Northern Railway

Technical
- Line length: 324 km (201 mi)
- Track gauge: 1,676 mm (5 ft 6 in) Broad Gauge
- Old gauge: 1,000 mm (3 ft 3 3/8 in) Metre gauge
- Electrification: Yes

The Bikaner–Bathinda Main Line is a railway line connecting Bikaner Junction in Rajasthan with Bathinda Junction in Punjab via Suratgarh Junction and Hanumangarh Junction. The line is 324 km (201 mi) long.

From Suratgarh Junction, railway lines go to Anupgarh (77 km (48 mi)) and Sri Ganganagar Junction (137 km (85 mi)). From Hanumangarh Junction, railway lines go to Sri Ganganagar Junction (66 km (41 mi)) and Sadulpur Junction (178 km (111 mi)).

== History ==
The main railway line from Suratgarh Junction to Bathinda Junction via Shri Ganganagar was originally built by Bikaner State Railway company of Bikaner Princely State and Southern Punjab Railway of Punjab Province portion as metre-gauge line was constructed on different phases.

- The first phase, from Suratgarh Junction to Rai Singh Nagar was opened on 1 October 1925.
- The second phase, from Rai Singh Nagar to Kesrisinghpur was opened on 1 September 1927.
- The third phase, from Kesrisinghpur to Shri Ganganagar Junction was opened on 1 May 1926.
- The fourth phase, from Bathinda Junction to Hindumalkote (the portion of Delhi–Bathinda–Mcleodganj–Sammasatta line) was opened on 10 November 1897.
- The Fifth phase, from Hindumalkote to Shri Ganganagar Junction was opened on 1970.

Whereas, the branch line from Sarupsar Junction to Anupgarh which comes under the portion of Bikaner State Railway was opened on 30 March 1929.

After that, the conversion of main line into 5 ft 6 in (1,676 mm) broad gauge was sanctioned in 1997–98, Which it was important for military purpose because this railway line also passes through nearest of International border of India, was opened in different sections.

- The first phase, between Shri Ganganagar and Sarupsar Junction was opened on 9 June 2012.
- The second phase, between Suratgarh and Anupgarh was opened on 25 July 2013.

After that, the new branch line between Abohar Junction and Fazilka was started construction on 2004 for easier transport of nearby Indian International borders and after some years it was opened on 12 July 2012.

== Trains Passing through this line ==
- Kochuveli–Shri Ganganagar Junction Express
- Bikaner–Delhi Sarai Rohilla Superfast Express
- Hazur Sahib Nanded–Shri Ganganagar Weekly Express
- Firozpur Cantonment–Shri Ganganagar Express
