= Haridwar–Shri Ganganagar Intercity Express =

Express train in India

Haridwar - Shri Ganganagar Intercity Express
Overview
- Service type: Express
- Current operator: North Western Railway zone

Route
- Termini: Haridwar; Shri Ganganagar Junction
- Stops: 19
- Distance travelled: 487 km (303 mi)
- Average journey time: 9 hours 55 mins
- Service frequency: Daily
- Train number: 14711 / 14712

On-board services
- Classes: AC Chair car, general unreserved, Chair car
- Seating arrangements: Yes
- Sleeping arrangements: No
- Catering facilities: No
- Observation facilities: Rake Sharing with 12481 / 12482 Delhi - Sri Ganganagar Intercity Express & 14731 / 14732 Delhi - Fazilka Intercity Express

Technical
- Rolling stock: Standard Indian Railways Coaches
- Track gauge: 1,676 mm (5 ft 6 in)
- Operating speed: 50.5 km/h (31 mph)

The 14711 / 12 Haridwar - Shri Ganganagar Intercity Express is an Express train belonging to Indian Railways North Western Railway zone that runs between Haridwar and Shri Ganganagar Junction in India.

It operates as train number 14711 from Haridwar to Shri Ganganagar Junction and as train number 14712 in the reverse direction serving the states of Uttrakhand, Uttar Pradesh, Haryana, Punjab & Rajasthan.

== Coaches ==
The 14711 / 12 Haridwar - Shri Ganganagar Intercity Express has one AC 3 Tier, one AC Chair Car, four chair car, seven general unreserved & two SLR (seating with luggage rake) coaches . It does not carry a pantry car coach.

As is customary with most train services in India, coach composition may be amended at the discretion of Indian Railways depending on demand.

== Service ==
The 14711 Haridwar - Shri Ganganagar Junction Intercity Express covers the distance of 487 km (303 mi) in 9 hours 50 mins (49 km/h) and in 9 hours 20 mins as the 14712 Shri Ganganagar Junction - Haridwar Intercity Express (52 km/h).

As the average speed of the train is less than 55 km/h (34 mph), as per railway rules, its fare doesn't includes a Superfast surcharge.

== Routing ==
The 14711 / 12 Haridwar - Shri Ganganagar Intercity Express runs from Haridwar via Saharanpur Junction, Ambala Cantonment Junction, Rajpura Junction, Patiala, Bathinda Junction to Shri Ganganagar Junction.

== Traction ==
As the route is going to be electrified, a Bathinda Junction based WDM-3A diesel locomotive pulls the train to its destination.
