= Jhalawar City–Shri Ganganagar Superfast Express =

Train in India

Overview
- Service type: Superfast Express
- First service: 12 March 2019; 7 years ago
- Current operator: West Central Railway

Route
- Termini: Jhalawar City (JLWC); Shri Ganganagar Junction (SGNR)
- Stops: 29
- Distance travelled: 1,015 km (631 mi)
- Average journey time: 18 hours 30 mins
- Service frequency: Tri-weekly
- Train number: 22997 / 22998

On-board services
- Classes: AC 2 Tier, AC 3 Tier, Sleeper Class, General Unreserved
- Seating arrangements: Yes
- Sleeping arrangements: Yes
- Catering facilities: No pantry car attached but E-catering available
- Observation facilities: Large windows
- Baggage facilities: No
- Other facilities: Below the seats

Technical
- Rolling stock: LHB coach
- Track gauge: 1,676 mm (5 ft 6 in)
- Operating speed: 57 km/h (35 mph) average including halts.

The 22997 / 22998 Jhalawar City–Shri Ganganagar Superfast Express is a superfast express train belonging to West Central Railway zone of Indian Railways that run between Jhalawar City and Shri Ganganagar Junction of Rajasthan state in India.

== Coach composition ==
The train has standard LHB rakes with a maximum speed of 130 km/h. The train consists of 21 coaches:

- 1 AC I Tier and AC II Tier (HA1)
- 1 AC II Tier(A1)
- 5 AC III Tier(B1-B5)
- 8 Sleeper coaches(S1-S8)
- 4 General Unreserved(GS)
- 2 End-on Generators(EOG)

== Service ==
22997/ Jhalawar City–Shri Ganganagar Superfast Express has an average speed of 55 km/h and covers 1015 km in 18 hrs 30 mins.

The 22998/Shri Ganganagar–Jhalawar City Superfast Express has an average speed of 56 km/h and covers 1015 km in 18 hrs 15 mins.

== Route and halts ==
The important halts of the train are:

- Jhalawar City
- Ramganj Mandi Junction
- Dakaniya Talav
- Kota Junction
- Sawai Madhopur Junction
- Durgapura
- Jaipur Junction
- Phulera Junction
- Sambhar Lake Town
- Makrana Junction
- Degana Junction
- Nagaur
- Bikaner Junction
- Lalgarh Junction
- Suratgarh Junction
- Hanumangarh Junction
- Shri Ganganagar Junction

== Schedule ==
Train number	Station code	Departure station	Departure time	Departure day	Arrival station	Arrival time	Arrival day
22997	JLWC	Jhalawar City	15:25 PM	Sun, Wed, Thu	Shri Ganganagar Junction	09:55 AM	Mon, Thu, Fri
22998	SGNR	Shri Ganganagar Junction	17:40 PM	Tue, Wed, Sat	Jhalawar City	11:55 AM	Sun, Wed, Thu

== Traction ==
It is hauled by a Tughlakabad-based WAP-7 locomotive from JLWC to SWM and handing over to a Bhagat Ki Kothi-based WDP-4 locomotive from SWM to SGNR and vice versa.

== Direction reversal ==
Train reverses its direction at:

- Sawai Madhopur Junction
- Hanumangarh Junction

== Rake sharing ==
The train shares its rake with 22981/22982 Kota–Shri Ganganagar Superfast Express.
