= Kota–Shri Ganganagar Superfast Express =

Train in India

Kota-Shri Ganganagar Superfast Express

Overview
- Service type: Superfast
- Status: Operating
- First service: 9 April 2013; 13 years ago
- Current operator: West Central Railway

Route
- Termini: Kota Junction (KOTA); Shri Ganganagar Junction (SGNR)
- Stops: 25
- Distance travelled: 917 km (570 mi)
- Average journey time: 16 hrs 35 mins
- Service frequency: 4 days a week. (Note: Runs four days in a week for every direction.)
- Train number: 22981 / 22982

On-board services
- Classes: AC 2 Tier, AC 3 Tier, Sleeper Class, General Unreserved
- Seating arrangements: Yes
- Sleeping arrangements: Yes
- Catering facilities: On-board Catering; E-Catering
- Observation facilities: Large windows
- Baggage facilities: No
- Other facilities: Below the seats

Technical
- Rolling stock: LHB coach
- Track gauge: 1,676 mm (5 ft 6 in)
- Operating speed: 55 km/h (34 mph) average including halts.
Route map
- via Hanumangarh, Suratgarh, Bikaner, Nagaur, Jaipur, Sawai Madhopur

The 22981 / 22982 Kota–Shri Ganganagar Superfast Express is a superfast train belonging to West Central Railway zone that runs between Kota Junction and Shri Ganganagar Junction in India.

It is currently being operated with 22981/22982 train numbers on four days a week basis.

== Coach composition ==
The train has standard LHB rakes with a maximum speed of 130 km/h. The train consists of 21 coaches :

- 1 AC I Tier and II Tier
- 1 AC II Tier
- 5 AC III Tier
- 8 Sleeper Coaches
- 4 General Unreserved
- 2 End-on Generator

== Service ==
The 22981/Kota - Shri Ganganagar Superfast Express has an average speed of 55 km/h and covers 917 km in 16 hrs 35 mins.

The 22982/Shri Ganganagar - Kota Superfast Express has an average speed of 56 km/h and covers 917 km in 16 hrs 15 mins.

== Route and halt ==
The important halts of the train are:

- Kota Junction
- Lakheri
- Indargarh Sumerganj Mandi
- Sawai Madhopur Junction
- Chauth Ka Barwara
- Isarda
- Durgapura
- Jaipur Junction
- Asalpur Jobner
- Phulera Junction
- Sambhar Lake Town
- Nawa City
- Makrana Junction
- Degana Junction
- Nagaur
- Nokha
- Deshnoke
- Bikaner Junction
- Lunkaransar
- Mahajan
- Suratgarh Junction
- PiliBanga
- Hanumangarh Junction
- Sadul Shahar
- Shri Ganganagar Junction

== Schedule ==
Train Number	Station Code	Departure Station	Departure Time	Departure Day	Arrival Station	Arrival Time	Arrival Day
22981	KOTA	Kota Junction	17:20 PM	Mon, Tue, Fri, Sat	Shri Ganganagar Junction	09:55 AM	Sun, Tue, Wed, Sat
22982	SGNR	Shri Ganganagar Junction	17:40 PM	Sun, Mon, Thu, Fri	Kota Junction	09:55 AM	Mon, Tue, Fri, Sat

== Direction reversal ==
The train reverses its direction at:

- Sawai Madhopur Junction
- Hanumangarh Junction

== Rake sharing ==
The train shares its rake with 22997/22998 Jhalawar City - Shri Ganganagar Superfast Express.

== Traction ==
Both trains are hauled by a Bhagat Ki Kothi Diesel Loco Shed based WDP-4B diesel locomotive from Shri Ganganagar to Kota and vice versa.

== See also ==
- Shri Ganganagar Junction railway station
- Kota Junction railway station
