= Kacheguda–Sri Ganganagar Express =

Train in India

Kacheguda - Sri Ganganagar Express

Overview
- Service type: Express
- Status: Active
- Locale: Telangana, Maharashtra, Madhya Pradesh and Rajasthan
- First service: 14 July 2026; 12 days ago
- Current operator: South Central Railway (SCR)

Route
- Termini: Kacheguda (KCG); Sri Ganganagar Junction (SGNR)
- Stops: 5
- Distance travelled: 2,172 km (1,350 mi)
- Average journey time: 47h 20m
- Service frequency: Weekly
- Train number: 17601 / 17602

On-board services
- Classes: General Unreserved, Sleeper Class, AC 3rd Class, AC 2nd Class, AC 1st Class
- Seating arrangements: Yes
- Sleeping arrangements: Yes
- Catering facilities: Pantry Car
- Observation facilities: Large windows
- Baggage facilities: No
- Other facilities: Below the seats

Technical
- Rolling stock: LHB coach
- Track gauge: 1,676 mm (5 ft 6 in)
- Electrification: 25 kV 50 Hz AC Overhead line
- Operating speed: 130 km/h (81 mph) maximum, 46 km/h (29 mph) average including halts.
- Track owner: Indian Railways
Route map
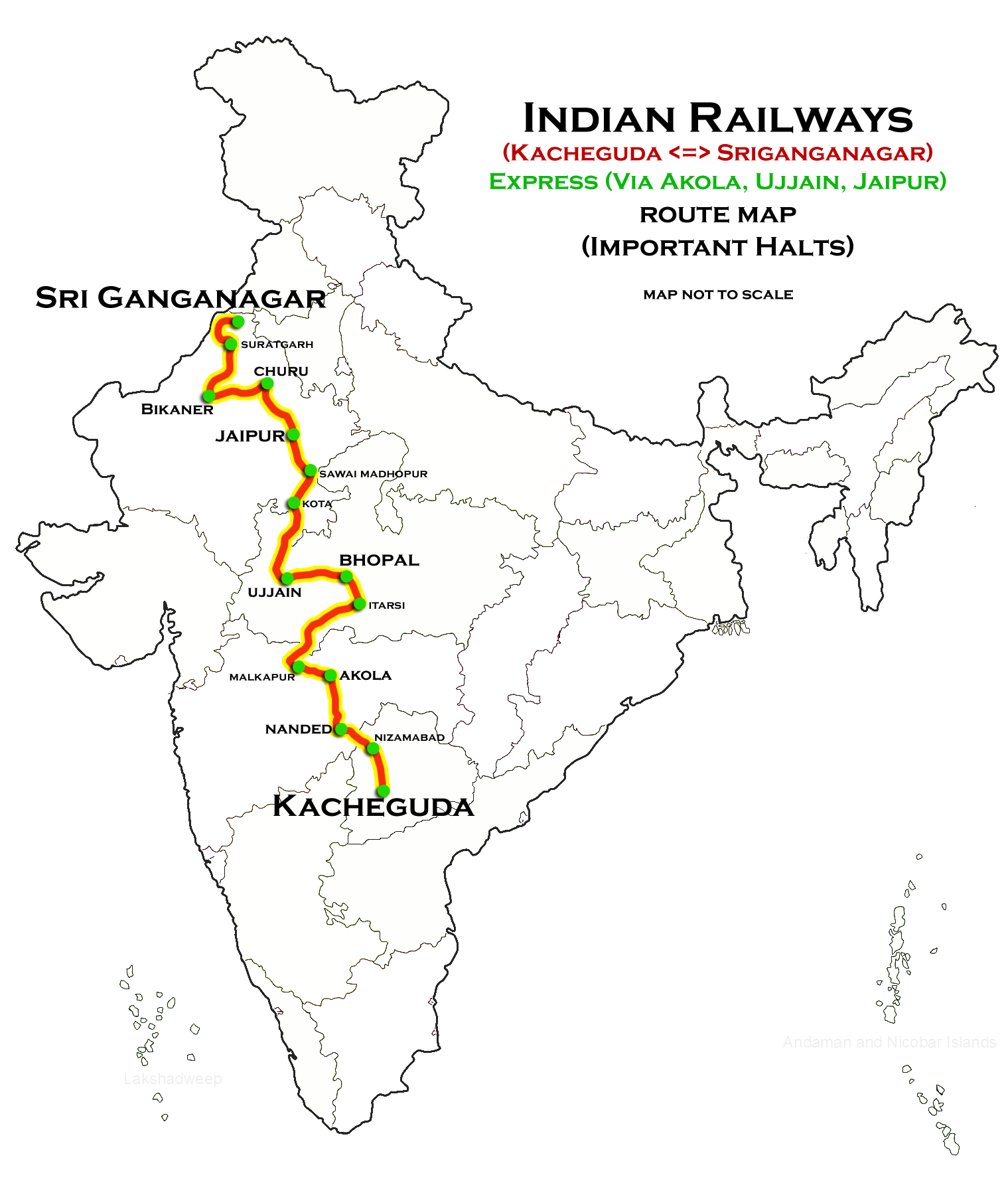

The 17601 / 17602 Kacheguda–Sri Ganganagar Express is an express train belonging to South Central Railway zone that runs between the city Kacheguda of Telangana and Sri Ganganagar Junction of Rajasthan in India.

It operates as train number 17601 from Kacheguda to Sri Ganganagar Junction and as train number 17602 in the reverse direction, serving the states of Rajasthan, Madhya Pradesh, Maharashtra and Telangana.

== Services ==
• 17601/ Kacheguda–Sri Ganganagar Express has an average speed of 46 km/h and covers 2172 km in 47h 20m.

• 17602/ Sri Ganganagar–Kacheguda Express has an average speed of 45 km/h and covers 2172 km in 48h 30m.

== Route and halts ==
The important halts of the train are :

- Kacheguda
- Akola Junction
- Nagda Junction
- Sawai Madhopur Junction
- Sri Ganganagar Junction

== Schedule ==
• 17601 – 10:00 pm (Saturday) [Kacheguda]

• 17602 – 6:45 am (Wednesday) [Sri Ganganagar Junction]

== Coach composition ==
1. General Unreserved – 4
2. Sleeper Class – 6
3. AC 3rd Class – 7
4. AC 2nd Class – 2
5. AC 1st Class – 1

== Traction ==
As the entire route is fully electrified, it is hauled by a Kazipet Shed-based WAP-7 electric locomotive from Kacheguda to Sri Ganganagar Junction and vice versa.

== Rake reversal or rake share ==
The train will Rake reversal with as follows :

1. Nagda Junction
2. Sawai Madhopur Junction.

== See also ==
Trains from Kacheguda :

1. Ajanta Express
2. Kacheguda–Chengalpattu Express
3. Kacheguda–Narkhed Intercity Express
4. Yesvantpur–Kacheguda Express
5. Kacheguda–Nagercoil Weekly Express

Trains from Sri Ganganagar Junction :

1. Thiruvananthapuram North–Shri Ganganagar Junction Express
2. Sri Ganganagar–Tiruchirappalli Humsafar Express
3. Shri Ganganagar–Dadar Superfast Express
4. Shri Ganganagar–Jammu Tawi Express
5. Amrapur Aravali Express

== Notes ==
a. Runs one day in a week with both directions.
