= Abohar–Jodhpur–Bathinda Express =

Train in India

Abohar-Jodhpur-Bathinda Passenger
Overview
- Service type: Express
- Locale: Punjab, Rajasthan
- Current operator: North Western Railway zone

Route
- Termini: Abohar Junction (ABS); Jodhpur Junction (JU), Bathinda Junction (BTI)
- Stops: 21 as 14721, 25 as 14722
- Distance travelled: 600 km (370 mi) as 14721, 673 km (418 mi) as 14722
- Average journey time: 14 hours 10 minutes as 14721, 15 hours as 14722
- Service frequency: Daily
- Train number: 14721/14722

On-board services
- Classes: Second Class sitting, AC 3 Tier, Sleeper 3 Tier, Unreserved
- Seating arrangements: No
- Sleeping arrangements: Yes
- Catering facilities: E-catering
- Observation facilities: No
- Entertainment facilities: No

Technical
- Rolling stock: LHB coaches
- Track gauge: 1,676 mm (5 ft 6 in)
- Operating speed: 42 km/h (26 mph) as 14721, 45 km/h (28 mph)

Abohar–Jodhpur–Bathinda Express is an express train from the Indian Railways connecting Abohar Junction in Punjab to Jodhpur Junction of Rajasthan. While returning from Jodhpur Junction the train terminates to Bathinda Junction. It is currently being operated with 14721/14722 train numbers on a daily basis.

== Service ==
The 14721 JodhpurJunction-Bathinda Junction Express has an average speed of 42 km/h and covers 600 km in 14 hours 10 minutes. The 14722 Abohar Junction-Jodhpur Junction Passenger has an average speed of 45 km/h and 673 km in 15 hours.

== Route and halts ==
- Abohar Junction
- Bathinda Junction
- Mandi Dabwali
- Hanumangarh Junction
- Suratgarh Junction
- Lalgarh Junction
- Bikaner Junction
- Nagaur
- Merta Road Junction
- Raikabag Palace Junction
- Jodhpur Junction

== Coach composition ==
The train consists of 11 coaches:

- 2 Sleeper Coaches
- 6 General Coaches
- 2 Second-class Luggage/parcel vans
- 1 Luggage carrying Coach

== Traction ==
Both trains are hauled by an Abu Road-based WDM-3A locomotive from Abohar Junction to Jodhpur Junction and Jodhpur Junction to Bathinda Junction.
