= Malkapur railway station =

Railway Station in Maharashtra, India

Malkapur

General information
- Location: SH 176, Malkapur, Buldhana district, Maharashtra; India
- Coordinates: 20°53′32″N 76°12′12″E
- Elevation: 252 metres (827 ft)
- System: Indian Railways station
- Owner: Indian Railways
- Operator: Central Railway
- Lines: Nagpur–Bhusawal section, Howrah–Nagpur–Mumbai line
- Platforms: 2

Construction
- Structure type: Standard, at ground
- Parking: Available

Other information
- Status: Active
- Station code: MKU
- Division(s): Bhusawal

History
- Opened: 1867
- Electrified: 1988–89
Location
- Location within Maharashtra

Malkapur railway station (MKU) is in Malkapur, a town in the Buldhana district of Maharashtra, India. There are many trains going through Malkapur railway station.

This railway is one of 44 railway stations of Maharashtra to be Redeveloping among through Prime Minister of India Narendra Modi's Dream Project Amrit Bharat Station Scheme

== History ==
The first train in India travelled from Mumbai to Thane on 16 April 1853. By May 1854, Great Indian Peninsula Railway's Bombay–Thane line was extended to Kalyan. Bhusawal railway station was set up in 1860 and in 1867 the GIPR branch line was extended to Nagpur.It is important station on Bhusawal-Nagpur section.

=== Electrification ===
The railways in the section were electrified in 1988–89.

== Amenities ==
Amenities at Malkapur railway station include: retiring room, waiting room, light refreshment stall, and book stall.Renovation of station is proposed, soon Malkapur Solapur line will be develop to improve connectivity

Important trains passing from station is:-

- Pune–Nagpur Garib Rath Express
- Hazur Sahib Nanded–Jammu Tawi Humsafar Express
- Navjeevan Express
- Gitanjali Express
- Amravati–Mumbai CSMT Superfast Express
- Secunderabad–Hisar Express
- Hazur Sahib Nanded–Shri Ganganagar Weekly Express
- Jaipur–Hyderabad SF Express
- Hazur Sahib Nanded–Shri Ganganagar Superfast Express via Hanumangarh
- Howrah–Mumbai CSMT Mail (via Nagpur)
- Vidarbha Superfast Express
- Prerana Express
- Puri–Ahmedabad Express
- Maharashtra Express
- Howrah–Ahmedabad Superfast Express
- Gandhidham–Puri Weekly Express
- Malda Town–Surat Express
- Gandhidham–Vishakhapatnam Weekly Express
- Kolkata–Lokmanya Tilak Terminus Kurla Express
- Ajmer–Puri Express
- Madgaon-Nagpur Express
