= Ambala Cantonment–Shri Ganganagar Intercity Express =

Train in India

Ambala Cantonment-Shri Ganganagar Intercity Express
Overview
- Service type: Express
- Locale: Haryana, Punjab & Rajasthan
- Current operator(s): Northern Railway

Route
- Termini: Ambala Cantonment Junction (UMB); Shri Ganganagar Junction (SGNR)
- Stops: 12
- Distance travelled: 328 km (204 mi)
- Average journey time: 6 hours 50 minutes
- Service frequency: Daily
- Train number(s): 14525 / 14526

On-board services
- Class(es): AC Chair Car, General Unreserved, Chair Car
- Seating arrangements: Yes
- Sleeping arrangements: No
- Auto-rack arrangements: Overhead racks
- Catering facilities: No
- Observation facilities: Large windows
- Baggage facilities: No
- Other facilities: Below the seats

Technical
- Rolling stock: ICF coach
- Track gauge: 1,676 mm (5 ft 6 in)
- Operating speed: 48 km/h (30 mph) average including halts.

The 14525 / 14526 Ambala Cantonment-Shri Ganganagar Intercity Express is an express train belonging to Indian Railways Northern Railway zone that runs between Ambala Cantonment Junction and Shri Ganganagar Junction in India.

It operates as train number 14525 from Ambala Cantonment Junction to Shri Ganganagar Junction and as train number 14526 in the reverse direction serving the states of Haryana, Punjab & Rajasthan.

== Coaches ==
The 14525 / 26 Ambala Cantonment Junction - Shri Ganganagar Intercity Express has one AC Chair Car, four chair car, three general unreserved & two SLR (seating with luggage rake) coaches . It does not carry a pantry car coach.

As is customary with most train services in India, coach composition may be amended at the discretion of Indian Railways depending on demand.

== Service ==
The 14525 Ambala Cantonment Junction - Shri Ganganagar Junction Intercity Express covers the distance of 328 km (204 mi) in 6 hours 45 mins (49 km/h) and in 6 hours 55 mins as the 14526 Shri Ganganagar Junction - Ambala Cantonment Junction Intercity Express (47 km/h).

As the average speed of the train is less than 55 km/h (34 mph), as per railway rules, its fare doesn't includes a Superfast surcharge.

== Routing ==
The 14525 / 26 Ambala Cantonment Junction - Shri Ganganagar Intercity Express runs from Ambala Cantonment Junction via Rajpura Junction, Dhuri, Bathinda Junction to Shri Ganganagar Junction.

== Traction ==
As the route is going to be electrified, a Tughlakabad Loco Shed-based WDM-3A diesel locomotive pulls the train to its destination.
