= Hazur Sahib Nanded–Shri Ganganagar Superfast Express via Hanumangarh =

Superfast train in India

Hazur Sahib Nanded – Shri Ganganagar Superfast Express via Hanumangarh
Overview
- Service type: Superfast
- First service: 31 May 2019
- Current operator: North Western Railways

Route
- Termini: Hazur Sahib Nanded; Shri Ganganagar Junction
- Stops: 26
- Distance travelled: 1,993 km (1,238 mi)
- Average journey time: 35 hours 18 mins
- Service frequency: Weekly
- Train number: 12439 / 12440

On-board services
- Classes: AC 1st Class, AC 2 tier, AC 3 tier, Sleeper, General
- Sleeping arrangements: Yes
- Catering facilities: No Pantry Car Coach attached

Technical
- Rolling stock: LHB coach
- Track gauge: 1,676 mm (5 ft 6 in)
- Operating speed: 140 km/h (87 mph) maximum,57 km/h (35 mph), including halts

Hazur Sahib Nanded Shri Ganganagar Junction Express is a Superfast train belonging to Indian Railways North Western Railway zone that run between Hazur Sahib Nanded and Shri Ganganagar Junction in India.

This train was Inaugurated on 31 May 2019 for better connectivity between these two places.

== Service ==
This train covers the distance of 1993 km with an average speed of 57 km/h on both sides with total time of 35 hours 18 mins.

As the average speed of the train is above 55 km/h, as per Indian Railways rules, its fare includes a Superfast surcharge.

== Routes ==
This train passes through Purna Junction, Akola Junction, Khandwa Junction, New Delhi, Bathinda Junction and Hanumangarh Junction on both sides. It reverses direction at twice during its run at Purna Junction and Bathinda Junction.

== Traction ==
As this route is fully electrified the WAP-5 pulls it from Hazur Sahib Nanded to Shri Ganganagar and vice-versa.
