= Shri Ganganagar–Jammu Tawi Express =

Train in India

Overview
- Service type: Express
- First service: 24 September 2014; 11 years ago
- Current operator: North Western Railway

Route
- Termini: Shri Ganganagar Junction (SGNR); Jammu Tawi (JAT)
- Stops: 12
- Distance travelled: 548 km (341 mi)
- Average journey time: 11 hrs 50 mins
- Service frequency: Weekly. (Note: Runs one day in a week for every direction.)
- Train number: 14713 / 14714

On-board services
- Classes: AC 2 Tier, AC 3 Tier, Sleeper Class, General Unreserved
- Seating arrangements: No
- Sleeping arrangements: Yes
- Catering facilities: On-board catering, E-catering
- Observation facilities: Large windows
- Baggage facilities: No
- Other facilities: Below the seats

Technical
- Rolling stock: LHB coach
- Track gauge: 1,676 mm (5 ft 6 in)
- Operating speed: 55 km/h (34 mph) average including halts.

The 14713 / 14714 Shri Ganganagar–Jammu Tawi Express is an express train belonging to North Western Railway zone that runs between Shri Ganganagar Junction and Jammu Tawi in India. It is currently being operated with 14713/14714 train numbers on a weekly basis.

== Service ==
The 14713/Shri Ganganagar–Jammu Tawi Express has an average speed of 46 km/h and covers 548 km in 11h 50m. The 14714/Jammu Tawi–Shri Ganganagar Express has an average speed of 43 km/h and covers 548 km in 12h 50m.

== Route and halts ==
The important halts of the train are:

- Shri Ganganagar Junction
- Abohar Junction
- Bathinda Junction
- Barnala
- Dhuri Junction
- Ludhiana Junction
- Jalandhar Cantonment Junction
- Pathankot Cantonment
- Kathua
- Jammu Tawi

== Coach composition ==
The train has standard ICF rakes with max speed of 110 kmph. The train consists of 20 coaches:

- 2 AC II Tier
- 4 AC III Tier
- 7 Sleeper coaches
- 6 General Unreserved
- 2 Seating cum Luggage Rake

== Traction ==
Both trains are hauled by a Tughlakabad Loco Shed-based WDM-3A diesel locomotive from Shri Ganganagar to Jammu Tawi and vice versa.

== Direction reversal ==
The train reverses its direction once:

- Dhuri Junction

== Rake sharing ==
The train shares its rake with 12485/12486 Hazur Sahib Nanded–Shri Ganganagar Express

== See also ==
- Shri Ganganagar Junction railway station
- Jammu Tawi railway station
- Hazur Sahib Nanded–Shri Ganganagar Express
