= Hazur Sahib Nanded–Santragachi Express =

Train in India

Hazur Sahib Nanded Santragachi Junction Express
Overview
- Service type: Express
- First service: 27 February 2012; 13 years ago
- Current operator: South Central Railway zone

Route
- Termini: Hazur Sahib Nanded; Santragachi Junction
- Stops: 26
- Distance travelled: 1,571 km (976 mi)
- Average journey time: 28 hours
- Service frequency: Weekly
- Train number: 12767 / 12768

On-board services
- Classes: AC 3 Tier, Sleeper class & General Unreserved
- Seating arrangements: Yes
- Sleeping arrangements: Yes
- Catering facilities: No
- Observation facilities: Rake sharing with 17621 / 17622 Aurangabad–Renigunta Express & 17619 / 17620 Aurangabad–Hazur Sahib Nanded Express

Technical
- Rolling stock: Standard Indian Railways coaches
- Track gauge: 1,676 mm (5 ft 6 in)
- Operating speed: 56 km/h (35 mph)
Route map
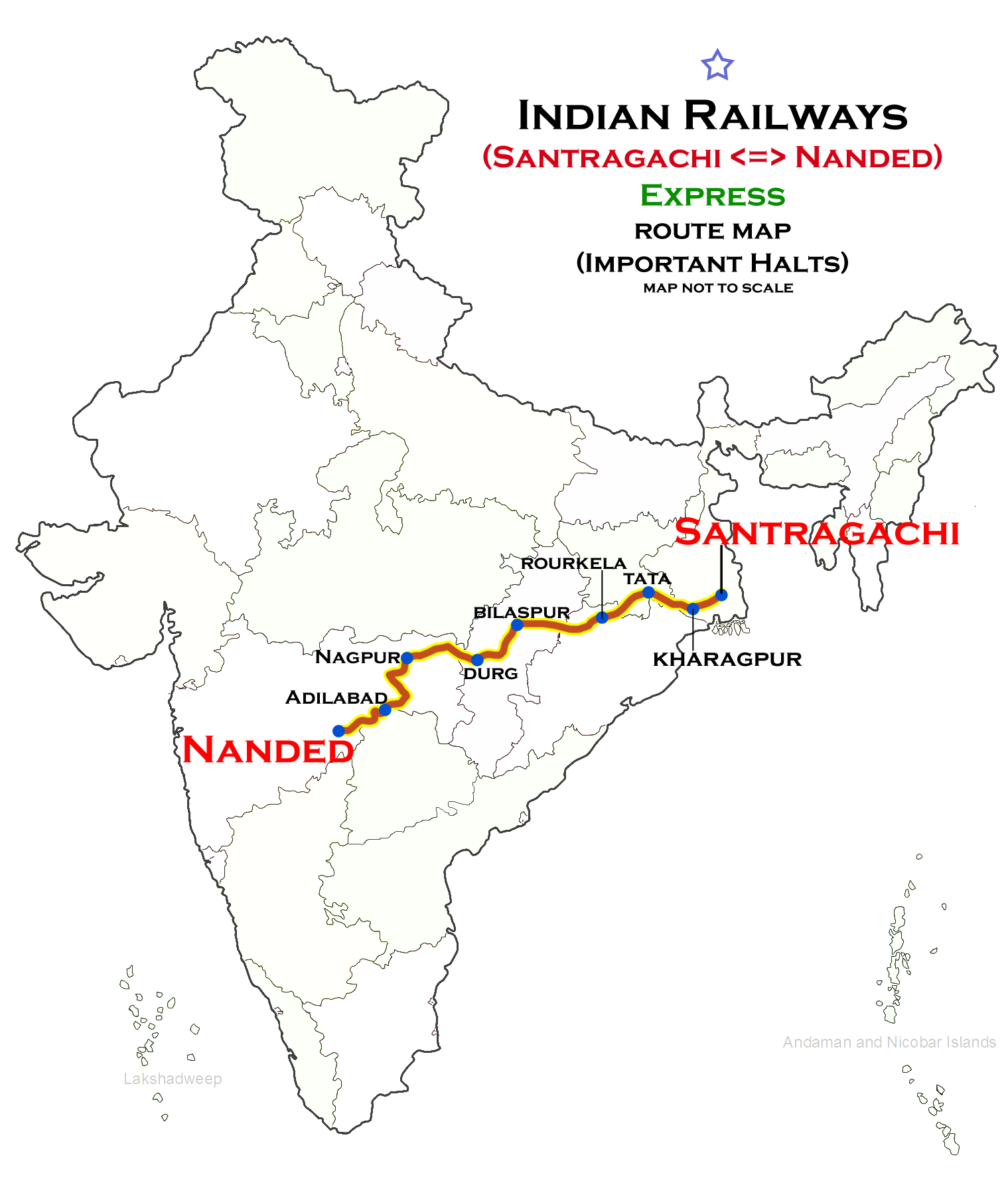

12767 / 68 Hazur Sahib Nanded Santragachi Junction Express is an Express train belonging to Indian Railways South Central Railway zone that runs between Hazur Sahib Nanded and Santragachi Junction in India.

== Service ==
It operates as train number 12767 from Hazur Sahib Nanded to Santragachi Junction and as train number 12768 in the reverse direction, serving the states of Maharashtra, Telangana, Chhattisgarh, Odisha, Jharkhand & West Bengal. The train covers the distance of 1,571 km (976 mi) in 28 hours approximately at a speed of 56 km/h (35 mph).

== Schedule ==
Train number	Station code	Departure station	Departure time	Departure day	Arrival station	Arrival time	Arrival day
12767	NED	Hazur Sahib Nanded	3:15 PM	Monday	Santragachi	7:15 PM	Tuesday
12768	SRC	Santragachi	2:50 PM	Wednesday	Hazur Sahib Nanded	6:22 PM	Thursday

== Rake sharing ==
- 17620/17619 – Aurangabad–Hazur Sahib Nanded Express
- 17621/17622 – Aurangabad–Renigunta Express

== Coaches ==
The 12767 / 68 Hazur Sahib Nanded–Santragachi Junction Express has one AC 3-tier, six sleeper class, six general unreserved & two SLR (seating with luggage rake) coaches. It doesn't carry a pantry car.

As with most train services in India, coach composition may be amended at the discretion of Indian Railways depending on demand.

== Routing ==
The 12767 / 68 Hazur Sahib Nanded Santragachi Junction Express runs from Hazur Sahib Nanded via Mudkhed, Adilabad, Majri Junction, Nagpur Junction, Bilaspur Junction, Rourkela Junction, Tatanagar Junction, Kharagpur Junction to Santragachi Junction.

== Traction ==
As this route is fully electrified, a Santragachi Junction-based electric WAP-4 pulls the train up to its destination and vice-versa .
