= Delhi–Sri Ganganagar Intercity Express =

Delhi – Sri Ganganagar Intercity Express
Overview
- Service type: Express
- Current operator: Northern Railway zone

Route
- Termini: Delhi Junction (DLI); Shri Ganganagar Junction (SGNR)
- Stops: 13
- Distance travelled: 423 km (263 mi)
- Average journey time: 7 hours 30
- Service frequency: Daily (Note: Runs seven days in a week for every direction.)
- Train number: 12481/12482

On-board services
- Classes: AC 2 tier, AC 3 tier, Sleeper Class, General Unreserved
- Seating arrangements: Yes
- Sleeping arrangements: Yes
- Catering facilities: Yes
- Observation facilities: Rake sharing with 14731 / 14732 [[[Kisan Express|– Bathinda Kisan Express]]]

Technical
- Rolling stock: LHB coach
- Track gauge: 1,676 mm (5 ft 6 in)
- Operating speed: 55.5 km/h (34 mph), including halts

The Delhi – Sri Ganganagar Intercity Express is an Express express train belonging to North Western Railway zone that runs between Delhi Junction and Sri Ganganagar in India.

It operates as train number 12482 from Delhi Junction to Sri Ganganagar and as train number 12481 in the reverse direction serving the states of Rajasthan, Punjab, Haryana and Delhi.

== Service ==
The 12481/Delhi – Sriganganagar InterCity Express has an average speed of 56 km/h and covers 423 km in 7 hrs 30 mins. 12482/Sriganganagar – Delhi InterCity Express has an average speed of 55 km/h and covers 403 kilometres (250 mi) in 7 hrs 40 mins.

== Route and halts ==
The important halts of the train are:

- Delhi
- Shakur Basti
- Rohtak Junction
- Jind Junction
- Jakhal Junction
- Bathinda Junction
- Abohar Junction
- Shri Ganganagar Junction

== Coach composite ==
The train has modern LHB rakes with maximum speed of 110 km/h. The train consists of 17 coaches :

- Sleeper (1 coach)
- 3 AC Economy (2 coach)
- AC chair car (1 coach)
- Non ac chair
- 2 General
- 2 Second-class Luggage/parcel van

== Traction ==
Both trains are hauled by a [[Loco Shed, Ludhiana[Ludhiana Loco Shed]] based WDM-3A (WDP-4B)diesel locomotive from Bathinda to [[Shri Ganganagar]] and vice versa, and electric locomotive /WAP7/WAP5/WAP4] from Bathinda to Delhi and vice versa.

== See also ==
- Delhi railway station
- Shri Ganganagar Junction railway station
- Haridwar – Shri Ganganagar Intercity Express
- Delhi – Fazilka Intercity Express
