= Kacheguda–Tiruchanur Express =

Train in India

Kacheguda - Tiruchanur Express

Overview
- Service type: Express
- Status: Active
- Locale: Telangana and Andhra Pradesh
- First service: 15 May 2026; 2 days' time
- Current operator: South Central Railway (SCR)

Route
- Termini: Kacheguda (KCG); Tiruchanur (TCNR)
- Stops: 2
- Distance travelled: 630 km (391 mi)
- Average journey time: 15h 0m
- Service frequency: Weekly
- Train number: 17607 / 17608

On-board services
- Classes: General Unreserved, Sleeper Class, AC 3rd Class, AC 2nd Class
- Seating arrangements: Yes
- Sleeping arrangements: Yes
- Catering facilities: Pantry Car
- Observation facilities: Large windows
- Baggage facilities: No
- Other facilities: Below the seats

Technical
- Rolling stock: ICF coach
- Track gauge: 1,676 mm (5 ft 6 in)
- Electrification: 25 kV 50 Hz AC Overhead line
- Operating speed: 130 km/h (81 mph) maximum, 42 km/h (26 mph) average including halts.
- Track owner: Indian Railways
Route map
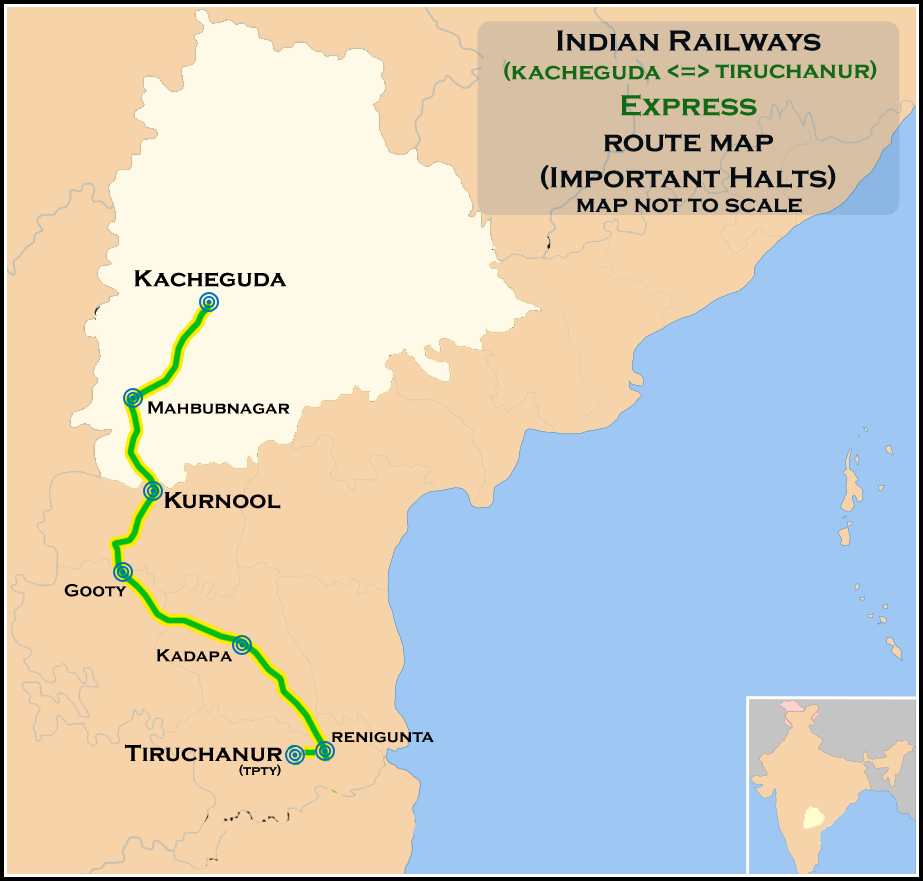

The 17607 / 17608 Kacheguda–Tiruchanur Express is an express train belonging to South Central Railway zone that runs between the city Kacheguda of Telangana and Tiruchanur of Andhra Pradesh in India.

It operates as train number 17607 from Kacheguda to Tiruchanur and as train number 17608 in the reverse direction, serving the states of Andhra Pradesh and Telangana.

== Services ==
• 17607/ Kacheguda–Tiruchanur Express has an average speed of 42 km/h and covers 630 km in 15h 0m.

• 17608/ Tiruchanur–Kacheguda Express has an average speed of 37 km/h and covers 630 km in 17h 0m.

== Route and halts ==
The important halts of the train are :

- Kacheguda
- Tiruchanur

== Schedule ==
• 17607 – 9:30 pm (Thursday) [Kacheguda]

• 17608 – 4:00 pm (Thursday) [Tiruchanur]

== Coach composition ==
1. General Unreserved – 4
2. Sleeper Class – 14
3. AC 3rd Class – 3
4. AC 2nd Class – 2

== Traction ==
As the entire route is fully electrified, it is hauled by a Royapuram Shed-based WAP-7 electric locomotive from Kacheguda to Tiruchanur and vice versa.

== Rake reversal or rake share ==
The train will Rake Sharing with as follows :

1. Kacheguda–Sri Ganganagar Express (17601/17602)

== See also ==
Trains from Kacheguda :

1. Kacheguda–Yesvantpur Vande Bharat Express
2. Murdeshwar–Kacheguda Superfast Express
3. Kacheguda–Bhagat Ki Kothi Express
4. Venkatadri Express
5. Kacheguda–Madurai Weekly Express

Trains from Tiruchanur :

1. Charlapalli–Tiruchanur Express (via Warangal)
2. Charlapalli–Tiruchanur Express (via Kurnool City)

== Notes ==
a. Runs one day in a week with both directions.
