= Khandwa Junction railway station =

Railway station in Madhya Pradesh

Khandwa Junction
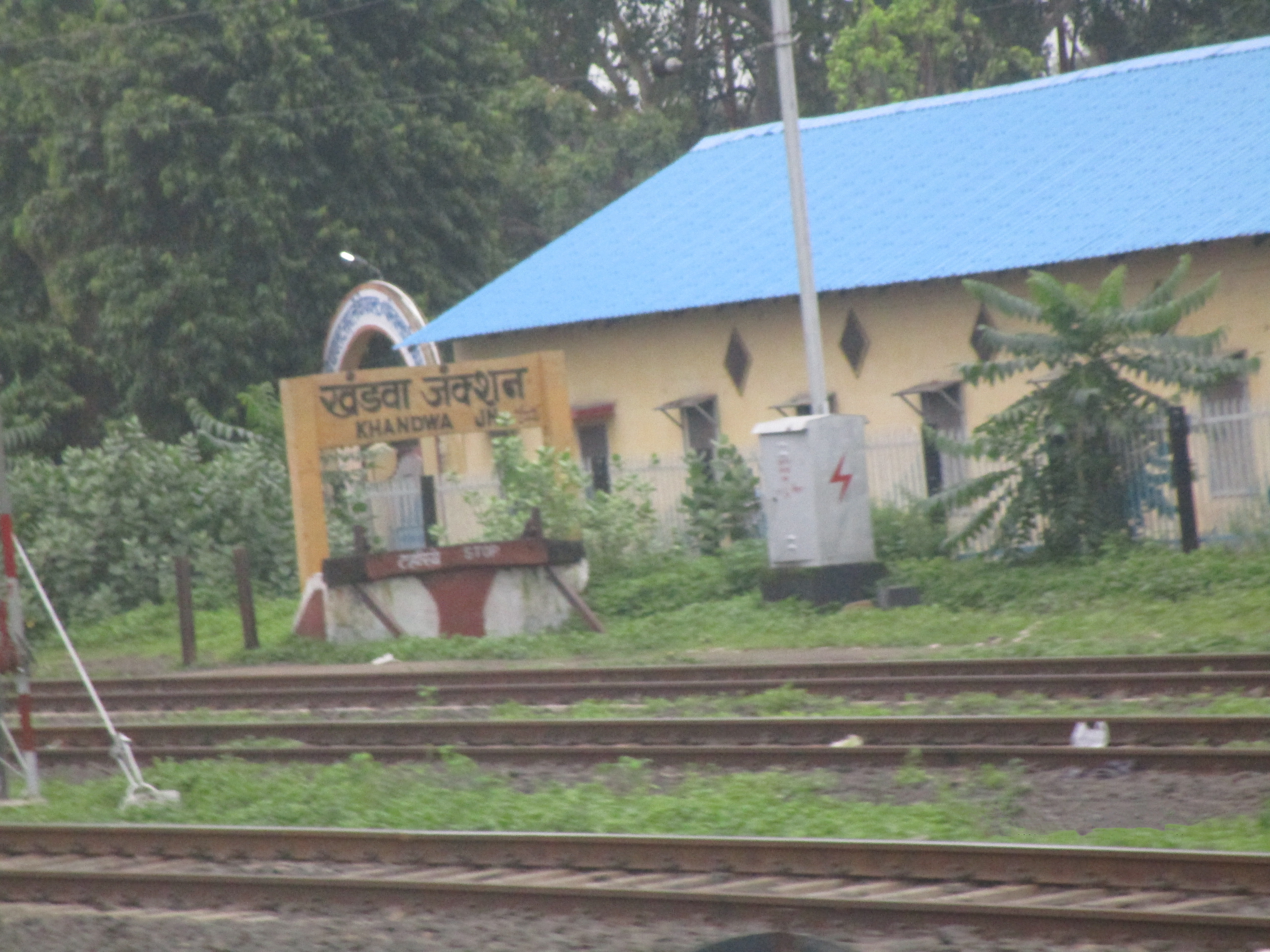
- Khandwa Junction railway station

General information
- Location: Khandwa, Khandwa district, Madhya Pradesh; India
- Coordinates: 21°49′26″N 76°21′11″E
- Elevation: 310 metres (1,020 ft)
- System: Indian Railways station
- Owner: Indian Railways
- Lines: Howrah–Prayagraj–Mumbai line, Jabalpur–Bhusaval section, Akola–Ratlam line
- Platforms: 6 Platforms.
- Tracks: 12

Construction
- Parking: Yes
- Cycle facilities: No

Other information
- Status: Functioning
- Station code: KNW
- Zone(s): Central Railway
- Division(s): Bhusawal

History
- Opened: 1866; 160 years ago
- Electrified: 1991–92

Services
Preceding station	Indian Railways	Following station
Mathela towards ?	Western Railway zone Howrah–Allahabad–Mumbai line	Bargaon Gujar towards ?
Mordar towards ?	Western Railway zone Akola–Ratlam line	Ajanti towards ?
Location
- Interactive map

Khandwa Junction is on the Jabalpur–Bhusaval section of Howrah–Prayagraj–Mumbai line. It lies in Khandwa district in the Indian state of Madhya Pradesh.

== History ==
The Great Indian Peninsula Railway opened Bhusawal–Khandwa section in 1866.

== Electrification ==
The Harda–Khandwa–Bhusaval sector was electrified in 1997–98.

== Halting trains ==
These are the trains that runs from Khandwa Junction are:

- Nanded Amritsar Sachkhand Express
- Kacheguda–Bhagat Ki Kothi Express
- Kolkata Mail
- Mangala Lakshadweep Express
- Pune–Danapur Superfast Express
- Punjab Mail
- Karnataka Express
- Lashkar Express
- Bhagalpur–Lokmanya Tilak Terminus Superfast Express
- Jhelum Express
- Mumbai CST–Amritsar Express
- Mahanagari Express
- Hisar-Hyderabad Weekly Express
- Ajmer–Hyderabad Meenakshi Express
- Hyderabad-Jaipur Weekly Express
- Kacheguda–Sri Ganganagar Express
- Hazur Sahib Nanded-Tanakpur Express
- Firozpur Cantt. - Hazur Sahib Nanded Weekly Express
- Ahmedabad Barauni Express
- Surat Chhapra Tapti Ganga Express
- Mumbai LTT Ranchi Express
- Hubballi Banaras Express
- Mumbai LTT Guwahati Express
- Mumbai LTT Dibrugarh Express
- Bandra Gorakhpur Weekly Express
- Panvel Gorakhpur Express
- Pune Gorakhpur Express via Lucknow
- Mumbai Gorakhpur Kashi Express
- Mumbai LTT Bareilly Express
- Pune Lucknow Express
- Mumbai LTT Gorakhpur Express via Varanasi
- Mumbai LTT Gorakhpur Express via Barhni
- Mumbai LTT Ballia Kamyani Express
- Mumbai LTT Jaynagar Pawan Express
- Mumbai Patna Janta Express
- Pune Gorakhpur Express via Prayagraj
- Pune Darbhanga Express
- Mumbai LTT Sultanpur Express
- Mumbai LTT Rani Kamlapati Express
- Kolhapur H. Nizamuddin Express
- Mysuru H. Nizamuddin Swarna Jayanti Express
- Pune Banaras Gyan Ganga Express
- Mumbai LTT Raxaul Karmabhumi Express
- Mumbai LTT Banaras Express
- Udhna Banaras Express
- Ahmedabad Prayagraj Express
- Mumbai Ayodhya Saket Express
- Rajkot Rewa Express
- Rewa Ekta Nagar Mahamana Express
- Goa Express
- Surat Bhagalpur Express
- Patna Vasco Da Gama Express
- Mumbai LTT Godda Express
- Mumbai Gorakhpur Kushinagar Express
- Mumbai Ayodhya Tulsi Express
- Pushpak Express
- Kalka Shirdi Express
- Mysuru Varanasi Express
- Nanded Shri Ganganagar Express via Abohar
- Nanded Shri Ganganagar Express via Hanumangarh
- Nanded Amritsar Express
- Nanded Amb Andaura Express
- Udhna Danapur Express
- Mumbai LTT Azamgarh Express
- Mumbai CSMT Asansol Express
- Mumbai Pratapgarh Udyogkarmi Express
- Jabalpur–Mumbai CSMT Garib Rath Express
- Lokmanya Tilak Terminus–Agartala AC Express
- Lokmanya Tilak Terminus–Haridwar AC Superfast Express
- Hazur Sahib Nanded–Jammu Tawi Humsafar Express
- Raxaul–Lokmanya Tilak Terminus Antyodaya Express
- Raxaul LTT Antyodaya Express via Patliputra
- Chhapra–Lokmanya Tilak Terminus Antyodaya Express
- Jaynagar–Udhna Antyodaya Express
- Banaras–Hadapsar (Pune) Amrit Bharat Express
- Pune-Danapur Amrit Bharat Express
- Mumbai LTT-Subedarganj Amrit Bharat Express
- Ordinary Category Passenger Train services run from Khandwa to Bir
- MEMU Passenger Services run from Khandwa to Sanawad
- Itarsi Bhusawal MEMU Express
- Bhusaval - Katni Express
- Coimbatore-Jabalpur Express
- Mumbai CSMT Rewa Express
- Pune-Jabalpur Express
