= Jhalawar City railway station =

Railway Station in Rajasthan, India

General information
- Location: NH12, Jhalawar, Rajasthan; India
- Coordinates: 24.5806°N 76.1467°E
- Elevation: 325 metres (1,066 ft)
- System: Indian Railways station
- Owner: Indian Railways
- Line: Kota–Jhalawar
- Platforms: 1
- Tracks: 3
- Connections: Auto stand

Construction
- Structure type: Standard (on-ground station)
- Parking: Yes
- Cycle facilities: Yes
- Accessible: Disabled access

Other information
- Status: Functioning
- Station code: JLWC
- Fare zone: West Central Railway
Location
- Location within India Location within Rajasthan

Jhalawar City railway station is a small railway station in Jhalawar, Rajasthan. Its code is JLWC. It serves Jhalawar city. The station consists of a single platform. The platform is not well sheltered. It lacks many facilities including water and sanitation.

== Important trains ==
- 05613/05614 Jhalawar City–Kota Passenger Special
- 59837/59837 Jhalawar City–Kota Passenger
- 59839/59840 Jhalawar City–Kota Passenger
- 22997/22998 Jhalawar City–Shri Ganganagar Superfast Express
