= Sachkhand Express =

Train in India

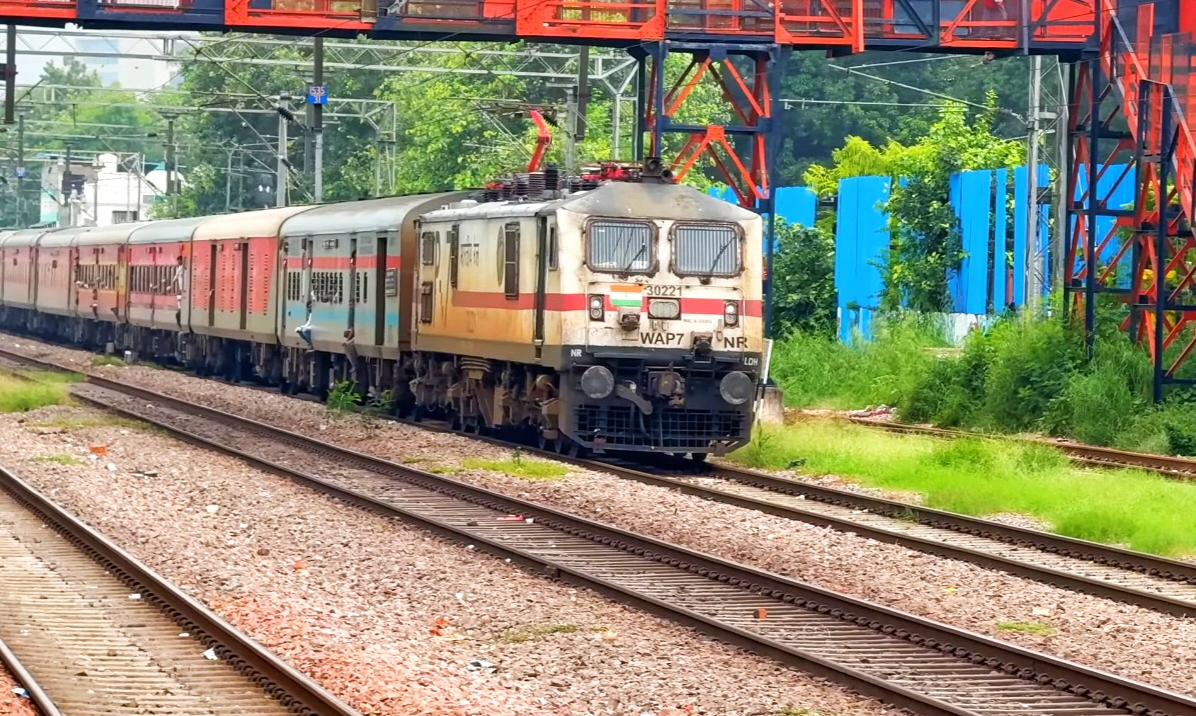
- Ludhiana WAP-7 hauling Sachkhand Express At New Delhi

Overview
- Service type: Superfast
- Locale: Maharashtra, Madhya Pradesh, Rajasthan, Uttar Pradesh, Haryana, Delhi & Punjab
- Current operator: South Central Railway

Route
- Termini: Hazur Sahib Nanded (NED); Amritsar Junction (ASR)
- Stops: 37
- Distance travelled: 2,082 km (1,294 mi)
- Average journey time: 34 hrs 25 mins
- Service frequency: Daily
- Train number: 12715 / 12716

On-board services
- Classes: AC 2 Tier, AC 3 Tier, Sleeper Class, General Unreserved
- Seating arrangements: Yes
- Sleeping arrangements: Yes
- Catering facilities: Available
- Observation facilities: Large windows
- Baggage facilities: Available
- Other facilities: Below the seats

Technical
- Rolling stock: LHB coach
- Track gauge: 1,676 mm (5 ft 6 in); Broad Gauge
- Operating speed: 60 km/h (37 mph) average including halts.
Route map
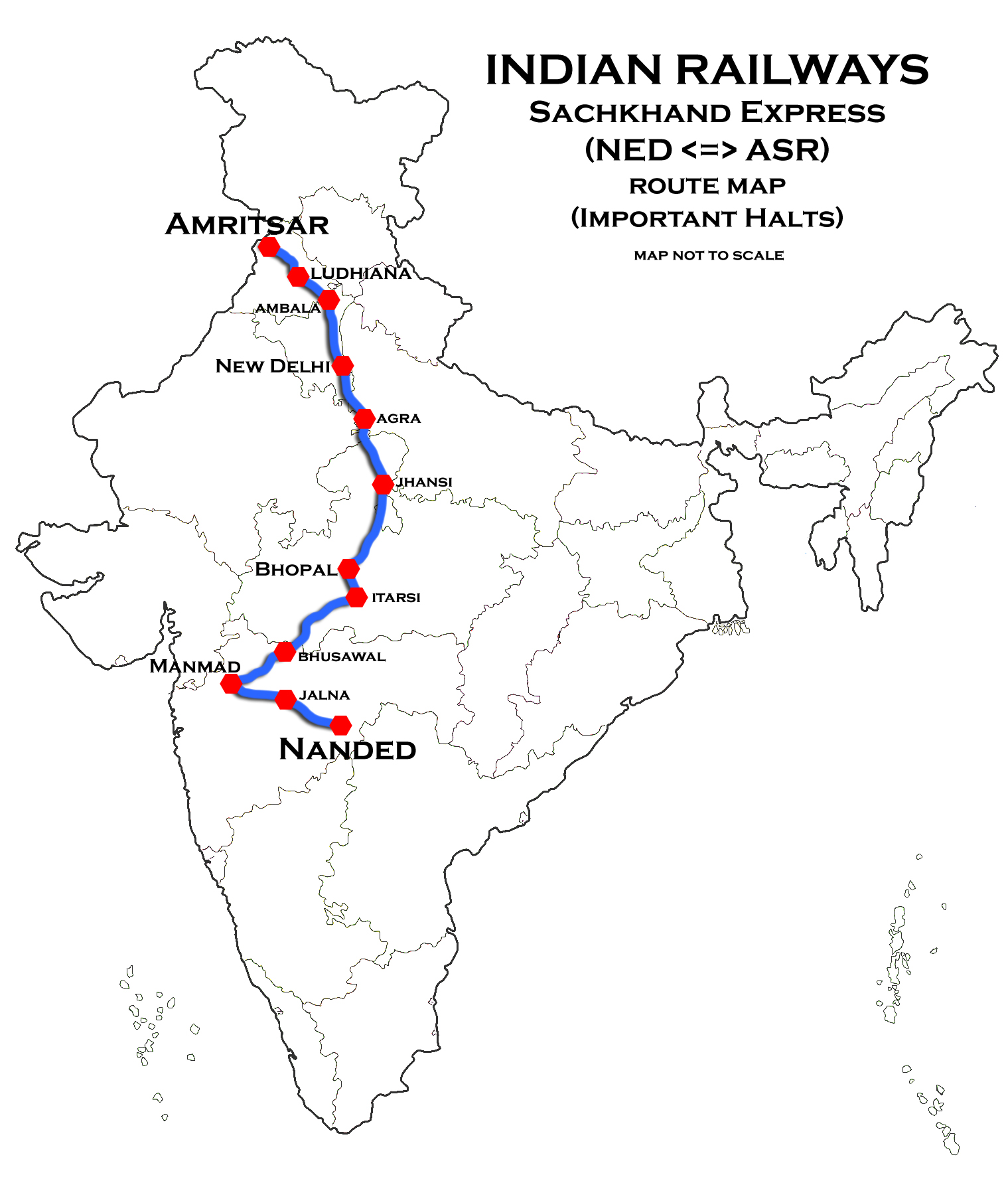
- Sachkhand Express (Amritsar–Nanded) route map

The 12715 / 12716 Sachkhand Express is superfast express train operated by Indian Railways on a daily basis between the cities of Huzur Sahib Nanded in Maharashtra to Amritsar in Punjab. This train links two famous Sikh shrines. The train is named after Sachkhand Sahib Gurudwara, situated in Nanded.

This train also links New Delhi, which is the capital of India, as well as the state capital of Madhya Pradesh, Bhopal to Nanded, Parbhani, Jalna and Aurangabad of the Marathwada Region of Maharashtra. This train during COVID-19 situation had change the train no. 02715/02716.

== Train numbers ==
- 12715 Hazur Sahib Nanded -Amritsar Junction Sachkhand Express.
- 12716 Amritsar Junction - Hazur Sahib Nanded Sachkhand Express.

== Route and halts ==
The train runs from Hazur Sahib Nanded via, Purna Junction, Parbhani Junction, Selu, Jalna, Chhatrapati Sambhajinagar, Manmad Junction, Chalisgaon Junction, Bhusaval Junction, Burhanpur, Khandwa Junction, Itarsi Junction, Bhopal Junction, Jhansi Junction, Gwalior Junction, Agra Cantonment, Mathura Junction, Hazrat Nizamuddin, New Delhi, Panipat Junction, Ambala Cantonment Junction, Sirhind, Rajpura Junction, Ludhiana Junction, Jalandhar City Junction, Beas Junction to Amritsar Junction.

The train makes stops at the same stations on its reverse journey, except for Hazrat Nizamuddin.

== Time-table ==
- 12715 Sachkhand Express leaves Hazur Sahib Nanded (NED) at 09:30 AM to reach its destination of Amritsar Junction (ASR) at 09:45PM next day.
- 12716 Sachkhand Express leaves Amritsar Junction (ASR) at 05:30AM and returns to Hazur Sahib Nanded (NED) at 02:35PM next day.

== Coach composition ==
There are 24 coaches, including 2 -SLR, 3-Second Class, 1-2AC, 5-3AC, 1-pantry, and remaining 12 -Sleeper coaches and 1 -HCP coach.

Train No. 12715 Sachkhand Express now runs with Linke Hofmann Busch (LHB) coaches as of September 27, 2018. One rake will be converted to LHB as of September 27, 2018, with revised CC, 12 Sleepers, 4 third ac, 1 2nd AC, PC and 2GS and 2EOG.

Rake position from H S Nanded,

LOCO-EOG-GS-A1-B1-B2-B3-B4-PC-S1-S2-S3-S4-S5-S6-S7-S8-S9-S10-S11-S12-GS-EOG

== Traction ==
As the route is fully electrified, it is hauled by a Ghaziabad Loco Shed or Ludhiana Loco Shed-based WAP-7 electric locomotive on its entire journey.

At the New Delhi Railway station, langar cooked from Veerji da Dera at Tilak Nagar in West Delhi is served in the train. People from Dera distribute the food to all pilgrimages returning from visiting the holy city of the tenth master.

== See also ==
- Devagiri Express
- Nanded
- Aurangabad
