= Aurangabad–Hazur Sahib Nanded Express =

Train in India

Aurangabad Hazur Sahib Nanded Express
Overview
- Service type: Express
- First service: 19 January 2015; 11 years ago
- Current operator: South Central Railway zone

Route
- Termini: Aurangabad; Hazur Sahib Nanded
- Stops: 6
- Distance travelled: 236 km (147 mi)
- Average journey time: 24 hours 7 mins
- Service frequency: Weekly
- Train number: 17619 / 17620

On-board services
- Classes: AC 3 Tier, Sleeper class & General Unreserved
- Seating arrangements: Yes
- Sleeping arrangements: Yes
- Catering facilities: No
- Observation facilities: Rake Sharing with 17621 / 17622 Aurangabad–Renigunta Express & 12767 / 12768 Hazur Sahib Nanded–Santragachi Express

Technical
- Rolling stock: Standard Indian Railways coaches
- Track gauge: 1,676 mm (5 ft 6 in)
- Operating speed: 42 km/h (26 mph)
Route map
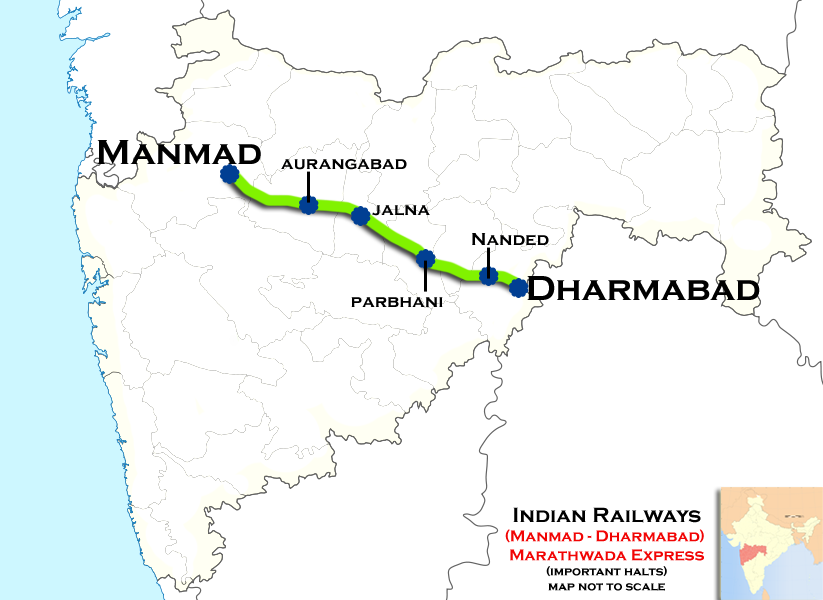

17619 / 20 Aurangabad Hazur Sahib Nanded Express is an Express train belonging to Indian Railways South Central Railway zone that runs between Aurangabad and Hazur Sahib Nanded in India.

== Service ==
It operates as train number 17619 from Aurangabad to Hazur Sahib Nanded and as train number 17620 in the reverse direction, serving the state of Maharashtra. The train covers the distance of 236 km (147 mi) in 5 hours 37 mins approximately at a speed of (42 km/h (26 mph)).

== Coaches ==
The 17619 / 20 Aurangabad–Hazur Sahib Nanded Express has one AC 3-tier, six sleeper class, six general unreserved & two SLR (seating with luggage rake) coaches. It doesn't carry a pantry car.

As with most train services in India, coach composition may be amended at the discretion of Indian Railways depending on demand.

== Rake sharing ==
12767 / 68 – Hazur Sahib Nanded–Santragachi Express

== Routeing ==
The 17619 / 20 Aurangabad–Hazur Sahib Nanded Express runs from Aurangabad via Jalna, Parbhani Junction, Purna Junction to Hazur Sahib Nanded.

== Traction ==
As this route is fully electrified, a Vijayawada-based electric WAP-4 pulls the train to its destination.
