= Aurangabad–Tirupati Weekly Express =

Train in India

Aurangabad Tirupati Express
Overview
- Service type: Express
- First service: 13 December 2014; 11 years ago
- Current operator: South Central Railway zone

Route
- Termini: Aurangabad; Renigunta Junction
- Stops: 24
- Distance travelled: 1,160 km (721 mi)
- Average journey time: 24 hours 7 mins
- Service frequency: Weekly
- Train number: 17621 / 17622

On-board services
- Classes: AC 3 Tier, Sleeper class & General Unreserved
- Seating arrangements: Yes
- Sleeping arrangements: Yes
- Catering facilities: No
- Observation facilities: Rake Sharing with 12767 / 12768 Hazur Sahib Nanded–Santragachi Express & 17619 / 17620 Aurangabad–Hazur Sahib Nanded Express

Technical
- Rolling stock: Standard Indian Railways coaches
- Track gauge: 1,676 mm (5 ft 6 in)
- Operating speed: 48 km/h (30 mph)
Route map
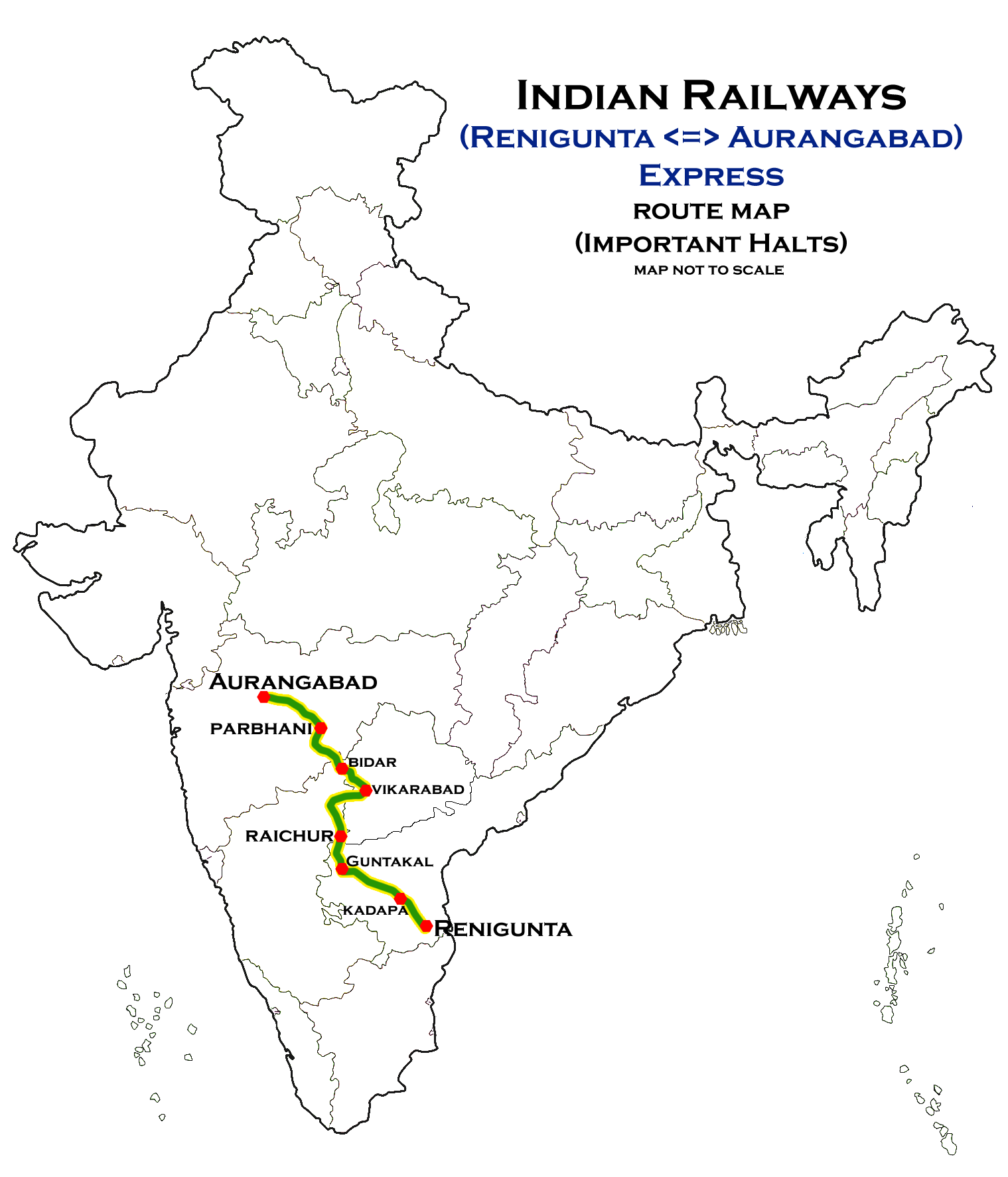

17621 / 22 Aurangabad–Tirupati Weekly Express is an Express train belonging to Indian Railways South Central Railway zone that run between Aurangabad and Renigunta Junction in India.

== Service ==
It operates as train number 17621 from Aurangabad to Tirupati and as train number 17622 in the reverse direction, serving the states of Maharashtra, Karnataka, Telangana & Andhra Pradesh. The train covers the distance of 1,160 km (720 mi) in 24 hours 7 mins approximately at a speed of (48 km/h (30 mph)).

== Schedule ==
Train number	Station code	Departure station	Departure time	Departure day	Arrival station	Arrival time	Arrival day
17621	AWB	Aurangabad	8:50 PM	Friday	Tirupati	8:05 PM	Saturday
17622	TPTY	Tirupati	9:45 PM	Saturday	Aurangabad	10:45 PM	Sunday

== Coaches ==
The 17621 / 22 Aurangabad–Tirupati Weekly Express has one AC 3-tier, six sleeper class, six general unreserved, and two SLR (seating with luggage rake) coaches. It doesn't carry a pantry car.

As with most train services in India, coach composition may be amended at the discretion of Indian Railways, depending on demand.

== Routeing ==
The 17621 / 22 Aurangabad Tirupati Weekly Express runs from Aurangabad via Jalna, Parbhani Junction, Parli Vaijnath, Latur Road junction, Vikarabad, Raichur, Guntakal Junction, Yerraguntla Junction, Cuddapah, Renigunta to Tirupati.

== Traction ==
As this route is fully electrified, an Arakkonam-based electric WAP-4 loco pulls the train from Aurangabad to Tirupati and vice versa.
