= Hazur Sahib Nanded–Shri Ganganagar Express =

Train in India

Hazur Sahib Nanded-Shri Ganganagar SF Express
Overview
- Service type: Superfast
- First service: 21 March 2010; 15 years ago
- Current operator(s): North Western Railways

Route
- Termini: Hazur Sahib Nanded (NED); Shri Ganganagar Junction (SGNR)
- Stops: 25
- Distance travelled: 1,960 km (1,218 mi)
- Average journey time: 34 hours 15 mins
- Service frequency: Weekly
- Train number(s): 12485 / 12486

On-board services
- Class(es): AC 3 Tier, Sleeper class & General Unreserved
- Seating arrangements: Yes
- Sleeping arrangements: Yes
- Catering facilities: E-catering

Technical
- Rolling stock: LHB coach
- Track gauge: 1,676 mm (5 ft 6 in)
- Operating speed: 57 km/h (35 mph)
Route map
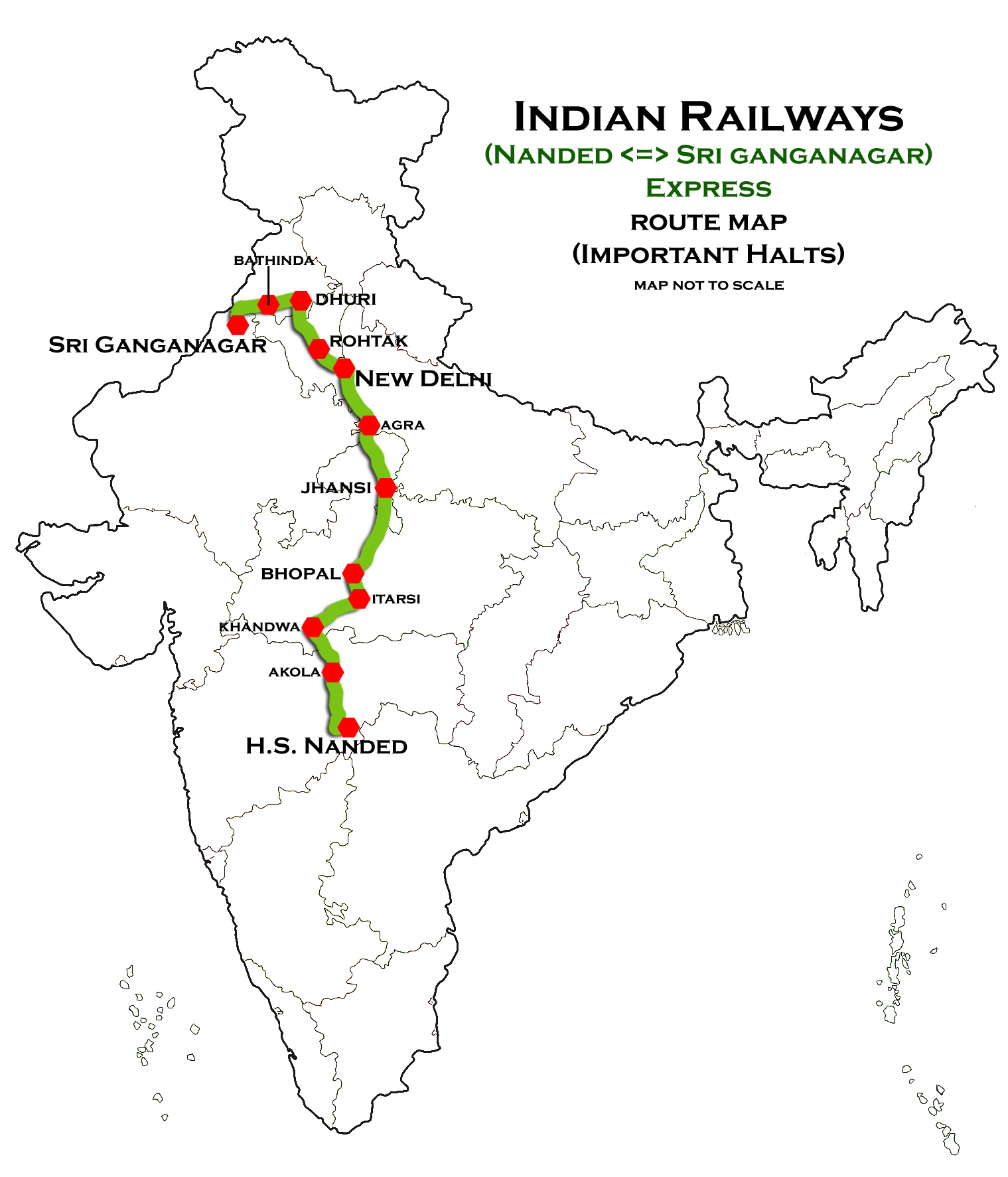

Hazur Sahib Nanded–Shri Ganganagar Express is a Superfast Express train belonging to Indian Railways North Western Railway zone that run between Hazur Sahib Nanded and Shri Ganganagar Junction in India.

== Service ==
It operates as train number 12485 from Hazur Sahib Nanded to Shri Ganganagar Junction and as train number 12486 in the reverse direction, serving the states of Maharashtra, Madhya Pradesh, Uttar Pradesh, Delhi, Haryana, Punjab & Rajasthan. The train covers the distance of 1,960 km (1,220 mi) in 34 hours 15 mins approximately at a speed of (57 km/h (35 mph)).

== Coaches ==
The 12485 / 86 Hazur Sahib Nanded–Shri Ganganagar Junction Express has one AC 2 Tier, four AC 3-tier, seven sleeper class, six general unreserved & two SLR (seating with luggage rake) coaches. It doesn't carry a pantry car.

As with most train services in India, coach composition may be amended at the discretion of Indian Railways depending on demand.

== Routeing ==
The 12485 / 86 Hazur Sahib Nanded–Shri Ganganagar Junction Express runs from Hazur Sahib Nanded via Purna Junction, Akola Junction, Itarsi Junction, Bhopal Junction, Bina Junction, Agra Cantonment, New Delhi, Bathinda Junction to Shri Ganganagar Junction.

== Traction ==
It is hauled by a Ghaziabad-based WAP-5 locomotive from NED to SGNR & vice versa.
