= Hazur Sahib Nanded railway station =

Railway station in Nanded, Maharashtra, India

Hazur Sahib Nanded
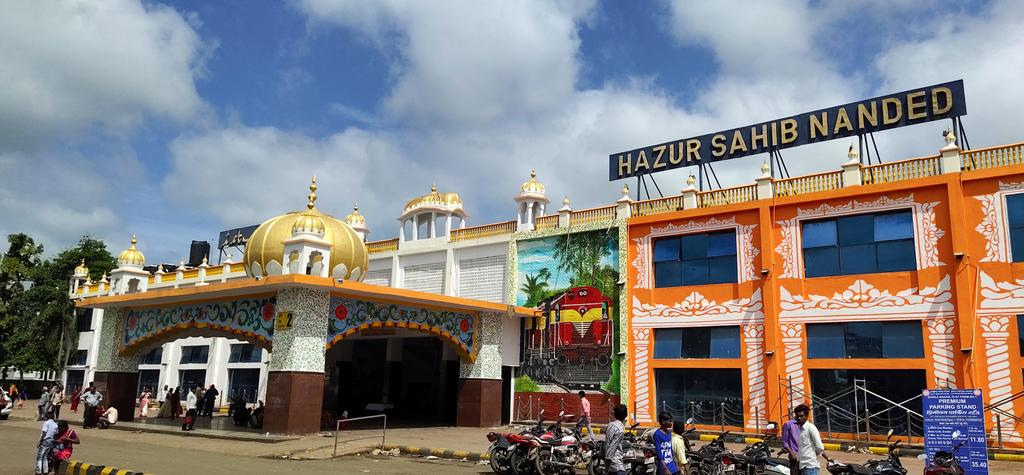
- Hazur Sahib Nanded railway station

General information
- Other names: Nanded railway station
- Location: Nanded, Maharashtra; India
- Coordinates: 19°9′38″N 77°18′30″E
- Elevation: 366 metres (1,201 ft)
- Owner: Indian Railways
- Operator: South Central Railways
- Lines: Secunderabad–Manmad line Wardha–Nanded line
- Platforms: 4
- Tracks: 7

Construction
- Structure type: At grade
- Platform levels: 1
- Parking: Yes
- Accessible: Yes

Other information
- Status: Operational
- Station code: NED
- Zone(s): South Central Railway
- Division(s): Nanded

History
- Opened: 1905

Passengers
- 2023-24: 8,190,489

Services
Preceding station	Indian Railways	Following station
Wanegaon Halt towards ?	South Central Railway zone Secunderabad–Manmad line	Maltekdi towards ?
Location
- Location within Maharashtra Location within India
- Interactive map

Hazur Sahib Nanded railway station (station code: NED) is a second grade non-suburban (NSG–2) category Indian railway station in Nanded railway division of South Central Railway zone. It serves the city of Nanded, located in Maharashtra. As of December 2023, the station recorded an originating passenger count of 8,190,489.

It is located on the Secunderabad–Manmad line of Indian Railways. The station is located at 36 m above sea level and has four platforms. As of 2018, 89 passenger trains halt each day at this station. In 2008, the station was named after Hazur Sahib, a takht of Sikhism which is situated here.

== History ==
The Hyderabad-Godavari Valley Railway was a 1,000 mm (3 ft 3 3/8 in) gauge railway. John Wallace Pringle — who had recently completed surveying routes for the Uganda railway — was appointed as the superintending engineer in 1900. The railway opened in 1900 with a 391 miles (629 km) line from Hyderabad city to Manmad Junction.

Gauge conversion to 5 ft 6 in (1,676 mm) broad gauge was completed between Manmad–Nanded/Mudhkhed in 1995. The patch between Mudkhed–Secunderabad remained metre-gauge till it was finally converted by 2003.

== Trains Originating & Terminating at Hazur Sahib Nanded railway station ==
12715 Hazur Sahib Nanded-Amritsar Sachkhand Express (via Aurangabad, New Delhi)

17630 Pune-Hazur Sahib Nanded SF Express (via Manmad, Ahmednagar)

12421 Nanded-Amritsar Weekly Superfast Express (via Akola, Khandwa, New Delhi)

14622 Firozpur Cantt. - Hazur Sahib Nanded Weekly Express (via Aurangabad, Delhi Safdarjung)

12753 Hazur Sahib Nanded-H.Nizamuddin Marathwada Sampark Kranti Express (via Aurangabad, Bhopal)

12767 Hazur Sahib Nanded-Santragachi Superfast Express (via Nagpur, Bilaspur)

17620 Hazur Sahib Nanded-Aurangabad Weekly Express (via Parbhani, Jalna)

16593 Hazur Sahib Nanded-Bangalore City Express (via Parbhani, Vikarabad)

12751 Hazur Sahib Nanded-Jammu Tawi Humsafar Express (via Khandwa, New Delhi)

12439 Hazur Sahib Nanded-Shri Ganganagar Superfast Express (via New Delhi, Hanumangarh)

17623 Hazur Sahib Nanded-Shri Ganganagar Express (via Ahmedabad, Bikaner)

12485 Hazur Sahib Nanded-Shri Ganganagar Express (via New Delhi, Bathinda)

17410 Hazur Sahib Nanded-Adilabad Express (via Mudkhed, Bhokar)

17664 Hazur Sahib Nanded-Raichur Express (via Nizamabad, Secunderabad)

22709 Hazur Sahib Nanded-Amb Andaura Weekly Express

17614 Hazur Sahib Nanded-Panvel Express (via Parbhani, Latur, Pune)

20812 Hazur Sahib Nanded-Vishakhapatnam Superfast Express (via Secunderabad, Vijaywada)

20810 Hazur Sahib Nanded-Sambalpur Nagavali Express (via Secunderabad, Vishakhapatnam)

17618 Hazur Sahib Nanded-Mumbai CSMT Tapovan Express (via Manmad, Kalyan)

Same trains terminate in reverse

== Amenities ==
Amenities at station include: lifts, escalators, computerized reservation office, waiting room, retiring room, vegetarian and non-vegetarian refreshments, and a book stall.There is a passenger coach care depot here as well as a railway hospital

== Gallery ==
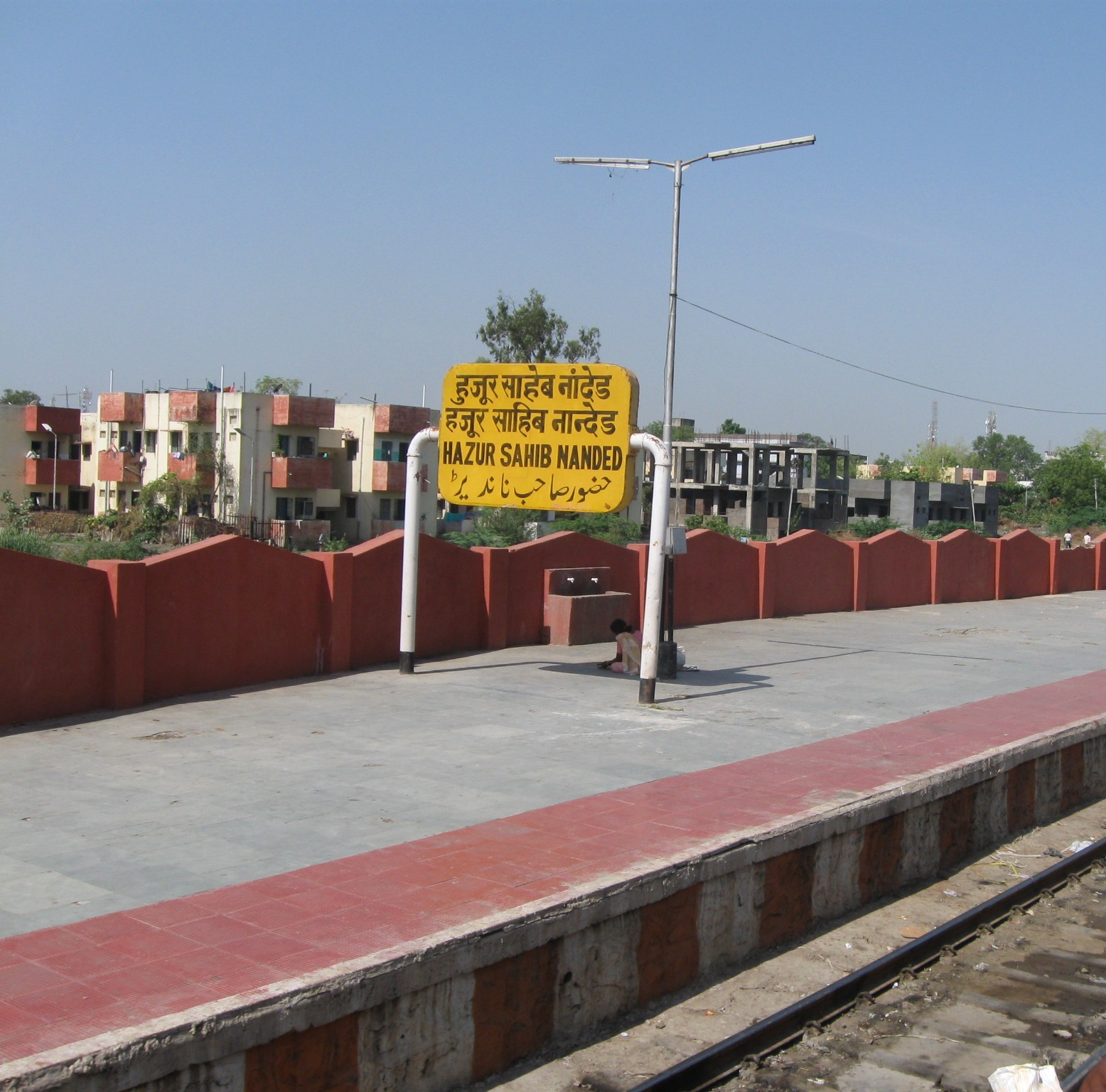
The name plate on Platform no. 4

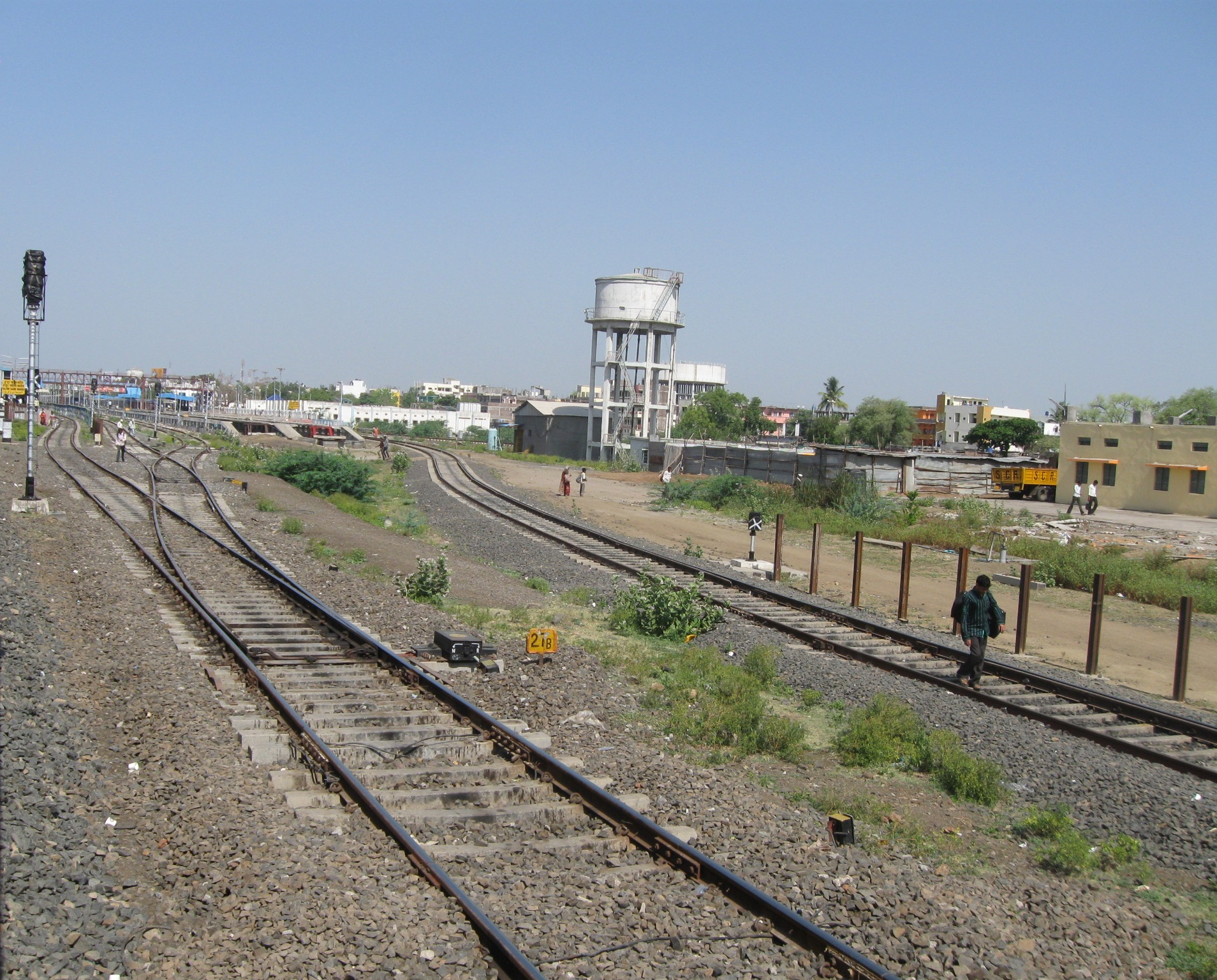
Panoramic view

== See also ==
- Maltekdi railway station, another railway station serving Nanded.
- List of railway stations in India
