= Majri Junction railway station =

Railway Station in Maharashtra, India

Majri Junction
- Indian Railways Logo

General information
- Location: India
- Coordinates: 20.1392°N 79.0430°E
- Elevation: 188 metres (617 ft)
- System: Indian Railway junction station
- Owner: Indian Railways
- Operator: Central Railway
- Lines: Delhi–Chennai line Majri–Mudkhed line
- Platforms: 3
- Tracks: 4

Construction
- Structure type: Standard on ground
- Parking: Yes
- Cycle facilities: No

Other information
- Status: Functioning
- Station code: MJRI
- Division(s): Nagpur
Location
- Location within India Location within Maharashtra

Majri Junction railway station (station code: MJRI) is a junction railway station on New Delhi–Chennai main line and Majri–Mudkhed line in Nagpur CR railway division of Central Railway Zone of Indian Railways. It serves Majri village in Chandrapur district in Maharashtra state in India. It is located at 188 m above sea level and has three platforms. 18 trains stop at this station.
