= Sri Ganganagar Junction railway station =

Railway Station in Rajasthan, India

Shri Ganga nagar railway station

General information
- Location: State Highway 7B, Shri Ganganagar, Rajasthan; India
- Coordinates: 29.9320°N 73.8718°E
- Elevation: 178 metres (584 ft)
- System: Indian Railways station
- Owner: Indian Railways
- Operator: North Western Railway
- Lines: Suratgarh–Bathinda line, Shri Ganganagar–Sadulpur line
- Platforms: 3
- Tracks: 7
- Connections: Auto stand

Construction
- Structure type: Standard (on ground station)
- Parking: Yes
- Cycle facilities: Yes

Other information
- Status: Functioning
- Station code: SGNR
- Zone(s): North Western Railway
- Division(s): Bikaner
Location
- Location within India Location within Rajasthan

Sri Ganganagar railway station is a main railway station in Sri Ganganagar District, Rajasthan. Its code is SGNR. It serves Sri Ganganagar city. The station consists of three platforms, neither of which is well sheltered Lots of facilities including water and sanitation.

== History ==
See history of railways in Bikaner and construction of Ganga Canal and railway.

== Major trains ==
Some of the important trains that runs from Shri Ganganagar are :

- 22497/98 Shri Ganganagar–Tiruchirappalli Humsafar Express
- 14711/12 Shri Ganganagar–Haridwar Intercity Express
- 12481/82 Shri Ganganagar–Delhi Intercity Express
- 12485/86 Shri Ganganagar–Hazur Sahib Nanded Express (via Abohar)
- 17623/24 Shri Ganganagar–Hazur Sahib Nanded Weekly Express (via Ahmedabad)
- 12439/40 Shri Ganganagar–Hazur Sahib Nanded Superfast Express (via Hanumangarh)
- 14525/26 Shri Ganganagar–Ambala Cantonment Intercity Express
- 14713/14 Shri Ganganagar–Jammu Tawi Express
- 16311/12 Shri Ganganagar–Kochuveli Express
- 22981/82 Shri Ganganagar–Kota Superfast Express
- 22997/98 Shri Ganganagar–Jhalawar City Superfast Express
- 13007/08 Shri Ganganagar–Howrah Udyan Abha Toofan Express
- 19707/08 Shri Ganganagar–Bandra Terminus Amarapur Aravali Express
