= Basni railway station =

Railway station in Rajasthan India

General information
- Location: State Highway 61, Jodhpur, Rajasthan; India
- Coordinates: 26.2231°N 73.0108°E
- Elevation: 220 metres (720 ft)
- System: Indian Railways station
- Owner: Indian Railways
- Operator: North Western Railways
- Line: Marwar Junction–Munabao line
- Platforms: 2
- Tracks: 3
- Connections: Taxi stand, Auto rickshaw

Construction
- Structure type: Standard (on-ground station)
- Parking: Yes
- Cycle facilities: Yes

Other information
- Status: Functioning
- Station code: BANE
- Zone(s): North Western Railway
- Division(s): Jodhpur

History
- Former names: Jodhpur–Bikaner Railways
Location

Basni railway station is a railway station on the North Western Railways network in the state of Rajasthan. Its code is BANE. It serves Jodhpur city. The station consists of two platforms. The platforms are not well sheltered. It lacks many facilities including water and sanitation. It is located approximately 7 km from Jodhpur.

== Important trains ==
Some of the important trains that run from Basni are:

- Delhi–Barmer Link Express
- Malani Express
- Bhildi–Jodhpur Demu
- Barmer–Jodhpur Passenger
- Barmer–Jodhpur DMU
- Jodhpur–Palanpur DMU
- Ajmer–Jodhpur Fast Passenger
- Ahmedabad–Jodhpur Passenger
