= Sri Ganganagar–Tiruchirappalli Humsafar Express =

Train in India

Sri Ganganagar – Tiruchirappalli Humsafar Express

Overview
- Service type: Humsafar Express
- First service: 27 February 2017; 9 years ago (Inaugural run)
- Current operator: North Western Railways

Route
- Termini: Shri Ganganagar Junction (SGNR); Tiruchirappalli Junction (TPJ)
- Stops: 35
- Distance travelled: 3,116 km (1,936 mi)
- Average journey time: 58h 25m
- Service frequency: Weekly (Note: Runs once in a week for every direction.)
- Train number: 22497 / 22498

On-board services
- Class: AC 3 tier
- Seating arrangements: No
- Sleeping arrangements: Yes
- Catering facilities: Pantry Car; On-board Catering; E-Catering

Technical
- Rolling stock: LHB Humsafar
- Track gauge: 1,676 mm (5 ft 6 in)
- Operating speed: 53.2 km/h (33.1 mph), including halts
Route map
- via Hanumangarh, Suratgarh, Bikaner, Nagaur, Jodhpur

The 22497 / 22498 Sri Ganganagar – Tiruchirappalli Humsafar Express is a superfast express train of the Indian Railways connecting Sri Ganganagar to Tiruchirappalli, providing connectivity to Rajasthan from Central Tamil Nadu. It is the 4th Humsafar Express train which is introduced in the Humsafar Express Series. It is currently being operated with the train numbers 22497/22498 on a weekly basis. During the COVID-19 Pandemic, it ran as a special service which is numbered as 02497/02498.

== Service ==
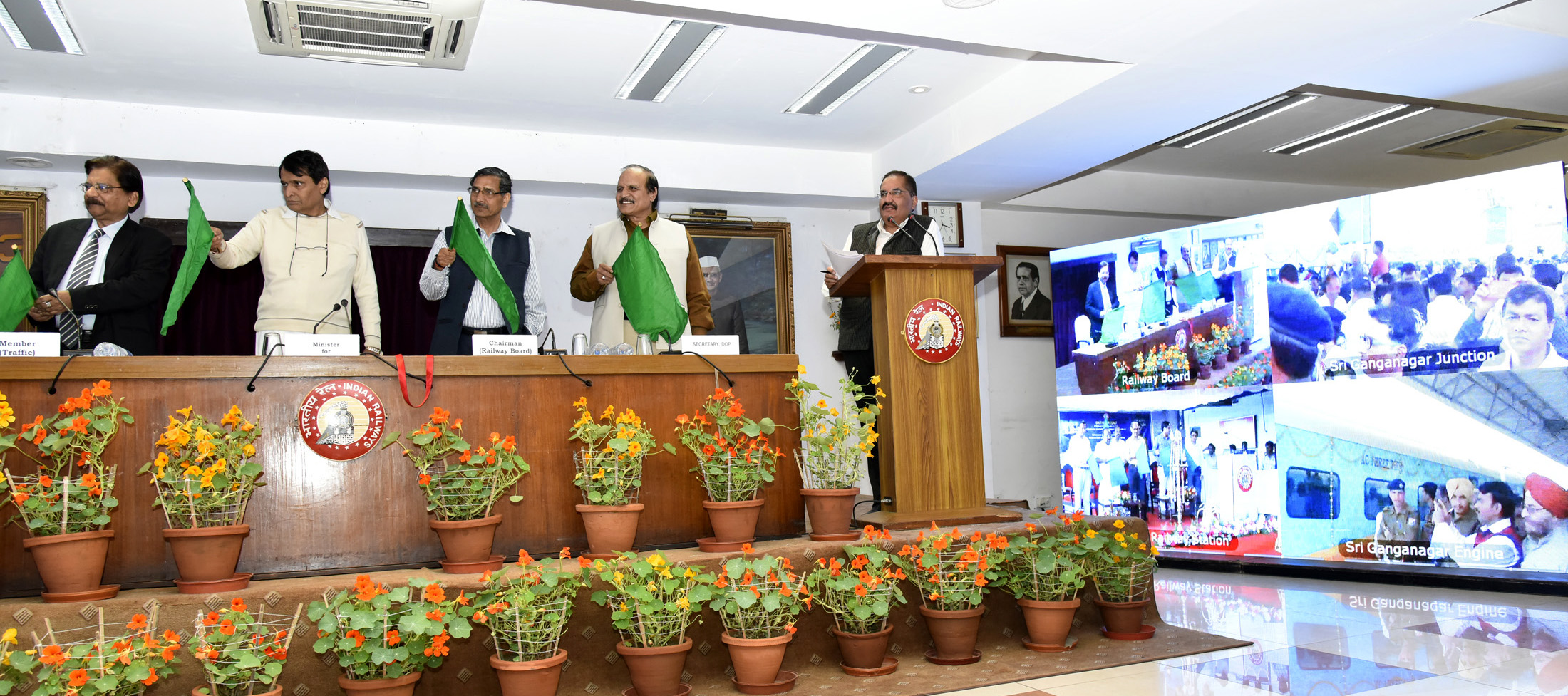
The Union Minister for Railways, Suresh Prabhakar Prabhu flagging off the Humsafar Express Sriganganagar – Tiruchirappalli, at a function, through Video Conferencing from Rail Bhavan, in New Delhi on February 27, 2017.

It averages 53 km/h (33 mph) as 22497/Sri Ganganagar - Tiruchchirappalli Humsafar Express starts on Tuesday and covering 3,116 km (1,936 mi) in 58h 25m and 54 km/h (34 mph) as 22498/Tiruchchirapalli - Sriganganagar HumSafar Express starts on Thursday covering 3,114 km (1,935 mi) in 57h 55m. The rakes have primary maintenance at Sri Ganganagar and the rakes also have secondary maintenance at Tiruchirappalli.

== Timings ==
22497 - leaves Shri Ganganagar Jn every Tuesday at 2:00 PM and reach Tiruchchirappalli Junction on Thursday at 11:20 AM IST

22498 - Leaves Tiruchchirappalli Junction Every Friday and reach Shri Ganganagar Jn on Sunday at afternoon 13:40 PM IST

== Coach composition ==
The train is completely a 3-tier AC sleeper train designed by Indian Railways with features of LED screen display to show information about stations, train speed etc. and will have announcement system as well, Vending machines for tea, coffee and milk, Bio toilets in compartments as well as CCTV cameras.

The train has standard LHB rakes with max speed of 130 km/h (81 mph). The train consists of 19 coaches :

- 16 AC III Tier
- 1 Pantry Car
- 2 End-on Generator

== Route and halts ==
- Shri Ganganagar Junction
- Hanumangarh Junction
- Suratgarh Junction
- Bikaner
- Nagaur
- Jodhpur
- Marwar Junction
- Abu Road
- Palanpur Junction
- Mahesana Junction
- Ahmedabad Junction
- Nadiad Junction
- Anand Junction
- Vadodara Junction
- Bharuch Junction
- Surat
- Vasai Road
- Kalyan Junction
- Lonavala
- Pune Junction
- Satara
- Sangli
- Miraj Junction
- Belagavi
- Dharwad
- Hubli Junction
- Harihar
- Davangere
- Birur Junction
- Arsikere Junction
- Banaswadi
- Krishnarajapuram
- Bangarapet Junction
- Salem Junction
- Namakkal
- Karur Junction
- Tiruchirappalli Junction

== Traction ==
As the entire route is fully electrified, it is hauled by a Vadodara Loco Shed based WAP 5 / WAP 7 electric locomotive from Shri Ganganagar to Pune and from Pune to Tiruchirapalli It is hauled by a WDP4D from Pune Diesel Loco Shed and vice-versa .

== Direction reversal ==
Train Reverses its direction 1 times:

- Hanumangarh Junction

== Future plans, proposals and demands ==
In order to generate more revenue and to serve more people, this train service is planned to extend till Madurai Junction from Tiruchirappalli via Dindigul.

There are prolonged demands to extend this train till kanyakumari as there is no direct train connection from Rajasthan to religious destination Kanyakumari. Similarly there are also prolonged demands to operate more train services from southern region of Tamil Nadu such as Madurai, Tirunelveli to places like Ahamedabad, Mumbai, Pune and Bangalore as the existing train services are not enough to cater the needs of the people in these routes. So there is a strong demands from various regions of people to extend this train till kanyakumari or to Rameswaram as this train runs vacant mostly.

== See also ==
- Humsafar Express
- Tiruchirappalli Junction railway station
- Shri Ganganagar Junction railway station
