= Thiruvananthapuram North–Shri Ganganagar Junction Express =

Express train

Shri Ganganagar Junction–Thiruvananthapuram North Express
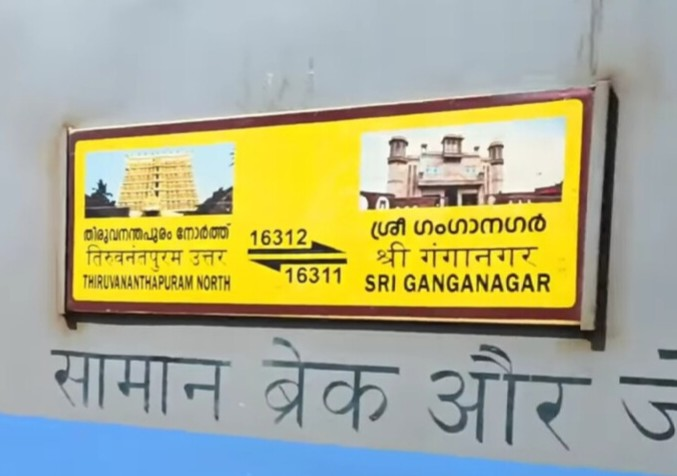

Overview
- Service type: Express
- Current operator: Southern Railway zone

Route
- Termini: Shri Ganganagar Junction; Thiruvananthapuram North
- Stops: 46
- Distance travelled: 3,013 km (1,872 mi)
- Average journey time: 48 hours 05 mins
- Service frequency: Weekly
- Train number: 16311 / 16312

On-board services
- Classes: AC 2 tier, AC 3 tier, sleeper class, general unreserved
- Seating arrangements: Yes
- Sleeping arrangements: Yes
- Catering facilities: Yes

Technical
- Rolling stock: LHB coach
- Track gauge: 1,676 mm (5 ft 6 in)
- Operating speed: 50 km/h (31 mph)

The 16311 / 12 Shri Ganganagar Junction–Thiruvananthapuram North Express is an express train belonging to Indian Railways Southern Zone that runs between Shri Ganganagar Junction and Thiruvananthapuram North in India.

It operates as train number 16311 from Shri Ganganagar Junction to Thiruvananthapuram North and as train number 16312 in the reverse direction serving the states of Rajasthan, Gujarat, Maharashtra, Goa, Karnataka and Kerala.

On 3 August 2018, this train was running as Bikaner Thiruvananthapuram North Express after being extended to Shri Ganganagar Junction. It is running now as Shri Ganganagar Junction Thiruvananthapuram North Express.

== Coaches ==
The 16311 / 12 Shri Ganganagar Junction–Thiruvananthapuram North Express has a total of 22 coaches which includes two AC 2-tier, three AC 3-tier, 11 sleeping cars, three general unreserved and two EOG coaches. It carries a pantry car coach.

As is customary with most train services in India, coach composition may be amended at the discretion of Indian Railways depending on demand.

== Service ==
The 16311 Shri Ganganagar Junction–Thiruvananthapuram North Express covers the distance of 3,013 km (1,872 mi) in 59:35 (51 km/h) and in 60:30 as the 16312 Kochuveli–Shri Ganganagar Junction Express (50 km/h).

Because the average speed of the train is lower than 55 km/h (34 mph), its fare doesn't includes a Superfast surcharge as per railway rules.

== Routing ==
The 16311 / 12 Shri Ganganagar Junction–Thiruvananthapuram North Express runs from Shri Ganganagar Junction via Suratgarh Junction, Bikaner Junction, Nagaur, Merta Road Junction, Jodhpur Junction, Abu Road, Ahmedabad Junction, Vadodara Junction, Surat, Vasai Road, Panvel, Ratnagiri, Madgaon Junction, Kundapura, Mangalore Junction, Kannur, Koyilandy, Kozhikode, Tirur, Shoranur Junction, Thrissur, Ernakulam Town, Kottayam, Tiruvalla, Chengannur, Kollam Junction to Kochuveli.

== Traction ==
As the route is fully electrified, an Electric Loco Shed, Erode based WAP-7 hauls the train from Shri Ganganagar Junction to Thiruvananthapuram North.
