= Sambhar Lake Town railway station =

Railway station in Rajasthan, India

General information
- Location: Sambhar Lake Town, Jaipur district, Rajasthan; India
- Coordinates: 26.9039°N 75.1799°E
- Elevation: 369 metres (1,211 ft)
- System: Indian Railways station
- Owner: Indian Railways
- Operator: North Western Railway
- Platforms: 1
- Tracks: 4
- Connections: Auto stand

Construction
- Structure type: Standard (on ground station)

Other information
- Status: Functioning
- Station code: SBR
- Zone(s): North Western Railway
- Division(s): Jodhpur
Location
- Location within Rajasthan Location within India

Sambhar Lake Town railway station is in Jaipur district, Rajasthan. Its code is SBR. It serves Sambhar Lake Town and station consists of two platforms. Nearest junction is Phulera Junction.

== Major trains ==
Some of the important trains that runs from Sambhar Lake Town are:

- 54811/54812 Bhopal–Jodhpur Express connects the town with Jaipur, Kota, Bhopal, Sawai Madhopur, Makrana, Degana etc.
- 14853/14854/14863/14864 Varanasi–Jodhpur Marudhar Express connects the city with Varanasi, Lucknow, Agra, Jaipur etc.
- 22981/22982 Kota–Sri Ganganagar Express from Kota via. Bikaner to Sri Ganganagar via. Suratgarh
- 12467/12468 Leelan Express from Jaisalmer to Jaipur via Merta Road, Bikaner, Lalgarh, etc.
- 59705 /59706 Suratgarh–Jaipur Fast Passenger vai. Phulera, Makrana, Medta Road, Nagour, Bikaner, etc.
