= Hazur Sahib Nanded–Jammu Tawi Humsafar Express =

Train in India

Hazur Sahib Nanded - Jammu Tawi Humsafar Express
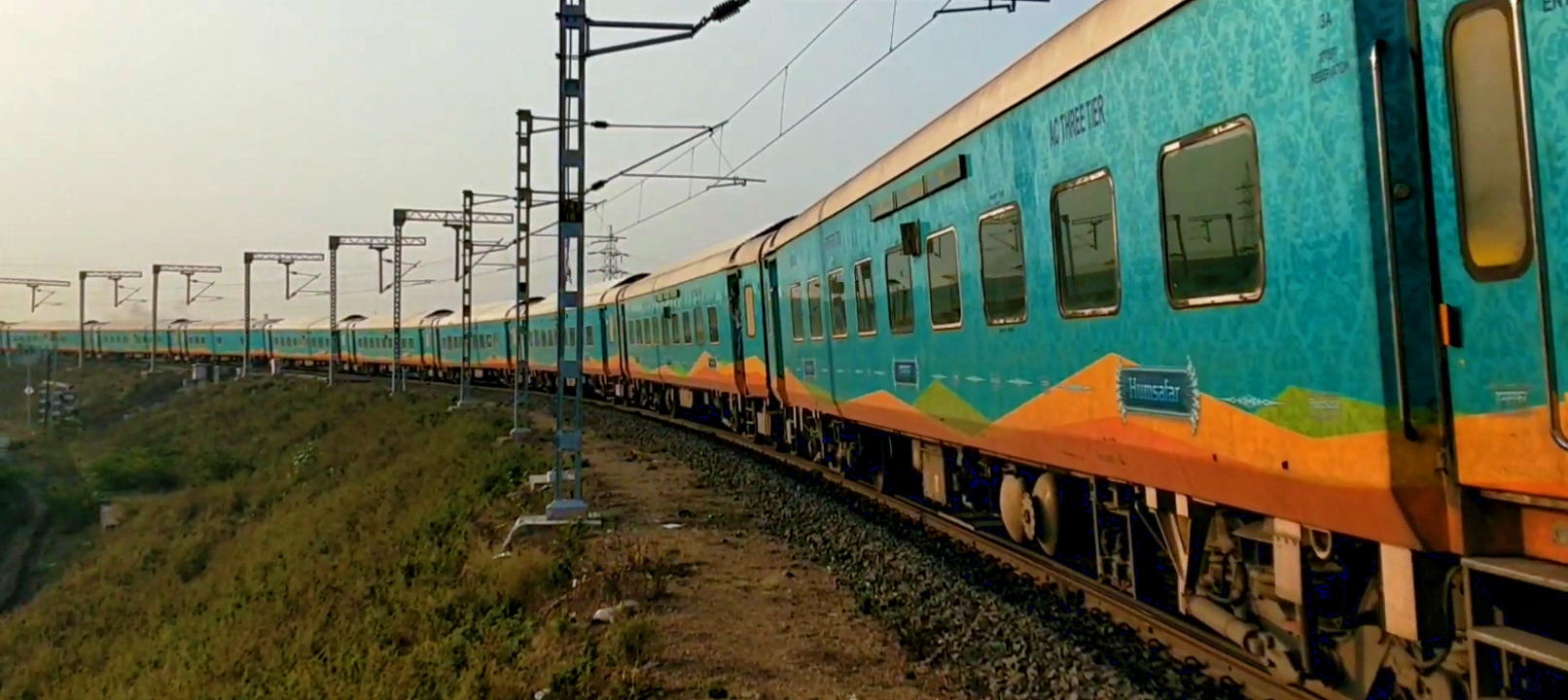

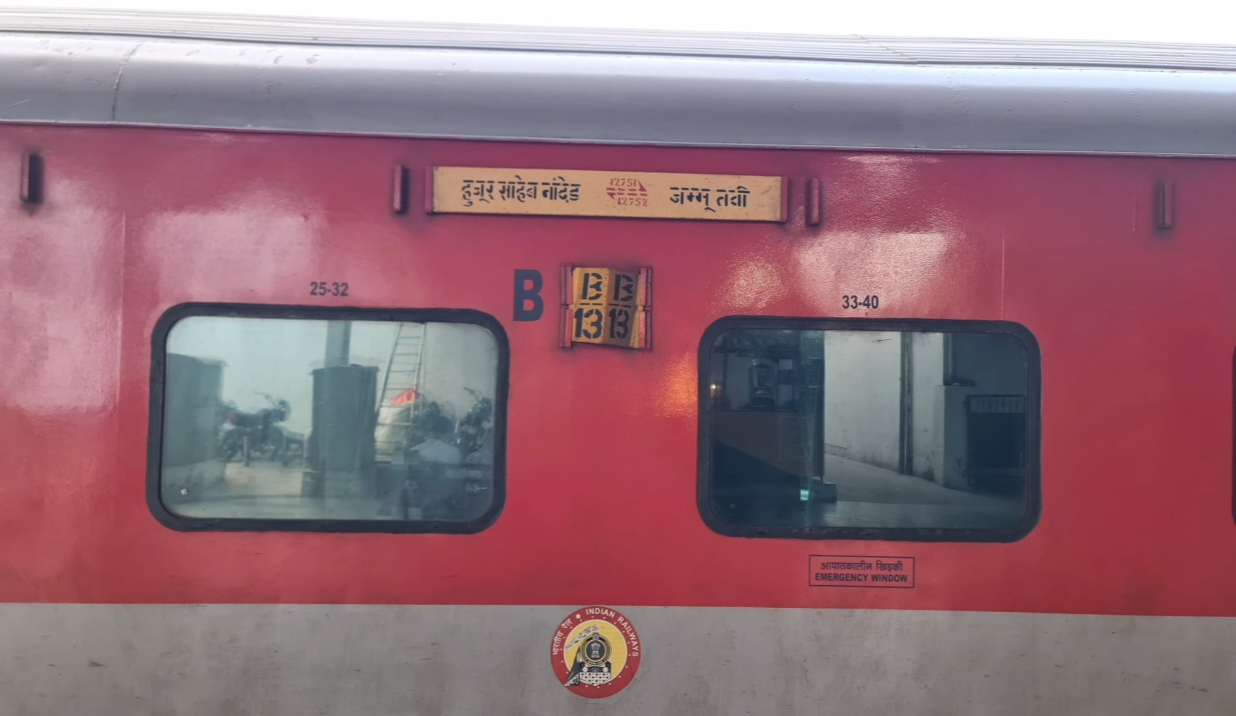
- Hazur Sahib Nanded - Jammu Tawi Humsafar Express At Itarsi Junction railway station

Overview
- Service type: Humsafar Express
- First service: 5 October 2018; 7 years ago
- Current operator: South Central Railways

Route
- Termini: Hazur Sahib Nanded (NED); Jammu Tawi (JAT)
- Stops: 21
- Distance travelled: 2,049 km (1,273 mi)
- Average journey time: 37h
- Service frequency: Weekly
- Train number: 12751 / 12752

On-board services
- Class: AC 3 tier
- Seating arrangements: No
- Sleeping arrangements: Yes
- Catering facilities: Available
- Observation facilities: Large windows
- Baggage facilities: Yes

Technical
- Rolling stock: LHB Humsafar
- Track gauge: 1,676 mm (5 ft 6 in)
- Operating speed: 55 km/h (34 mph) Avg. Speed

Hazur Sahib Nanded - Jammu Tawi Humsafar Express is an AC super-fast express train of the Indian Railways connecting Hazur Sahib Nanded in Maharashtra and Jammu Tawi in Jammu and Kashmir. It is currently being operated with 12751/12752 train numbers on a weekly basis.

== Coach composition ==
The train is completely 3-tier AC sleeper designed by Indian Railways with features of LED screen display to show information about stations, train speed etc. and will have announcement system as well, Vending machines for tea, coffee and milk, Bio toilets in compartments as well as CCTV cameras.

== Service ==
It averages 55 km/h (34 mph) as 12751/Hazur Sahib Nanded - Jammu Tawi Humsafar Express starts on Friday from Hazur Sahib Nanded covering 2,049 km (1,273 mi) in 37 hrs & 55 km/h (34 mph) as 12752/Jammu Tawi - Hazur Sahib Nanded Humsafar Express starts on Sunday from Jammu Tawi covering 2,049 km (1,273 mi) in 37 hrs 20 min.

== Traction ==
This train is hauled by Ghaziabad Electric Loco Shed based WAP 7 locomotive from NED to JAT and vice versa.

== Route and halts ==
1. Hazur Sahib Nanded
2. Purna Junction
3. Hingoli Deccan
4. Washim
5. Akola Junction
6. Malkapur
7. Itarsi Junction
8. Rani Kamalapati
9. Bina Junction
10. Bhopal Junction
11. Jhansi Junction
12. Gwalior
13. Agra Cantonment
14. Mathura
15. New Delhi
16. Ambala Cantonment
17. Patiala
18. Dhuri Junction
19. Ludhiana
20. Jalandhar Cantonment
21. Pathankot Cantonment
22. Jammu Tawi

== See also ==
- Indore - Puri Humsafar Express
- Humsafar Express
