= Tiruchanur railway station =

Railway station in Andhra Pradesh India

General information
- Location: Tirupati–Renigunta Road,Tiruchanur, Tirupati, Andhra Pradesh; India
- Coordinates: 13°37′40″N 79°25′10″E
- System: Passenger train and Commuter rail station
- Owner: Government of India
- Operator: Indian Railways
- Line: Gudur–Katpadi branch line
- Platforms: 3 side platform
- Tracks: 4
- Train operators: Indian Railways

Construction
- Structure type: Standard (on ground)
- Accessible: Disabled access

Other information
- Station code: TCNR
- Zone(s): South Coast Railway
- Division(s): Guntakal

History
- Opened: December 26, 2020

Services
Preceding station	Indian Railways	Following station
Tirupati Main towards ?	South Coast Railway zone Gudur–Katpadi branch line	Renigunta towards ?
Location
- Location within Andhra Pradesh Location within India

Tiruchanur railway station (station code: TCNR) is a B-category Indian Railways station in Tiruchanur, Tirupati city of Andhra Pradesh. It is part of Guntakal railway division of South Coast Railway zone. It is situated on the Guntakal–Renigunta section and provides rail connectivity to Tirupati and its suburbs such as Tiruchanur, Tirumala in Tirupati district.

== See also ==
- List of railway stations in India
