= Suratgarh Junction railway station =

Railway Station in Rajasthan, India

Suratgarh railway station

General information
- Location: Suratgarh–Hanumangarh Road, Suratgarh, Rajasthan; India
- Coordinates: 29.3242°N 73.9068°E
- Elevation: 172 metres (564 ft)
- System: Indian Railways station
- Owner: Indian Railways
- Operator: North Western Railway
- Platforms: 4
- Tracks: 9
- Connections: Auto stand

Construction
- Structure type: Standard (on ground station)
- Platform levels: High
- Parking: Yes
- Cycle facilities: Yes

Other information
- Status: Functioning
- Station code: SOG
- Zone(s): North Western Railway
- Division(s): Bikaner
Location

Suratgarh railway station is a main railway station in Sri Ganganagar district, Rajasthan. Its code is SOG. It serves Suratgarh city. The station consists of four platforms, none of which is well sheltered. It lacks many facilities, including water and sanitation. The station lies on the Jodhpur–Bathinda line and is well connected to the rest of India. Ranked Top Ten in country in Station Cleanliness Survey 2019.

== Major trains ==
Some of the important trains that services Suratgarh are:

- Bhavnagar Terminus–Udhampur Janmabhoomi Express
- Jammu Tawi–Ahmedabad Express
- Avadh Assam Express
- Barmer–Rishikesh Express
- Delhi Sarai Rohilla–Bikaner Express (via Sri Ganganagar)
- Sri Ganganagar–Tiruchirappalli Humsafar Express
- Bikaner–Bilaspur Antyodaya Express
- Hazur Sahib Nanded–Shri Ganganagar Weekly Express
- Kochuveli–Shri Ganganagar Junction Express
