= Abohar Junction railway station =

Railway Station in Punjab, India

Abohar Junction

General information
- Location: Station Rd, Abohar, Fazilka district, Punjab; India
- Coordinates: 30°08′21″N 74°11′42″E
- Elevation: 185.78 metres (609.5 ft)
- System: Indian Railways junction station
- Owner: Indian Railways
- Operator: Northern Railway
- Lines: Fazilka–Abohar–Sri Ganganagar line, Sri Ganganagar–Abohar–Bathinda line
- Platforms: 2
- Tracks: 3 nos 5 ft 6 in (1,676 mm) broad gauge

Construction
- Structure type: Standard on ground
- Parking: Yes
- Accessible: Wheelchair ramp Wheelchair available

Other information
- Status: Functioning
- Station code: ABS
- Division(s): Ambala

History
- Opened: 1892

Passengers
- 2018: 5662 per day
Location
- Location within Punjab

Abohar Junction (station code: ABS) is located in Fazilka district in the Indian state of Punjab and serves Abohar city. Abohar station falls under Ambala railway division of Northern Railway zone of Indian Railways. Abohar city is the administrative headquarter of Abohar Tehsil in Fazilka district.

== Overview ==
Abohar railway station is located at an elevation of 185.78 metres (609.5 ft). It is one of the oldest train stations established in 1892 on Indian subcontinent during British Raj. This station is located on the single track, 5 ft 6 in (1,676 mm) broad gauge, Bathinda–Sri Ganganagar line.

== Electrification ==
Abohar railway station is situated on single track DMU line. The electrification of the single track BG Bathinda–Abohar–Sriganga Nagar line is in the pipeline.

== Amenities ==
Abohar railway station has 6 booking windows, one enquiry office and all basic amenities like drinking water, public toilets, sheltered area with adequate seating. Wheelchair availability is also there for disabled persons. There are two platforms at the station and one foot overbridge(FOB).
