= Hazur Sahib Nanded–Shri Ganganagar Weekly Express =

Train in India

Overview
- Service type: Express
- First service: 19 February 2015; 11 years ago
- Current operator: South Central Railway

Route
- Termini: Hazur Sahib Nanded (NED); Shri Ganganagar Junction (SGNR)
- Stops: 33
- Distance travelled: 1,992 km (1,238 mi)
- Average journey time: 36hrs 10mins
- Service frequency: Weekly (Note: Runs one day in a week for every direction.)
- Train number: 22723 / 22724

On-board services
- Classes: AC 2 tier, AC 3 tier, Sleeper class, General Unreserved
- Seating arrangements: No
- Sleeping arrangements: Yes
- Catering facilities: Available
- Observation facilities: Large windows
- Baggage facilities: No
- Other facilities: Below the seats

Technical
- Rolling stock: LHB coach
- Track gauge: 1,676 mm (5 ft 6 in)
- Operating speed: 55 km/h (34 mph) average including halts

The 22723 / 22724 Hazur Sahib Nanded–Shri Ganganagar Weekly Express is an Express train belonging to South Central Railway zone that runs between Hazur Sahib Nanded and Shri Ganganagar Junction railway station in India. It is currently being operated with 22723/22724 train numbers on a weekly basis.

== Service ==
The 22723/Hazur Sahib Nanded–Shri Ganganagar Weekly Express has an average speed of 55 km/h and covers 1992 km in 36h 10m.

The 22724/Shri Ganganagar–Hazur Sahib Nanded Weekly Express has an average speed of 54 km/h and covers 1992 km in 36h 20m.

== Route and halts ==
The important halts of the train are:

- Hazur Sahib Nanded
- Purna Junction
- Akola Junction
- Malkapur
- Bhusaval Junction
- Jalgaon Junction
- Nandurbar
- Surat
- Vadodara Junction
- Ahmedabad Junction
- Abu Road
- Marwar Junction
- Pali Marwar
- Jodhpur Junction
- Merta Road Junction
- Nagaur
- Bikaner Junction
- Shri Ganganagar Junction.

== Coach composition ==
The train has standard LHB rakes with a maximum speed of 130 kmph. The train consists of 18 coaches:

- 1 AC II Tier
- 2 AC III Tier
- 7 Sleeper coaches
- 6 General Unreserved
- 2 Seating cum Luggage Rake

== Traction ==
Both trains are hauled by an Electric Loco Shed, Bhusawal WAP-4 electric locomotive from Nanded to Sri Ganganagar and vice versa.

== Direction reversal ==
Train reverses its direction 1 times:

- Purna Junction

== See also ==
- Hazur Sahib Nanded railway station
- Shri Ganganagar Junction railway station
