= Bathinda Junction railway station =

Junction train station in Punjab, India

Bathinda Junction railway station ਬਠਿੰਡਾ ਜੰਕਸ਼ਨ
- Bathinda Junction Railway Station

General information
- Location: The Mall Road, Bathinda, Punjab; India
- Coordinates: 30°12′37″N 74°55′58″E
- Elevation: 208 metres (682 ft)
- System: Indian Railways junction station
- Owner: Ministry of Railways (India)
- Operator: Indian Railways
- Lines: Delhi–Fazilka line, Jodhpur–Bathinda line, Bathinda–Rewari line, Bathinda–Rajpura-Shri Ganganagar line, firozpur–Bathinda line
- Platforms: 7
- Tracks: 18 5 ft 6 in (1,676 mm) broad gauge

Construction
- Structure type: At grade
- Parking: Yes
- Cycle facilities: No
- Accessible: Disabled access

Other information
- Status: Functioning
- Station code: BTI
- Zone(s): Northern Railway
- Division(s): Ambala

History
- Opened: 1884; 142 years ago
Route map
- Source: Google Maps
Location
- Location within Punjab Location within India

Bathinda Junction railway station is located in Bathinda in the Indian state of Punjab.

== Background ==
Bathinda railway station is at an elevation of 207 metres (679 ft). Its station code is BTI.

Bathinda is classified as an "A category" station in Ambala railway division. It is well connected by rail to almost all major cities. It is an important junction and terminal located on the Delhi–Ferozpur main line of the Northern Railway. In August 2018, the station became fully electrified. Electric trains now run from the station.

== Major trains ==
Trains that originate from Bathinda Junction are:

- Gorakdham Express (12555/12556)
- Delhi–Fazilka Intercity Express (14507/14508)
- Abohar–Jodhpur–Bathinda Express (14721/14722)
- Kisan Express (14731/14732)
- Farakka Express (via Sultanpur) (15733/15734)
- Farakka Express (via Ayodhya Cantt) (15743/15744)

== History ==
The Rajputana–Malwa Railway extended the 1,000 mm (3 ft 3 3/8 in)-wide metre-gauge Delhi–Rewari line to Bathinda in 1884. The Bathinda–Rewari metre-gauge line was converted to 1,676 mm (5 ft 6 in)-wide 5 ft 6 in (1,676 mm) broad gauge in 1994. Bathinda was the world's oldest and largest commercial metre-gauge railway junction until 2003.

The Southern Punjab Railway Co. opened the Delhi–Bathinda-Samasatta line in 1897.

In 1901–1902, the metre-gauge Jodhpur–Bikaner line was extended to Bathinda by Jodhpur–Bikaner Railway. It was subsequently converted to broad gauge.

== Amenities ==
Bathinda railway station has two double-bedded non-AC retiring rooms for rent by the day. Other amenities at the station include: waiting rooms (separate for upper and second class, and for males and females) with bathing facilities, refreshment rooms, cloak room, book and essential goods stalls, public phone and internet facilities, water coolers, and pay and use toilets.

Preceding station	Indian Railways	Following station
Terminus	North Western Railway zone Bathinda–Rewari line	Gahri Bhagi towards ?
Katar Singhwala towards ?	Northern Railway zone Delhi–Fazilka line	Goneana Bhai Jagta towards ?
Gursar Shnewala towards ?	North Western Railway zone Jodhpur–Bathinda line	Terminus
Terminus	North Western Railway zone Suratgarh–Bathinda line	Bahman Dwana towards ?
Terminus	North Western Railway zone Bathinda–Rajpura line	Bathinda Cantonment towards ?
