= Tirupati–Chikkmagaluru Weekly Express =

Train in India

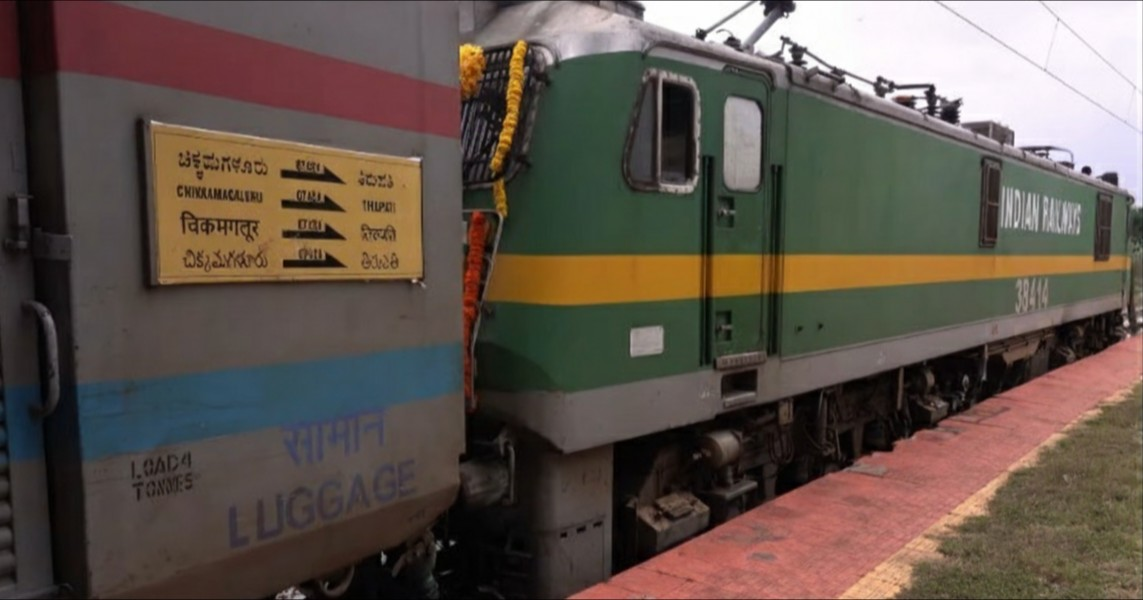
- Tirupati Chikkmagaluru Express arriving Birur Junction

Overview
- Service type: Express
- Status: Active
- Locale: Andhra Pradesh, Tamil Nadu and Karnataka
- First service: 17 July 2025; 10 months ago
- Current operator: South Coast Railway (SCoR)

Route
- Termini: Tirupati (TPTY); Chikkmagaluru (CMGR)
- Stops: 20
- Distance travelled: 594 km (369 mi)
- Average journey time: 13h 30m
- Service frequency: Weekly
- Train number: 17423 / 17424

On-board services
- Classes: General Unreserved, Sleeper Class, AC 2nd Class, AC 3rd Class
- Seating arrangements: Yes
- Sleeping arrangements: Yes
- Catering facilities: No
- Observation facilities: Large windows
- Baggage facilities: No
- Other facilities: Below the seats

Technical
- Rolling stock: LHB coach
- Track gauge: 1,676 mm (5 ft 6 in)
- Electrification: No
- Operating speed: 130 km/h (81 mph) maximum, 44 km/h (27 mph) average including halts.
- Track owner: Indian Railways

The 17423 / 17424 Tirupati–Chikkmagaluru Weekly Express is an Express train belonging to South Coast Railway zone that runs between the city Tirupati of Andhra Pradesh and Chikkmagaluru of Karnataka in India.

It operates as train number 17423 from Tirupati to Chikkmagaluru and as train number 17424 in the reverse direction, serving the states of Andhra Pradesh, Tamil Nadu and Karnataka.

== Services ==
• 17423/ Tirupati–Chikkmagaluru Express has an average speed of 44 km/h and covers 594 km in 13h 30m.

• 17424/ Chikkmagaluru–Tirupati Express has an average speed of 42 km/h and covers 594 km in 14h 10m.

== Routes and halts ==
The Important Halts of the train are :

● Tirupati

● Pakala Junction

● Chittoor

● Katpadi Junction

● Jolarpettai Junction

● Kuppam

● Bangrapet Junction

● Whitefield

● Krishnarajapuram

● Sir M. Visvesvaraya Terminal Bengaluru

● Chikka Banavara Junction

● Tumakuru

● Tiptur

● Arsikere Junction

● Devanur

● Kadur Junction

● Birur Junction

● Bisalehalli

● Sakarayapatna

● Chikkmagaluru

== Schedule ==
• 17423 - 9:00 PM (Thursday) [Tirupati]

• 17424–5:30 PM (Friday) [Chikkmagaluru]

== Coach composition ==
1. General Unreserved - 4
2. Sleeper Class - 6
3. AC 3rd Class - 4
4. AC 2nd Class - 2

== Traction ==
As the entire route is not electrified, it is hauled by a Gooty, Krishnarajapuram Loco Shed-based WDP 4D diesel locomotive from Tirupati to Chikkmagaluru and vice versa.

== Rake reversal ==
The train will reverse 1 time :

1. Birur Junction

== See also ==
Trains from Tirupati :

1. Tirupati–Karimnagar Superfast Express
2. Tirupati–Secunderabad Superfast Express
3. Tirupati–Jammu Tawi Humsafar Express
4. Seven Hills Express
5. Secunderabad–Tirupati Vande Bharat Express

No trains from Chikkmagaluru :

== Notes ==
a. Runs 1 day in a week with both directions.
