= Arasikere (disambiguation) =

Arasikere may also refer to:

- Arsikere, a city in the Hassan district of Karnataka, India
  - Arsikere Assembly constituency, in the Karnataka Legislative Assembly
  - Arsikere Junction railway station
  - Mysuru–Arsikere Passenger, a passenger train between the Arsikere and Mysuru in Karnataka
- Arsikeri, a village in Harapanahalli taluk, Bellary district, Karnataka, India
- Arasikere, Tumkur, a village in Tumkur district, Karnataka, India
