= Rajkot–Secunderabad Express =

Train in India

Overview
- Service type: Superfast
- Locale: Telangana, Karnataka, Maharashtra & Gujarat
- First service: 5 April 1987; 39 years ago
- Current operator: South Central Railway

Route
- Termini: Rajkot (RJT); Secunderabad (SC)
- Stops: 26
- Distance travelled: 1,472 km (915 mi)
- Average journey time: 26 hrs 30 mins
- Service frequency: Tri-weekly
- Train number: 22717 / 22718

On-board services
- Classes: AC 2 Tier, AC 3 Tier, Sleepar Class, General Unreserved
- Seating arrangements: Yes
- Sleeping arrangements: Yes
- Catering facilities: E-catering, On-board catering
- Observation facilities: Large windows
- Baggage facilities: Below the seats
- Other facilities: Below the seats

Technical
- Rolling stock: LHB coach
- Track gauge: 1,676 mm (5 ft 6 in) broad gauge
- Operating speed: 57 km/h (35 mph) average including halts.
Route map
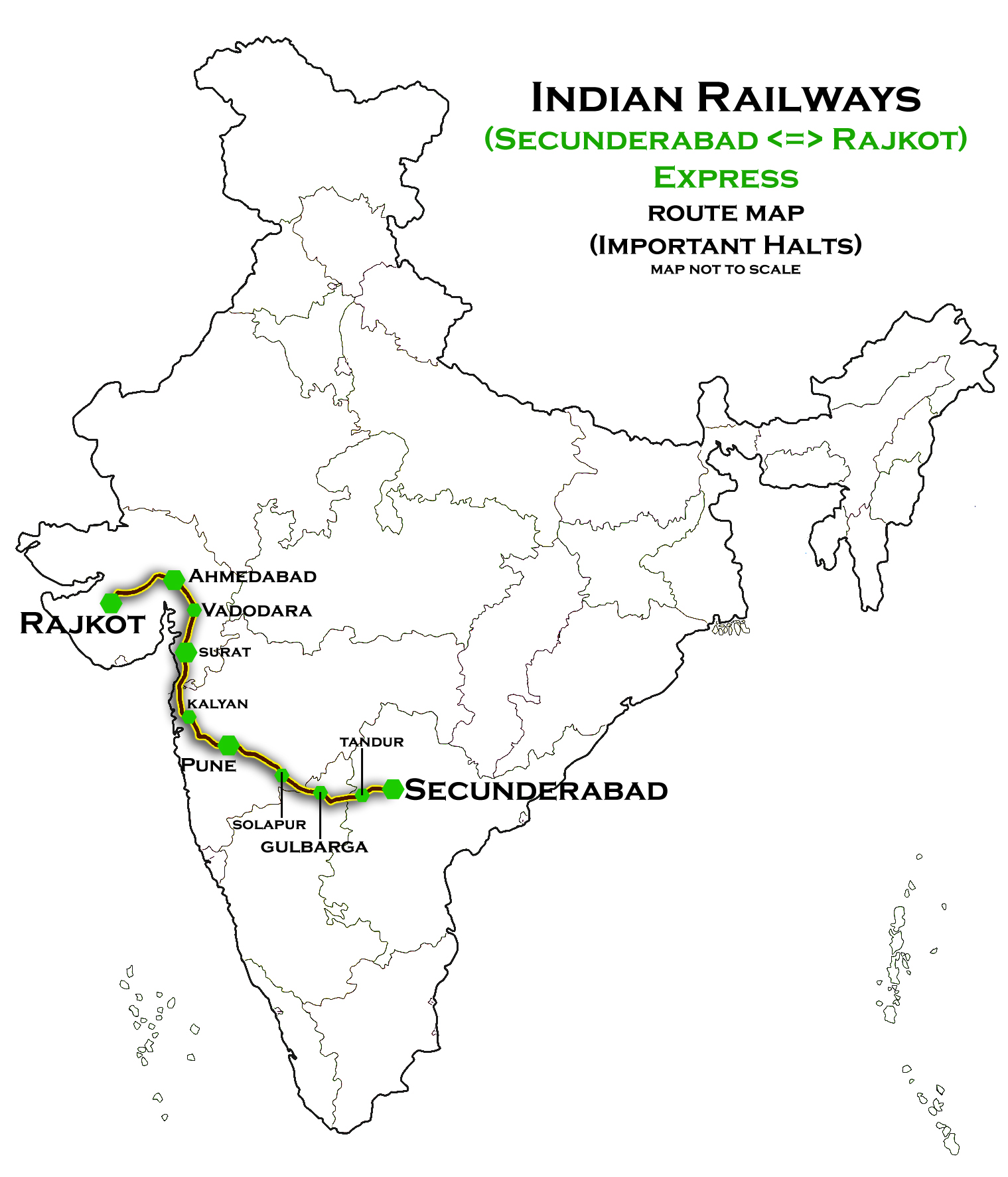

The 22717 / 22718 Rajkot - Secunderabad Express is the superfast trains operated by the South Central Railway zone of the Indian Railways between Rajkot Junction in Gujarat and Secunderabad Junction in Hyderabad, Telangana.

== History ==
The Rajkot–Secunderabad Express is a popular train in the South Central Railway zone of the Indian Railways. It is only one of three trains connecting Hyderabad with Rajkot in the state of Gujarat, the other two being the Bhavnagar Terminus–Kakinada Port Express and the Rameswaram–Okha Express. The train was introduced in the year 1985 to run from Ahmedabad to Hyderabad as a weekly super-fast train. But, due to the increasing rush of passengers the train was made bi-weekly in June 2001 and tri-weekly in April 2003. The train was later extended to Rajkot and was degraded to Express status as the number of stops were increased.

Over the years, some class train coaches have been augmented or reduced, train numbers were changed from 17017 / 17018 to 22717 / 22718 and it was converted from an express to a superfast train in late 2021.

== Coach composition ==
The train has standard LHB rakes with max speed of 110 kmph. The train consists of 21/22 coaches:

- 2 AC II Tier
- 5 AC III Tier
- 10 Sleeper coaches
- 2/3 General Unreserved
- 2 Seating cum Luggage Rake

== Service ==
The 22717/Rajkot–Secunderabad Express has an average speed of 56 km/h and covers 1472 km in 26 hrs 10 mins.

The 22718/Secunderabad–Rajkot Express has an average speed of 55 km/h and covers 1472 km in 26 hrs 50 mins.

== Route and halts ==
The 22717/18 Rajkot–Secunderabad Express runs from Rajkot Junction via Surendranagar Junction, Ahmedabad Junction, Vadodara Junction, Surat, Vasai Road, Kalyan Junction, Pune Junction, Solapur, Kalaburagi Junction, Wadi Junction to Secunderabad Junction.

== Schedule ==
| Train number | Station code | Departure station | Departure time | Departure day | Arrival station | Arrival time | Arrival day |
|---|---|---|---|---|---|---|---|
| 22717 | RJT | Rajkot Junction | 05:30 AM | Mon, Wed, Thu | Secunderabad Junction | 07:40 AM | Tue, Thu, Fri |
| 22718 | SC | Secunderabad Junction | 15:00 PM | Mon, Tue, Sat | Rajkot Junction | 17:50 PM | Sun, Tue, Wed |

== Traction ==
Both trains are hauled by a Vijayawada Loco Shed based WAP-4 or Lallaguda Loco Shed based WAP-7 electric locomotive from Rajkot to Secunderabad and vice-versa.

== Rake sharing ==
The train shares its rake with

- 12769/12770 Seven Hills Express
- 12761/12762 Tirupati-Karimnagar Superfast Express.
