= Mysore division =

Coordinates: 12.3°N 76.7°E

- Administrative division
- Mysuru division
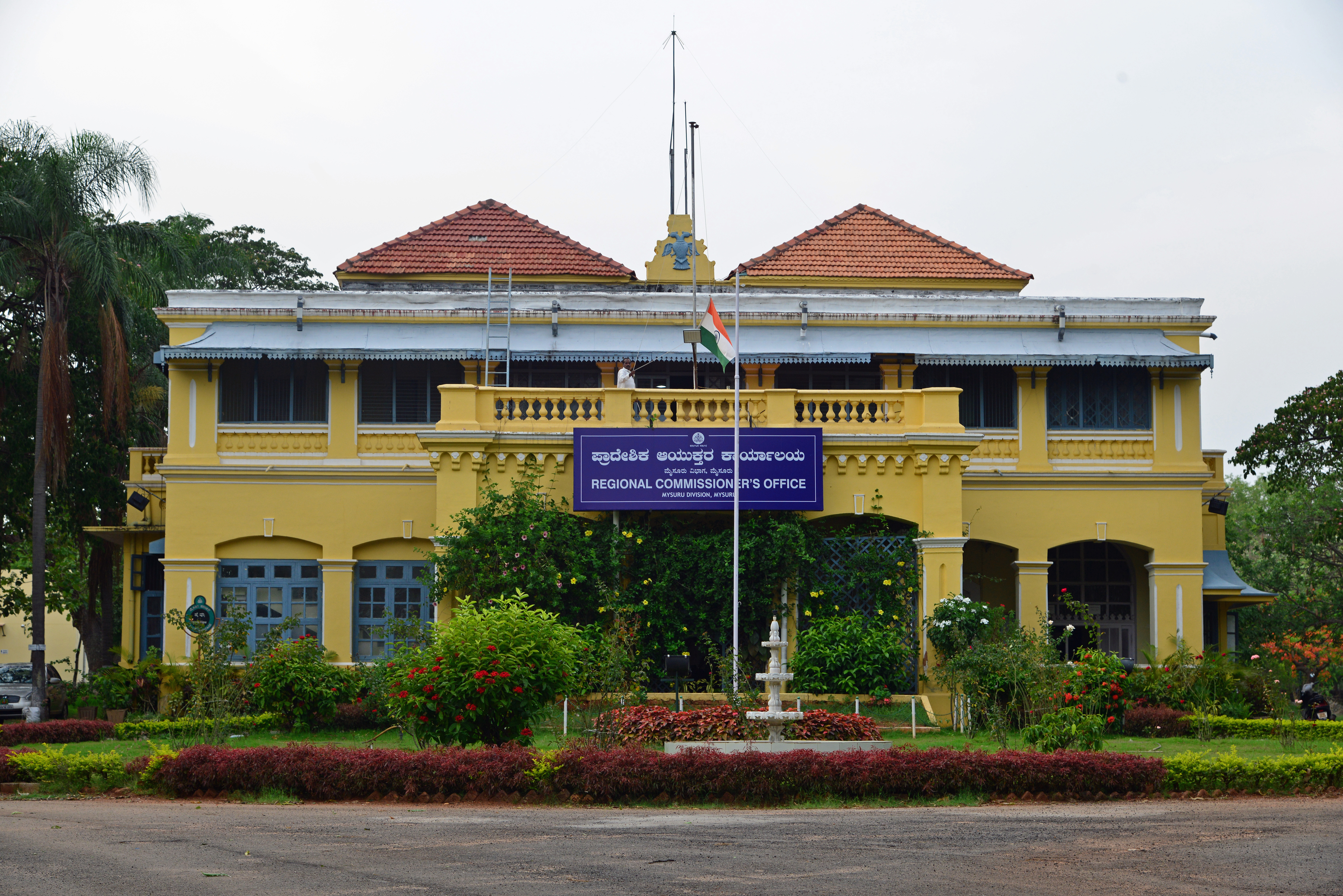
- Office of the Regional Commissioner, Mysore; headquarters of Mysore division

- Mysuru administrative division; Mysore (inside the dotted Mysore district) is the division's headquarters
- Country: India
- State: Karnataka
- Headquarters: Mysore

Area
  - Total: 43,503 km^{2} (16,797 sq mi)

Population (2011)
  - Total: 12,563,598
  - Density: 288.80/km^{2} (747.98/sq mi)
- Website: https://rcmysore.gov.in/

Mysore division, officially Mysuru division, is an administrative division in the southern Indian state of Karnataka. It is one of four administrative divisions in Karnataka, the others being Bangalore division, Belagavi division, and Kalaburagi division. Mysore division comprises eight districts of Karnataka, namely, Chamarajanagar, Chikmagalur, Dakshina Kannada, Hassan, Kodagu, Mandya, Mysore and Udupi district. The city of Mysore is the administrative headquarters of the division. Mysore division covers parts of historical Old Mysore region and southern part of Coastal Karnataka.The total area of the division is 43,503 sq.km. The total population as of 2011 census is 12,563,598.

== Administration ==
A Regional Commissioner, is head of every administrative division. The role of the regional commissioner includes maintaining staff and human resources for revenue department, maintaining revenue records, inspection of subordinate offices, natural disaster and drought relief, release grants to District offices, Sub-divisions and Taluk offices, preparation of Annual Budget, periodic review of government programs and more. High View building in Vinoba Road, Mysore houses the office of the regional commissioner. The division consists of 8 districts covering 55 taluks with more taluks to be formed, as of 2020.

== Cities ==
Important cities in the division include:

- Mysuru
- Mangaluru
- Hassan
- Udupi
- Mandya
- Chikkamagaluru
- Kadur
- Chamarajanagar
- Kundapura
- Madikeri

Mysore is the largest city in the region followed by Mangalore.

== Regions ==
The Mysore division can be divided into 3 unofficial regions. The districts of Mysore, Chamarajanagar, Mandya, Hassan and Chikmagalur are part of Old Mysore region, districts of Dakshina Kannada and Udupi are part of Tulu language speaking Coastal Karnataka region and Kodagu district was part of the erstwhile Part-C state of Coorg. Part of the region falls under the Malnad area of Karnataka while the other part falls under the Kaveri river basin.

== Economy ==
Mysore and Mangalore are the major economic hubs of the region. Tourism and IT is the major industry in Mysore. The city attracted about 3.15 million tourists in 2010. Mysore has traditionally been home to industries such as weaving, sandalwood carving, bronze work and the production of lime and salt. It has many other big IT Companies the city like Infosys and Wipro.Nanjangud industrial area hosts a number of industries like AT&S India Pvt Ltd, Nestle India ltd, Reid and Taylor, Jubiliant, TVS, Asian Paints. Nanjangud Industrial area also boasts being 2nd highest VAT / Sales Taxpayer which is more than ₹4 billion (US$42 million) after Peenya which is in state capital Bangalore. JK Tyre has its manufacturing facility in Mysore. The New Mangalore Port is India's seventh-largest container port. It handles 75 per cent of India's coffee exports and the bulk of its cashew nuts. Mangalore's major chemical industries include BASF, Mangalore Refinery and Petrochemicals Limited (MRPL), Mangalore Chemicals and Fertilizers (MCF), Kudremukh Iron Ore Company Ltd. (KIOCL), Hindustan Petroleum Corporation Ltd. (HPCL), Bharat Petroleum Corporation Ltd. (BPCL), Indian Oil Corporation Limited (IOCL), Total Oil India Limited and Hindustan Unilever. Other important economic hubs include Mandya and Hassan.

== Transport ==
=== Road ===
The division of Mysore contains some important national highways passing through it such as National Highway 275 which includes Bangalore-Mysore Expressway which is under construction., National Highway 766 (India), National Highway 150A (India), National Highway 73 (India) and National Highway 66 (India) are some major National Highways passing through the division. Karnataka State Road Transport Corporation (KSRTC) provides bus transport for the region.

=== Railway ===
Majority of the division is under Mysore railway division of South Western Railway zone. The parts of Coastal Karnataka comes under Konkan Railway zone. Major railway stations are Mysore Junction, Mangalore Junction, Mangalore Central, Arsikere Junction, Hassan Junction, Kadur Junction railway station, Birur Junction, Mandya, Chamrajnagar, and Chikkamagaluru.

=== Air ===
Mangalore International Airport is the only international airport located in the division. Mysore Airport is a major domestic airport. Hassan Airport is under construction.

=== Sea ===
New Mangalore Port is the main and only port of the division.

== Gallery ==
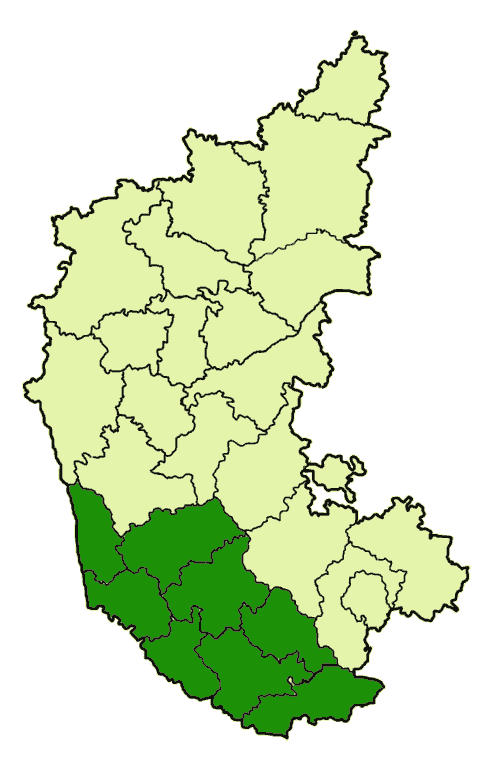

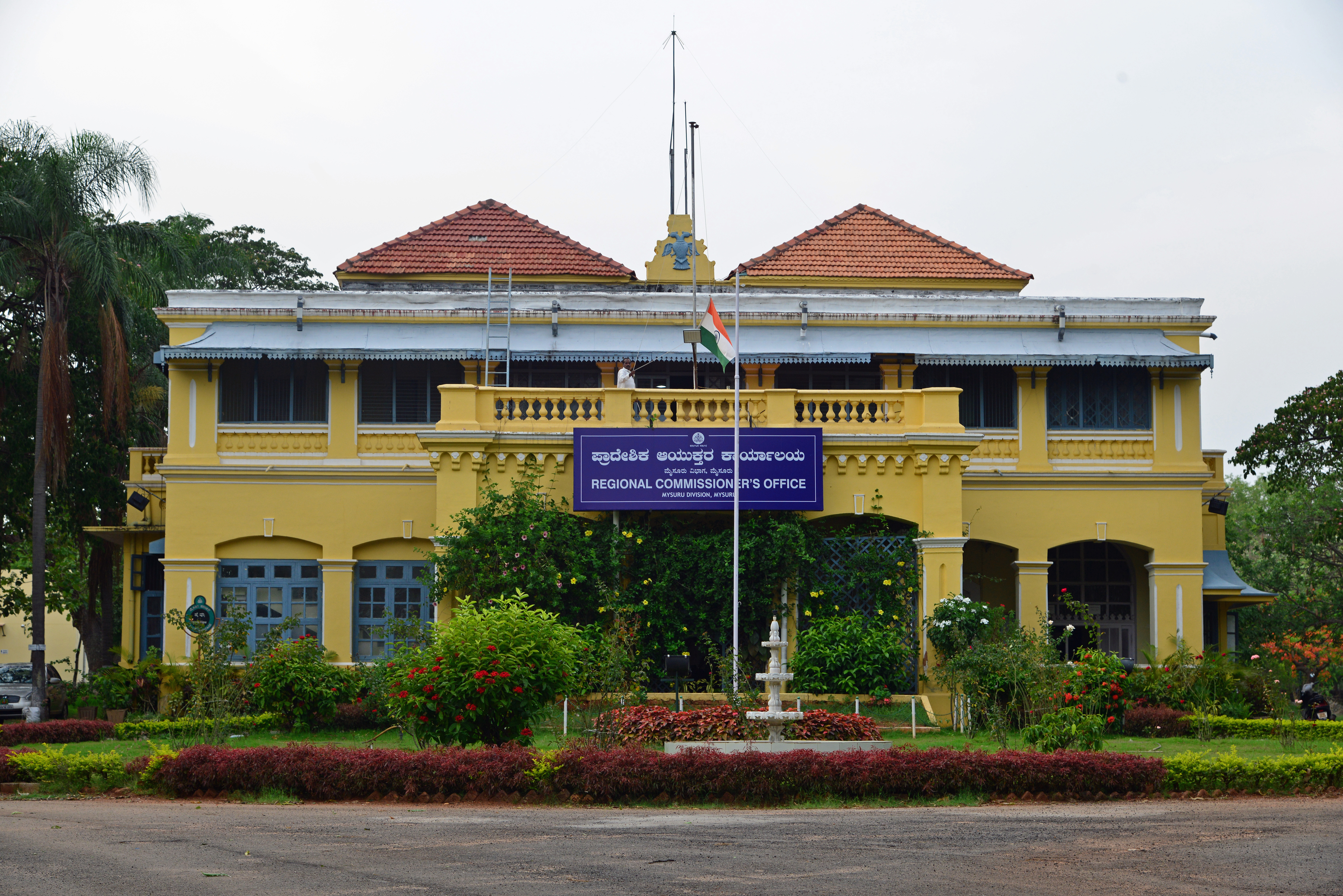

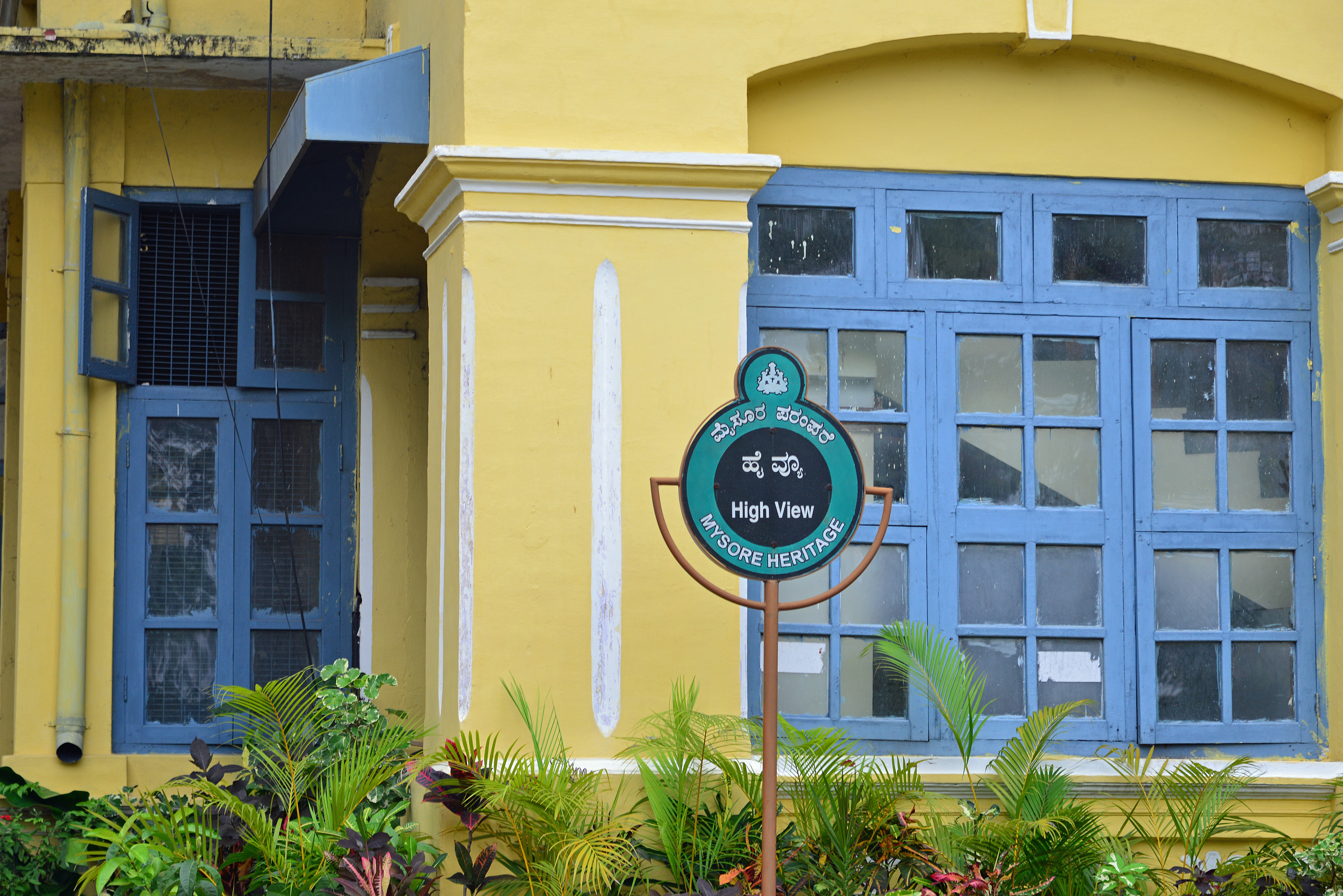

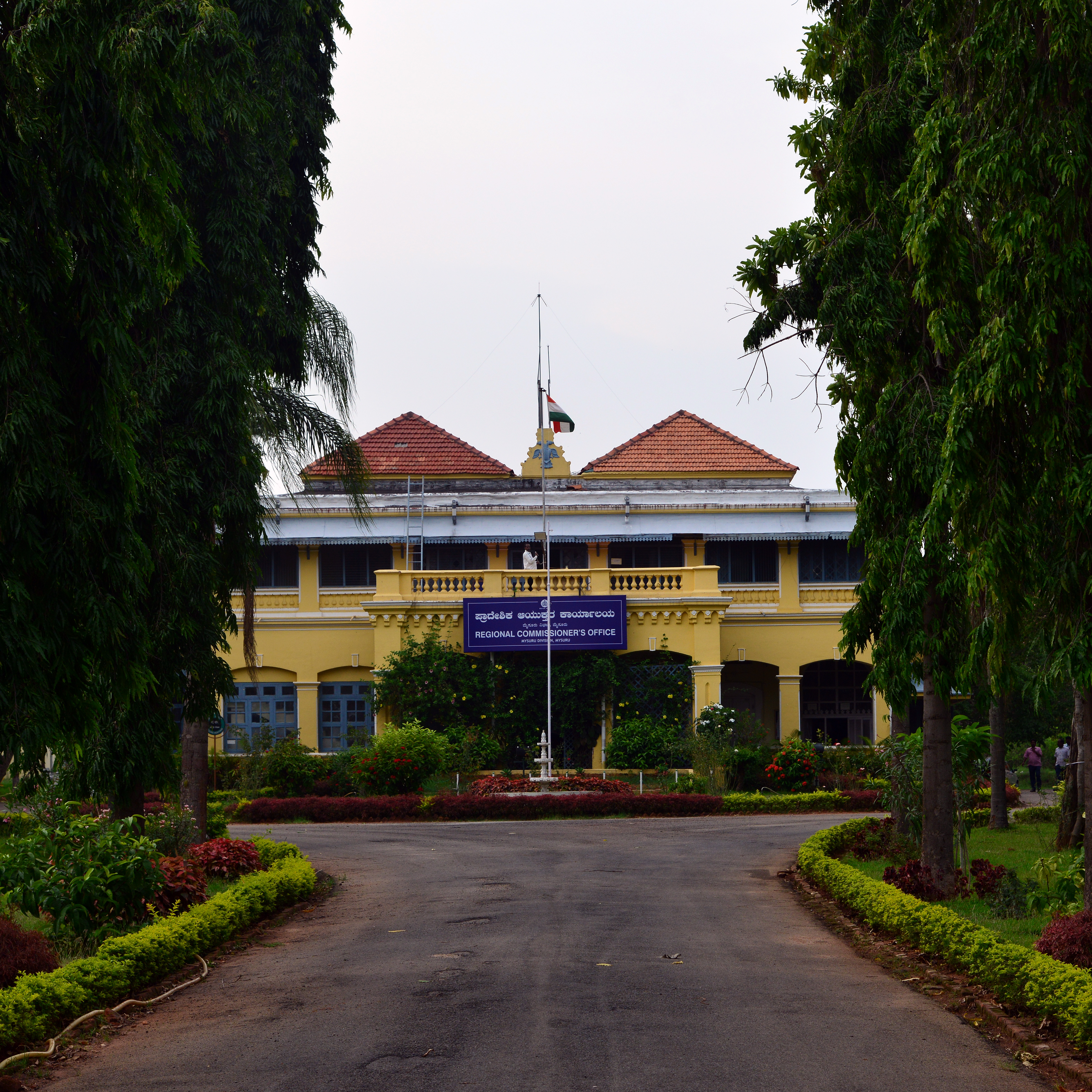

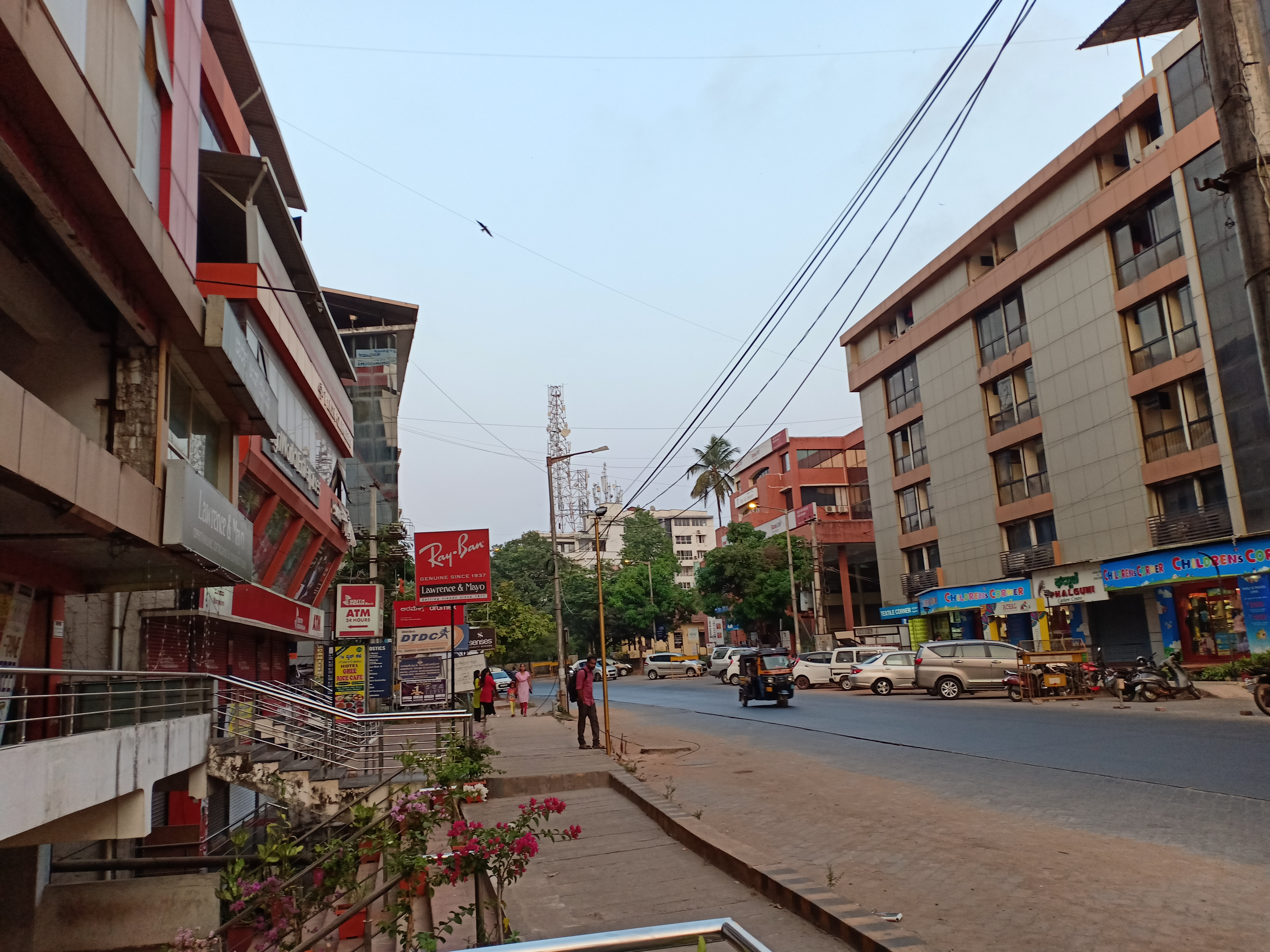

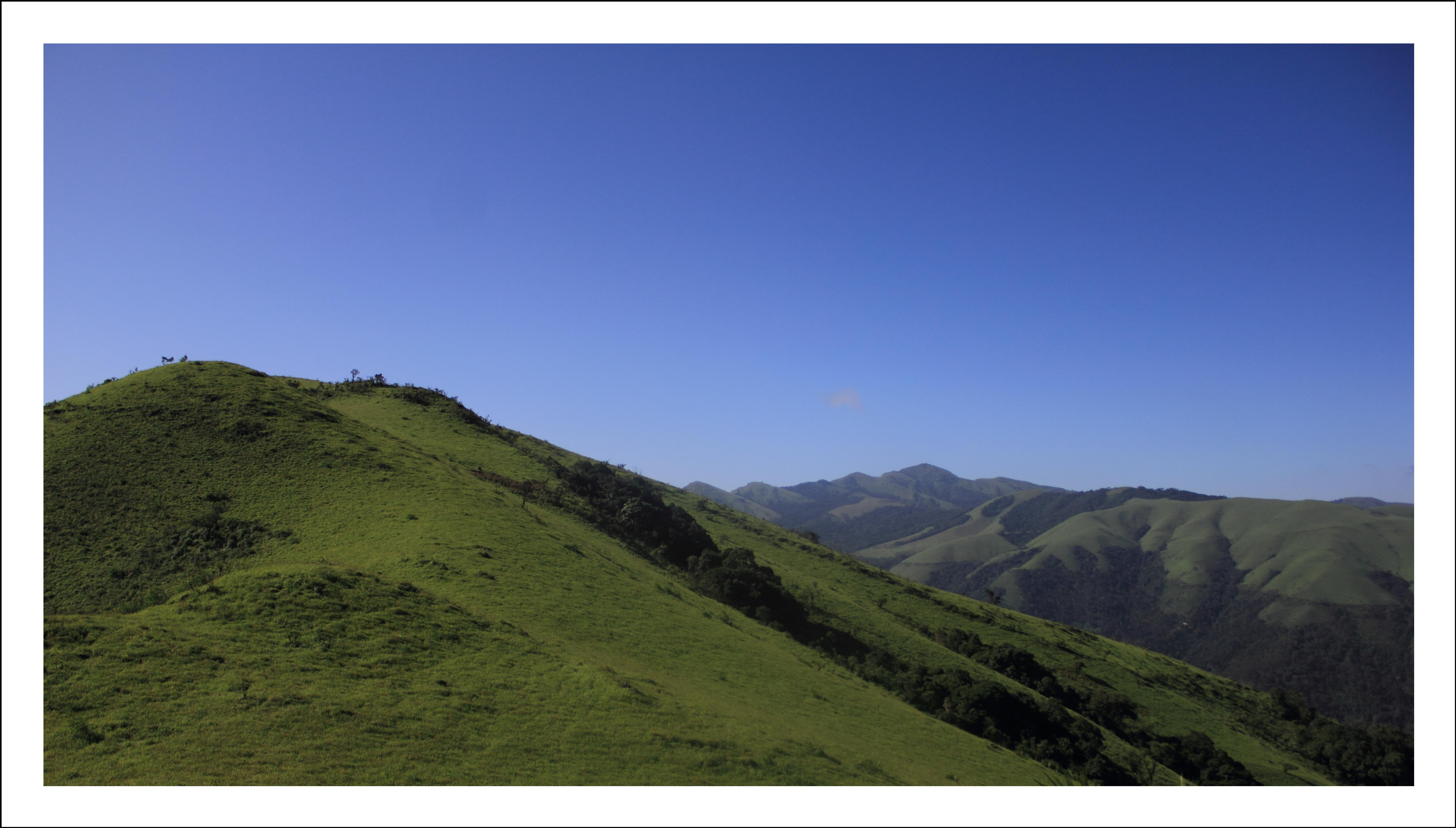

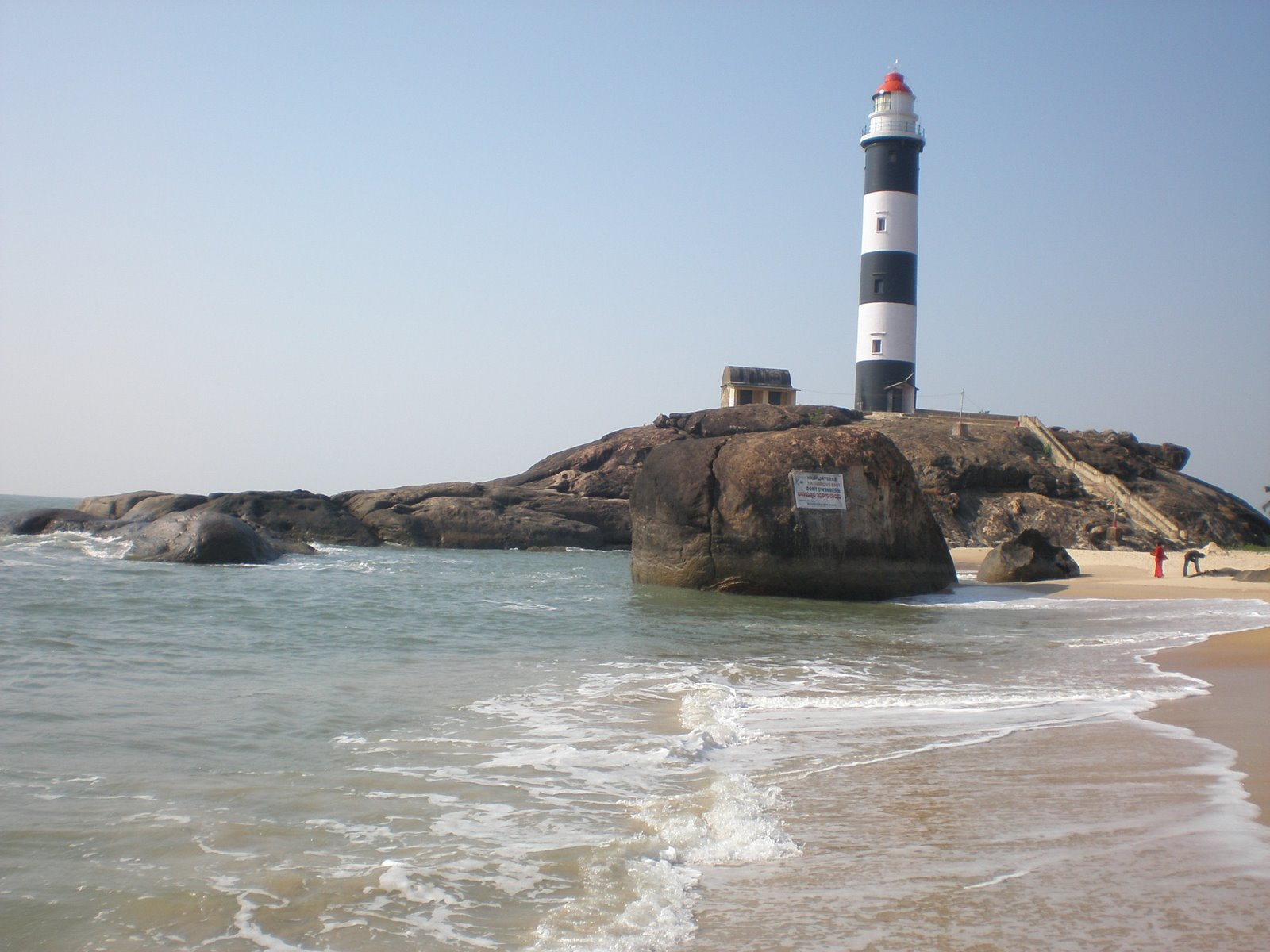

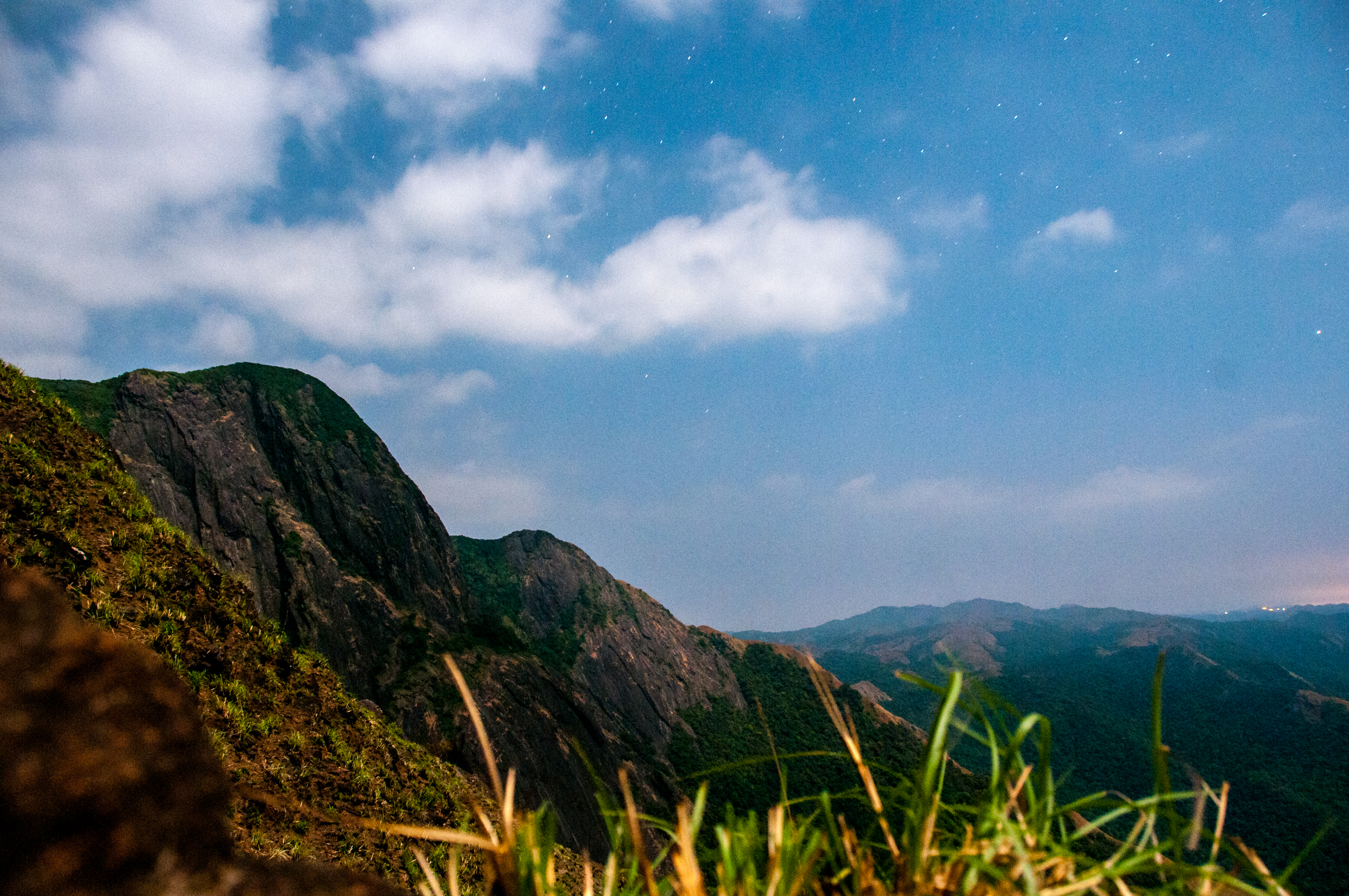

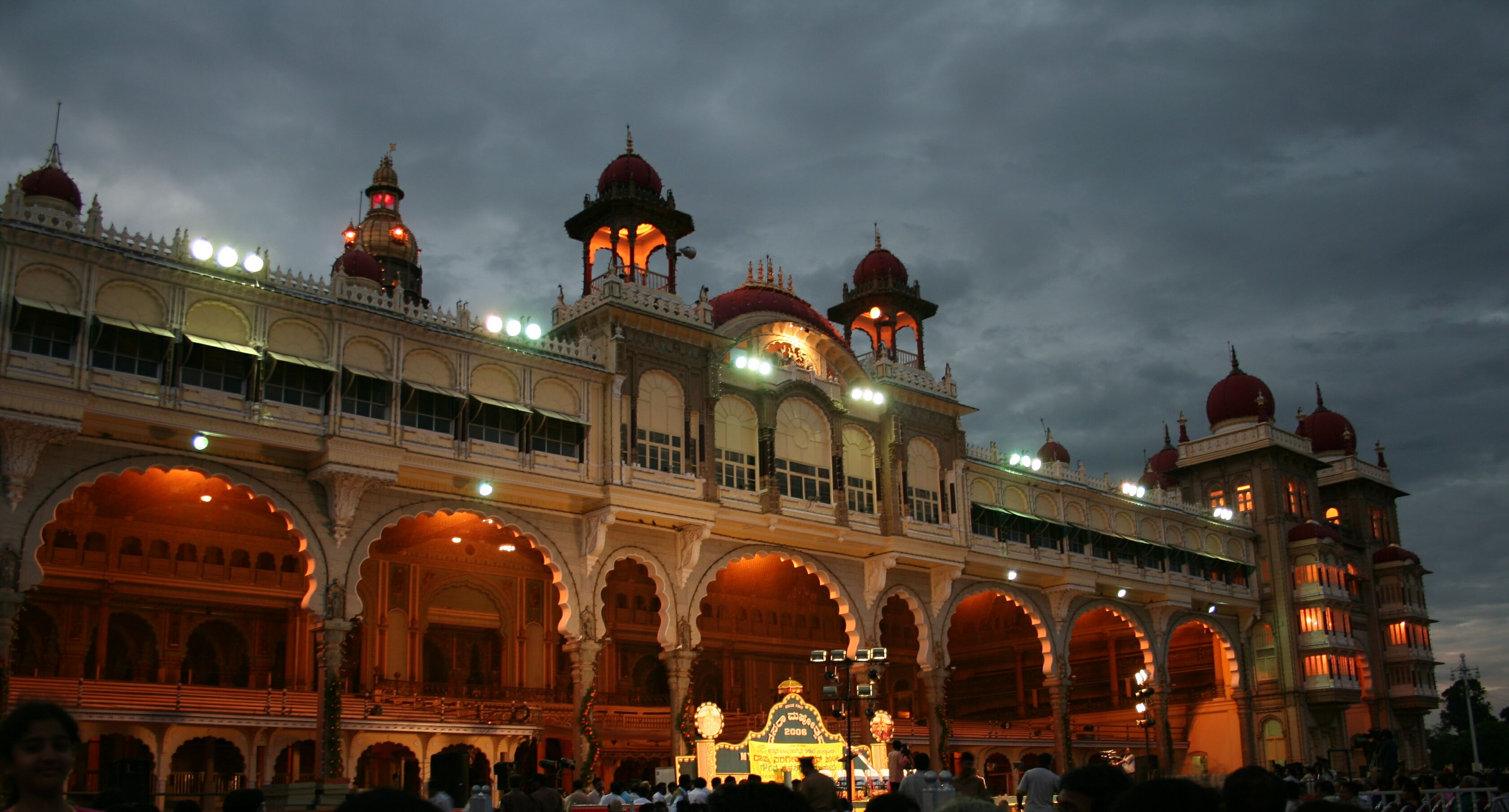

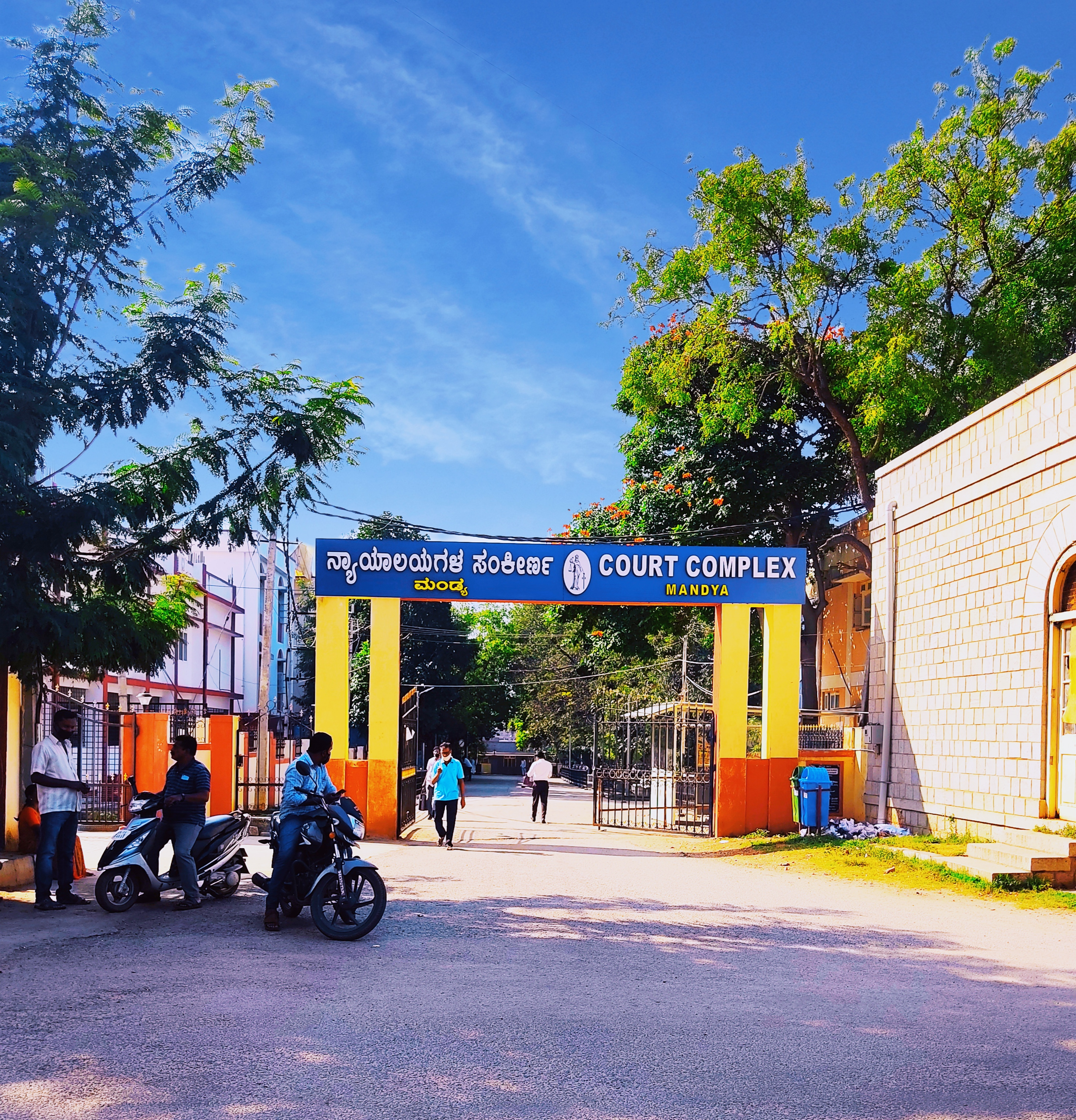

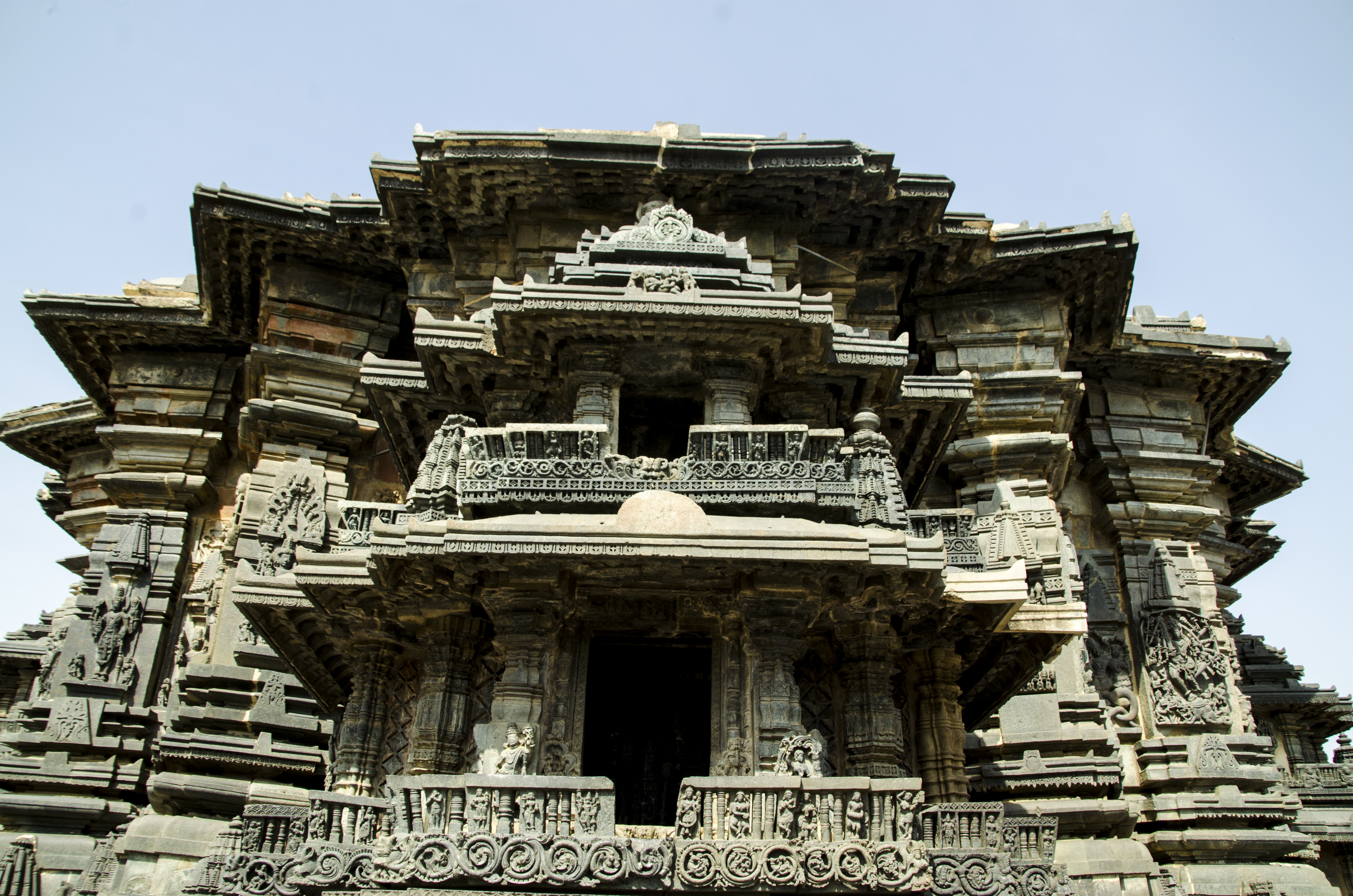

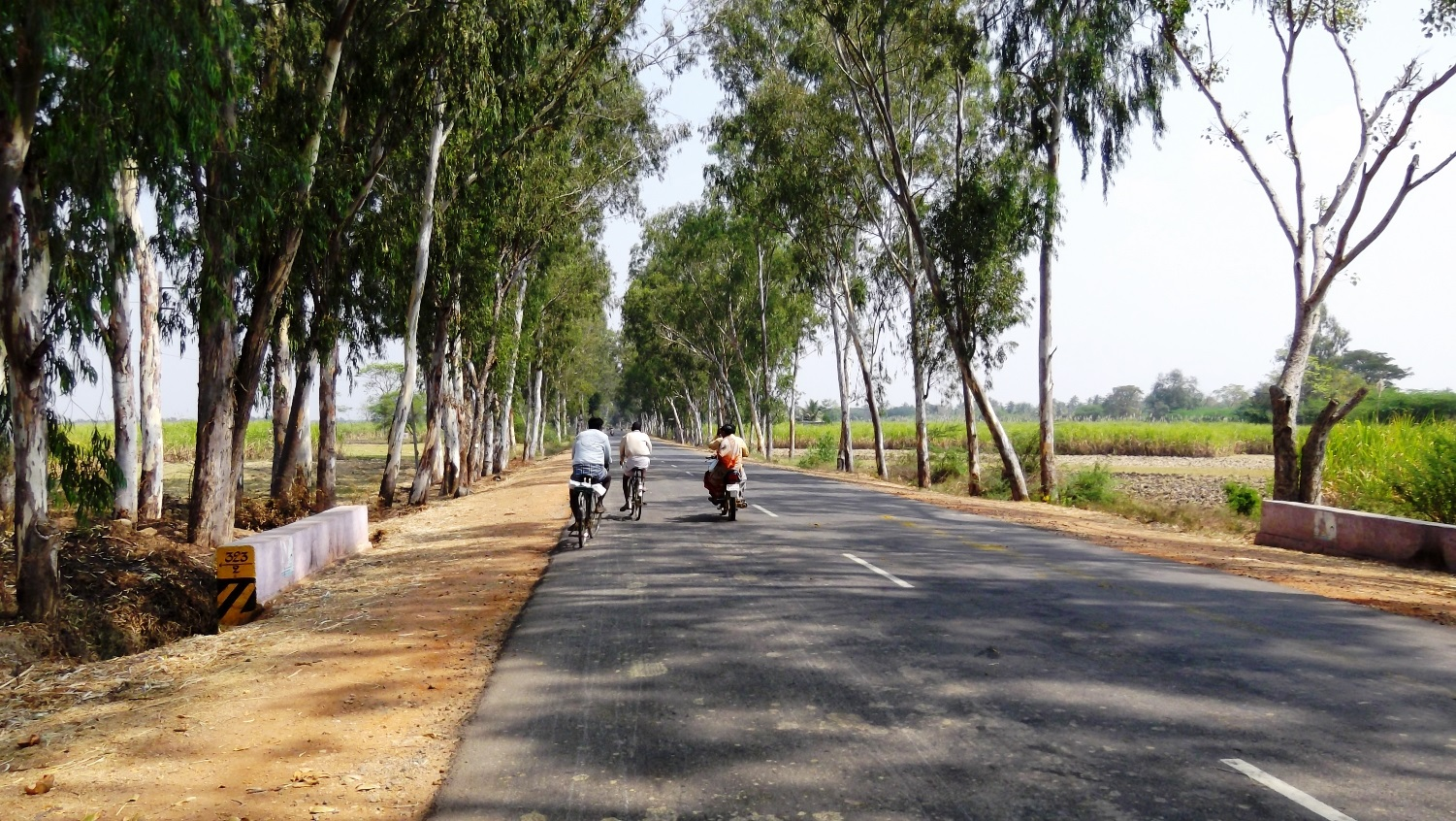

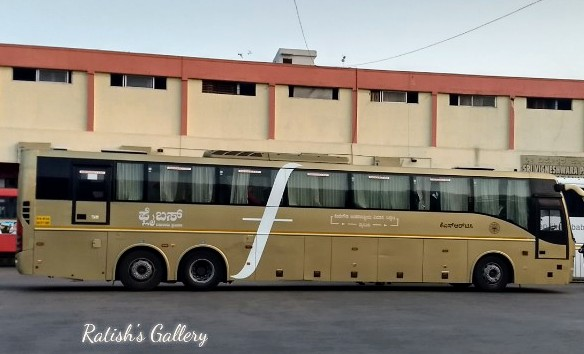

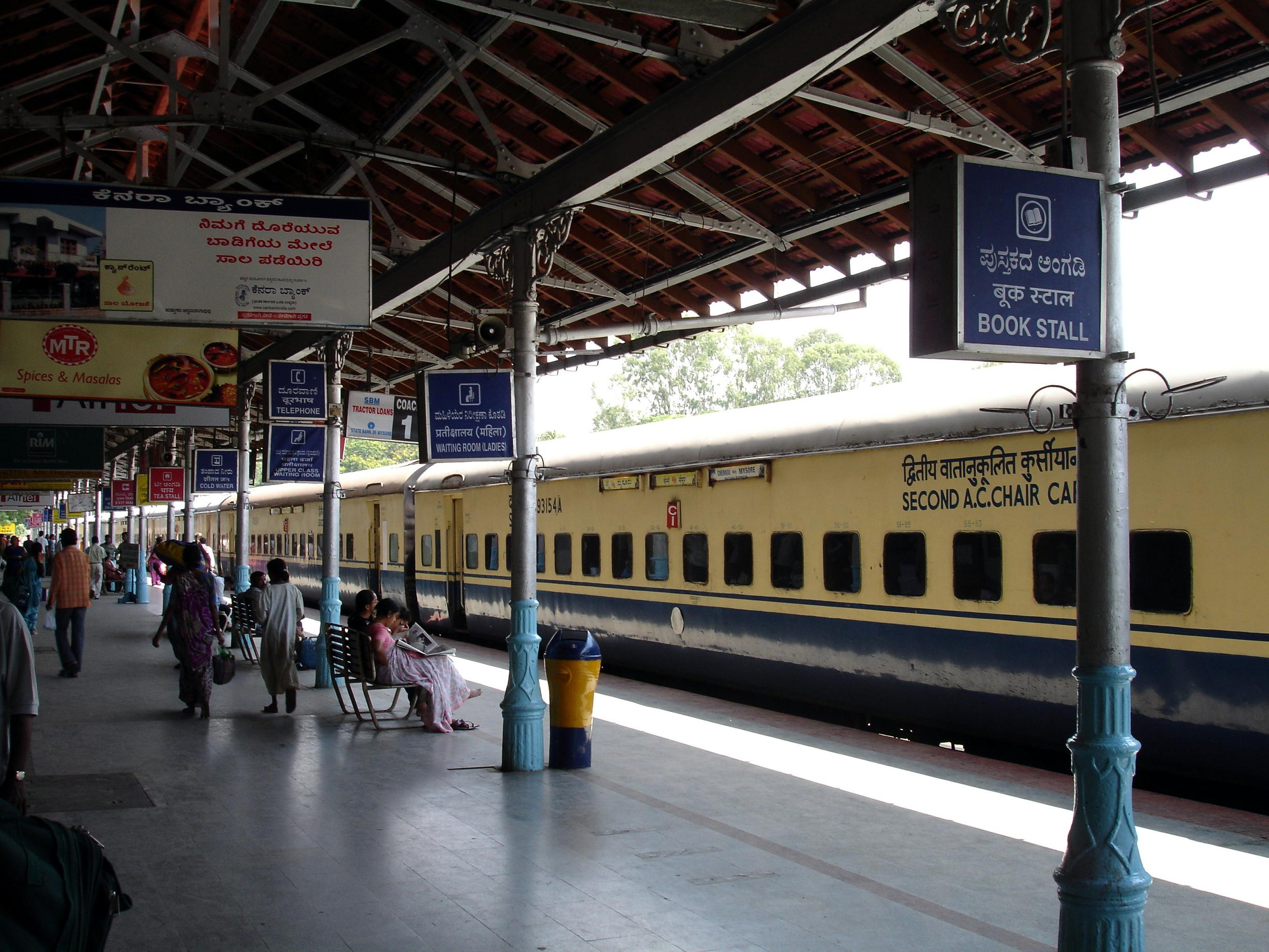

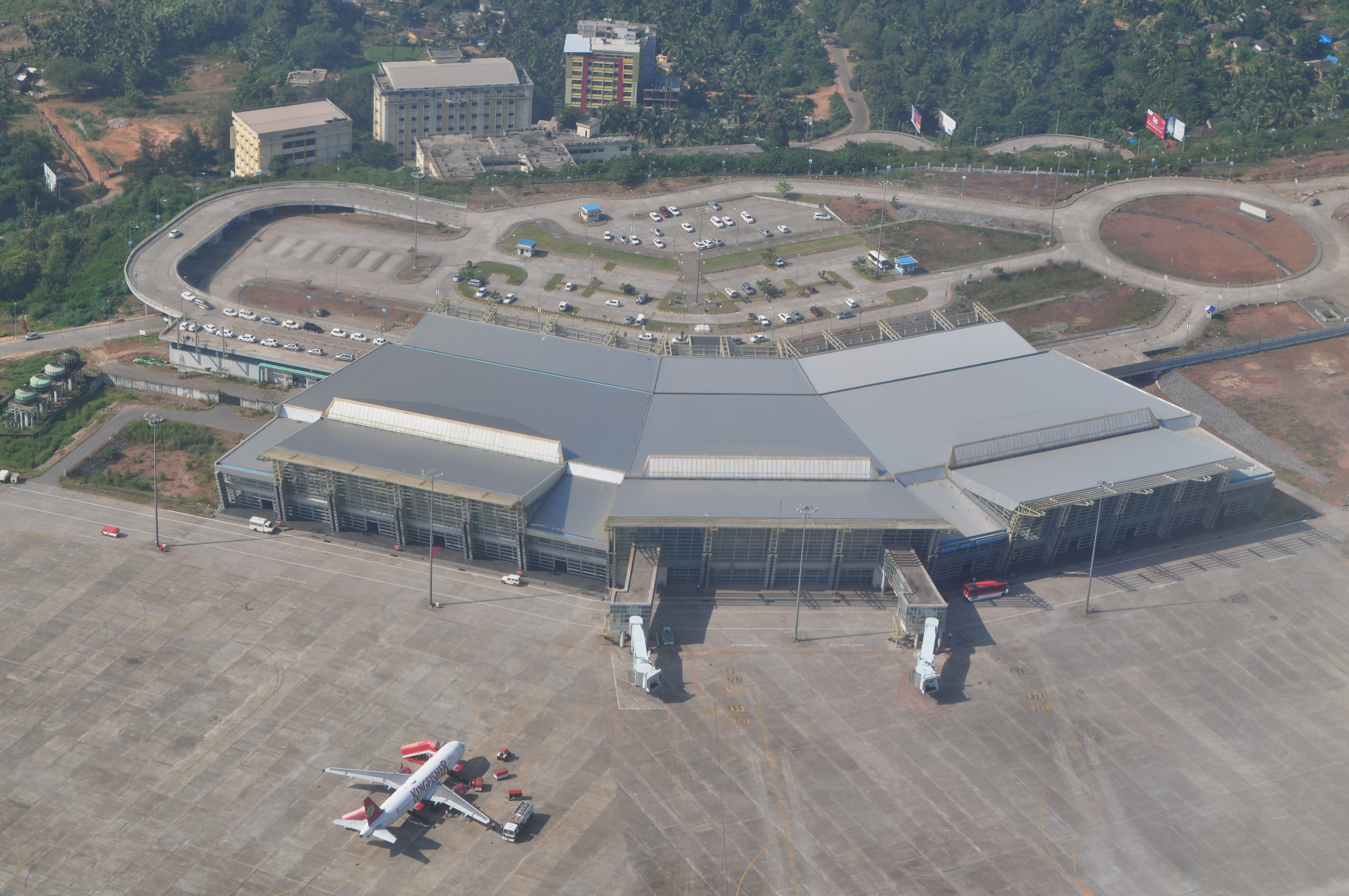

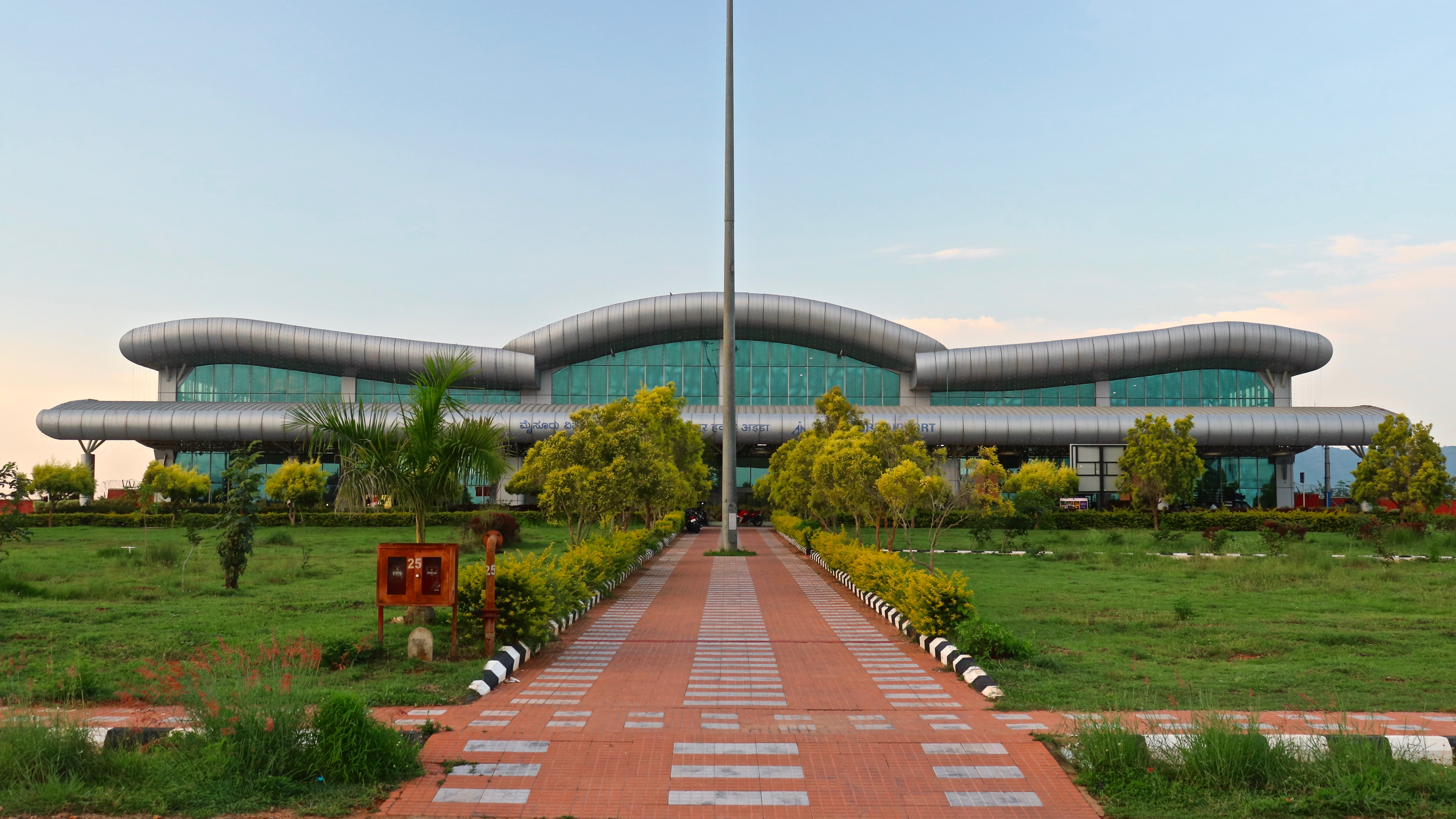

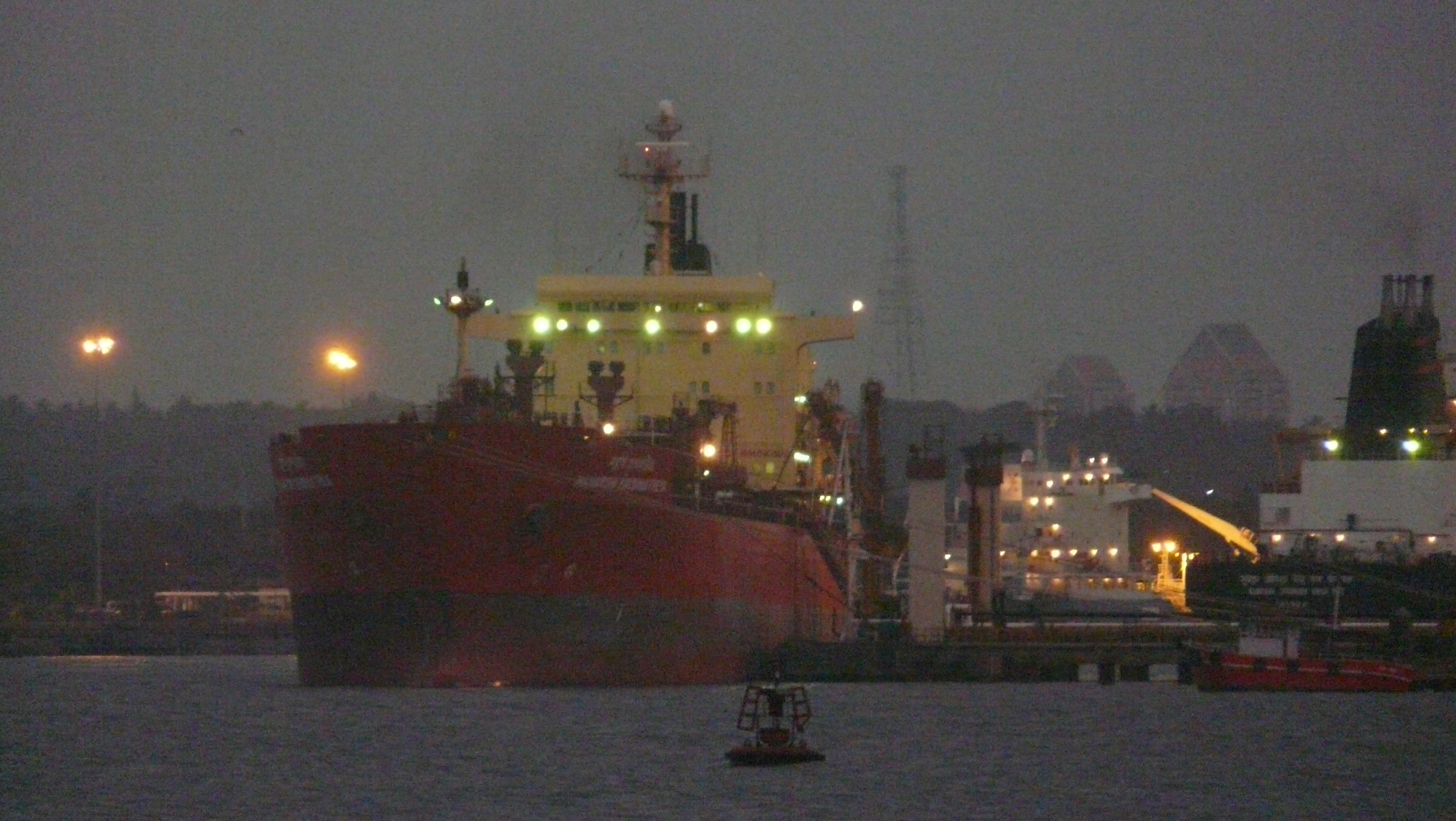

== See also ==
- Administrative divisions of India
- States and union territories of India
- Districts of Karnataka
- Deccan Plateau
