= Sadali =

Sadali may refer to:

- Sadali, Chikkaballapura, hobli headquarters in Chikballapur district, Karnataka, India
- Sadali, Sardinia, commune in the Metropolitan City of Cagliari, Sardinia, Italy
- Ahmad Sadali (1924-1987), Indonesian painter and art lecturer
