= Kalasapura, Chikmagalur =

Kalasapura
- Village
- Kalasapura
- Location in Karnataka, India
- Coordinates: 13.277295°N 75.934740°E
- Country: India
- State: Karnataka
- District: Chikmagalur
- Taluk: Chikmagalur

Government
  - Body: Grama Panchayath

Area
  - Total: 10.65 km^{2} (4.11 sq mi)
- Elevation: 890 m (2,920 ft)

Population (2011)
  - Total: 3,836
  - Density: 360.2/km^{2} (932.9/sq mi)

Languages
  - Official: Kannada
- Time zone: UTC+5:30 (IST)
- PIN: 577146
- Telephone code: 08262
- Vehicle registration: KA-18

Kalasapura is a village in Chikkamagaluru taluk in the Chikkamagaluru district of Karnataka, India. It is also one of the most populous village in the district.

It lies on Chikmagalur-Javagal main road. No major highways pass through the village. It is located 22 km southeast of its district headquarter Chikmagalur and 225 km from state capital Bengaluru.

There is no railway connectivity to the village. The nearest major railway junction is Arasikere Junction.
