= Arasikere, Tumkur =

Arasikere Arsikere
- village
- Location in Karnataka, India Arasikere (India)
- Coordinates: 14.084998°N 77.041111°E
- Country: India
- State: Karnataka
- District: Tumkur
- Taluks: Pavagada

Area
  - Total: 21 km^{2} (8.1 sq mi)
- Elevation: 678 m (2,224 ft)

Population (2011)
  - Total: 3,661
  - Density: 170/km^{2} (450/sq mi)

Languages
  - Official: Kannada
- Time zone: UTC+5:30 (IST)
- Postal code: 572116
- Vehicle registration: KA 64

Arasikere is a village in Pavagada Taluk in Tumkur District of Karnataka, India. It belongs to Bangalore Division . It is located 97 km towards North from the District headquarters Tumakuru. 24 km from Pavagada and 161 km from State capital Bangalore.

Arasikere Pin code is 572116 and postal head office is Channakeshavapura .

KT Halli (8 km), Vadanakallu (12 km), Doddabanagere (13 km), Gujjanadu (14 km), Rangasamudra (15 km) are the nearby Villages to Arasikere. Arasikere is surrounded by Gudibanda Taluk towards South, Pavagada Taluk towards East, Kundurpi Taluk towards North, Rolla Taluk towards South.

Pavagada, Sira, Madhugiri, Kalyandurg are the nearby Cities to Arasikere.

This Place is in the border of the Tumkur District and Anantapur District. Anantapur District Roddam is East towards this place. It is near to the Andhra Pradesh State Border.

== Arasikere 2011 Census Details ==
Arasikere Local Language is Kannada. Arasikere Village Total population is 3661 and number of houses are 823. Female Population is 49.8%. Village literacy rate is 65.5% and the Female Literacy rate is 28.3%. Population Census Parameter Census Data Total Population 3661 Total No of Houses 823 Female Population % 49.8% ( 1823) Total Literacy rate % 65.5% ( 2397) Female Literacy rate 28.3% ( 1036) Scheduled Tribes Population % 11.0% ( 404) Scheduled Caste Population % 17.5% ( 640) Working Population % 54.1% Child(0 -6) Population by 2011 351 Girl Child(0 -6) Population % by 2011 43.0% ( 151)

== Politics in Arasikere ==
JD(S), BJP, INC are the major political parties in this area.

== Transport ==
=== By Rail ===
There is no railway station near to Arasikere in less than 10 km. Hindupur Railway Station (near to Hindupur), Malugur Railway Station (near to Hindupur) are the Railway stations reachable from near by towns.

=== By Road ===
Pavagada, Hindupur are the nearby by towns to Arasikere having road connectivity to Arasikere

== See also ==
- Tumkur
- Districts of Karnataka
