= Mysuru–Arsikere Passenger =

Train in India

Arsikere − Mysore Passenger
Overview
- Service type: Passenger
- Current operator: South Western Railway zone

Route
- Termini: Arsikere Junction (ASK); Mysore Junction (MYS)
- Stops: 19
- Distance travelled: 145 km (90 mi)
- Average journey time: 3h 35m
- Service frequency: Daily (Note: Runs seven days in a week for every direction.)
- Train number: 56267/56268

On-board services
- Classes: Sleeper class, General Unreserved
- Seating arrangements: No
- Sleeping arrangements: Yes
- Catering facilities: On-board catering E-catering
- Observation facilities: ICF coach
- Entertainment facilities: No
- Baggage facilities: No
- Other facilities: Below the seats

Technical
- Rolling stock: 2
- Track gauge: 1,676 mm (5 ft 6 in)
- Operating speed: 40 km/h (25 mph), including halts

The Arsikere−Mysore Passenger is a Passenger train belonging to South Western Railway zone that runs between Arsikere Junction and Mysore Junction in India. It is currently being operated with 56267/56268 train numbers on a weekly basis.

== Service ==
The 56267/Arsikere–Mysuru Passenger has an average speed of 38 km/h and covers 168 km in 4h 25m. The 56268/Mysuru–Arsikere Passenger has an average speed of 40 km/h and covers 168 km in 4h 10m.

== Route and halts ==
The important halts of the train are:

- Arsikere Junction
- Hassan Junction
- Mandagere
- Birahalli
- Akkihebbalu
- Krishnarajanagara
- Dornahalli
- Krishnarajasagar
- Mysore Junction

== Coach composition ==
The train has standard ICF rakes with a maximum speed of 110 km/h. The train consists of 13 coaches:

- 1 Sleeper coach
- 10 General Unreserved
- 2 Seating cum Luggage Rake

== Traction ==
Both trains are hauled by a Krishnarajapuram Loco Shed-based WDP-4 diesel locomotive from Arsikere to Mysore and vice versa.

== See also ==
- Mysore Junction railway station
- Arsikere Junction railway station
- Jolarpettai–Bangalore City Express
- Night Queen Passenger
- Bangarapet–Marikuppam Passenger
