= Sadali, Chikkaballapura =

Sadali
- town
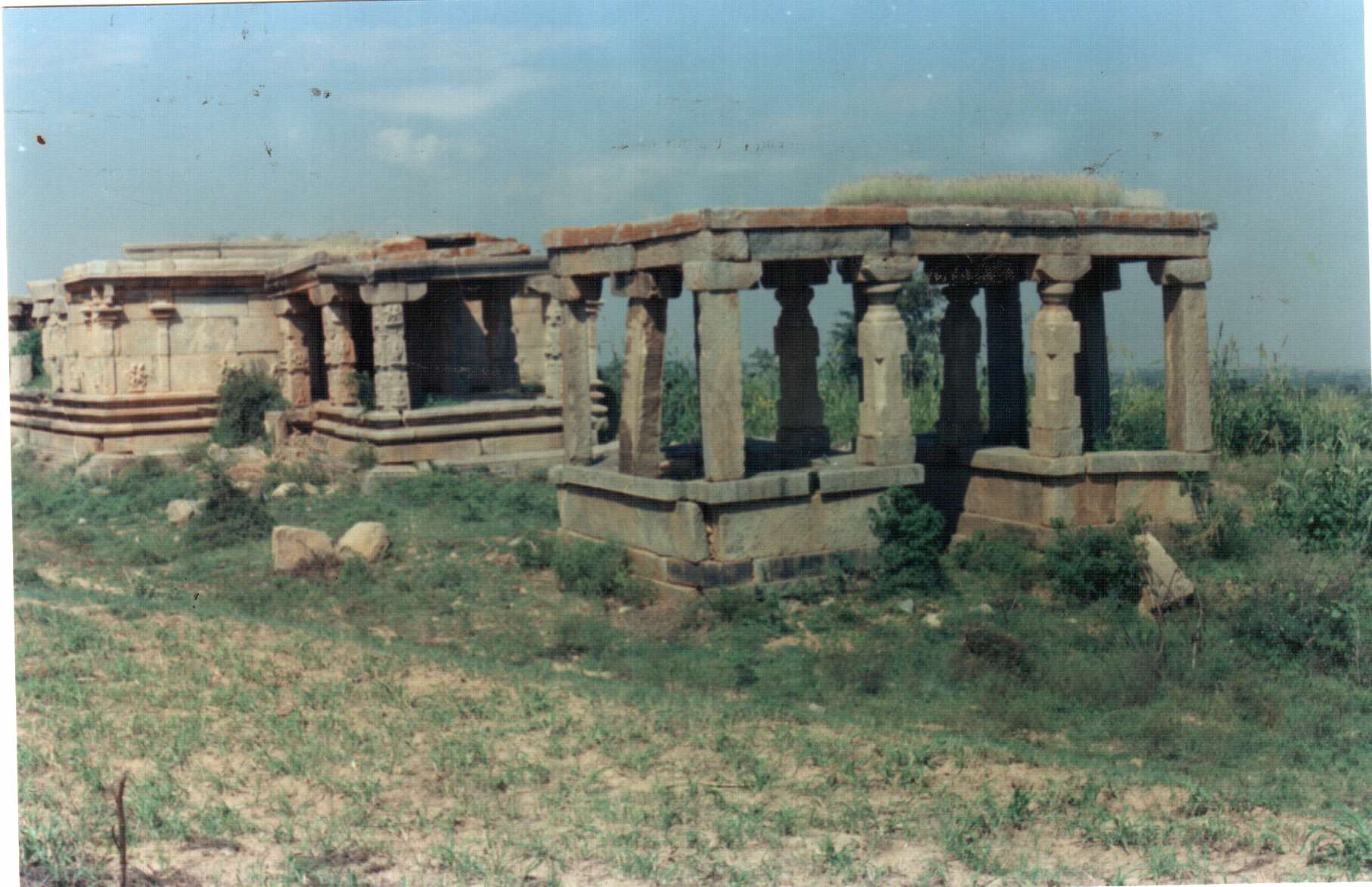
- Front view of Channakesava temple

- Location in Karnataka, India
- Coordinates: 13°38′N 77°52′E
- Country: India
- State: Karnataka
- District: Chikballapur

Government
  - Body: Mandal Panchayat

Languages
  - Official: Kannada
- Time zone: UTC+5:30 (IST)
- PIN: 562104
- Nearest city: Bangalore
- Lok Sabha constituency: Chikballapur
- Vidhan Sabha constituency: Sidlaghatta
- Civic agency: Mandal Panchayat

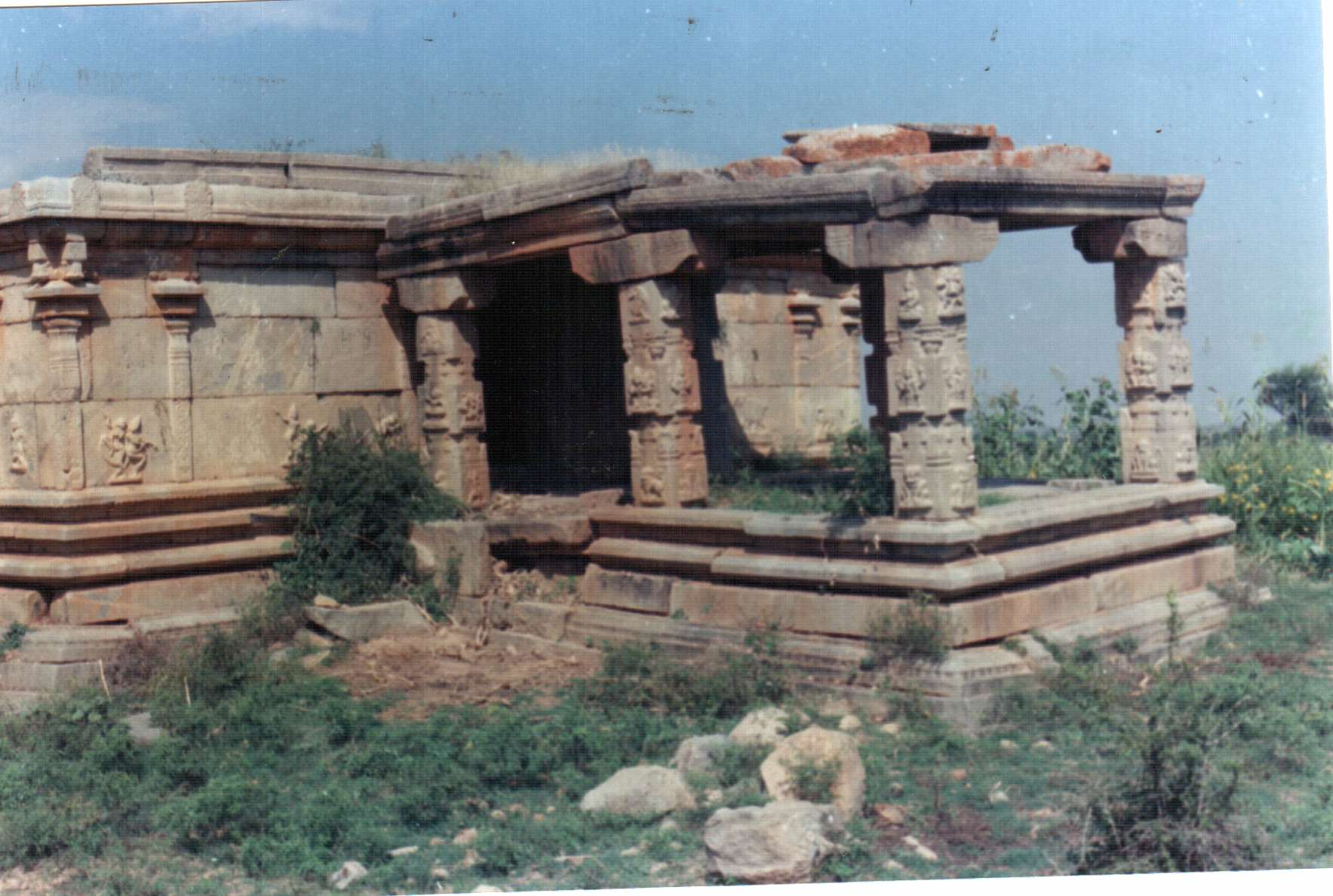
Closer view from same side

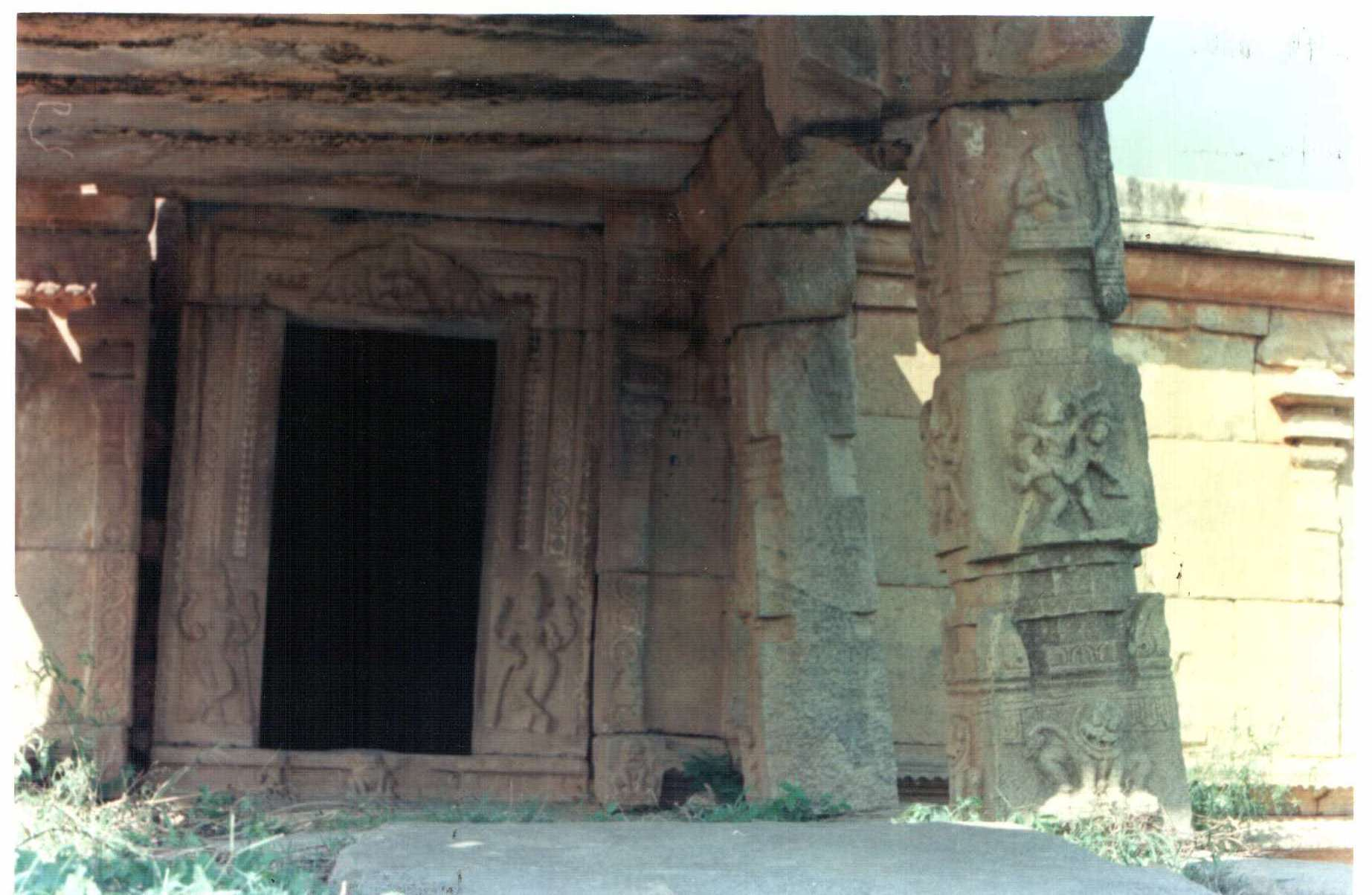
Entrance

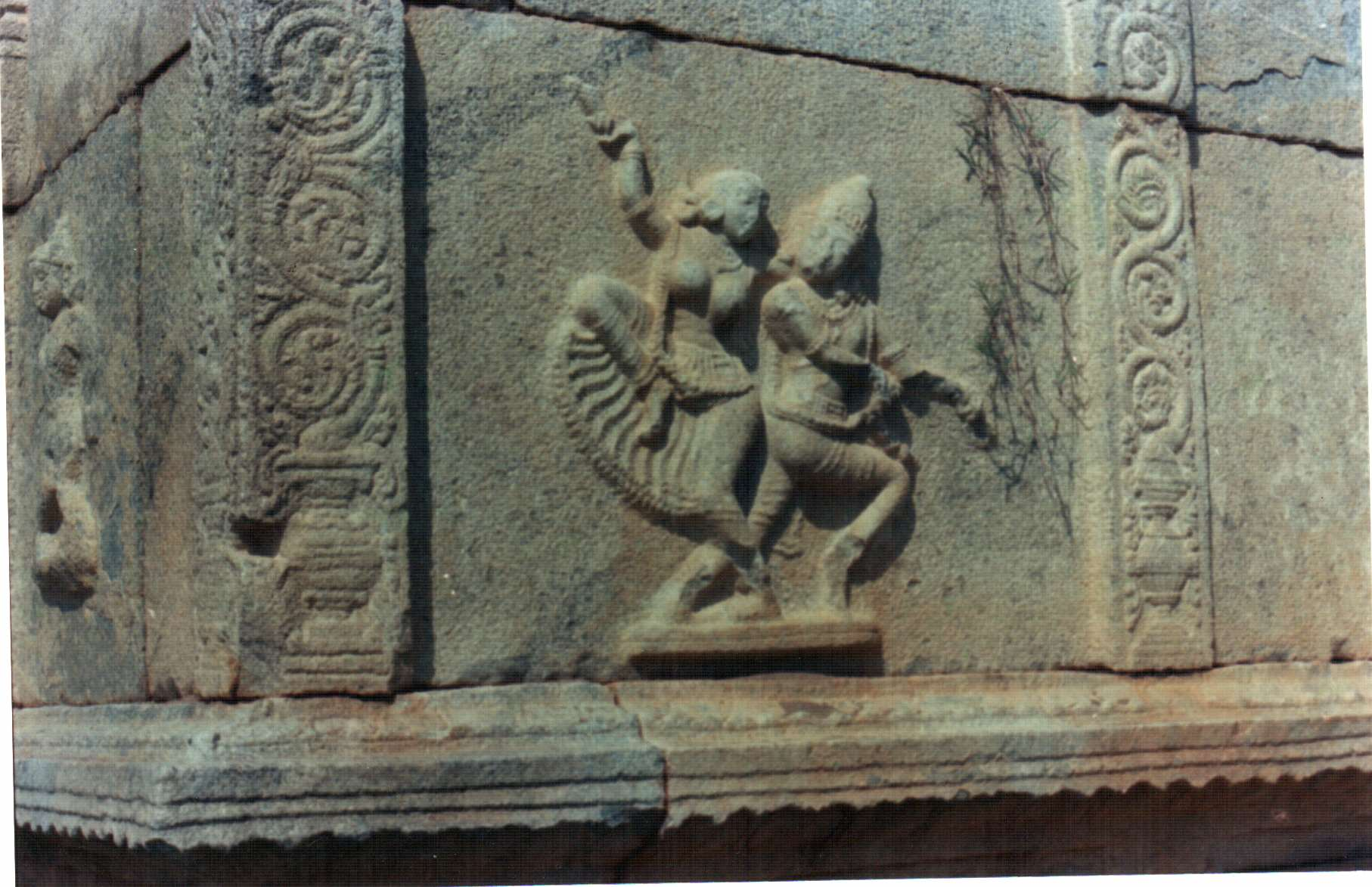
Dancers

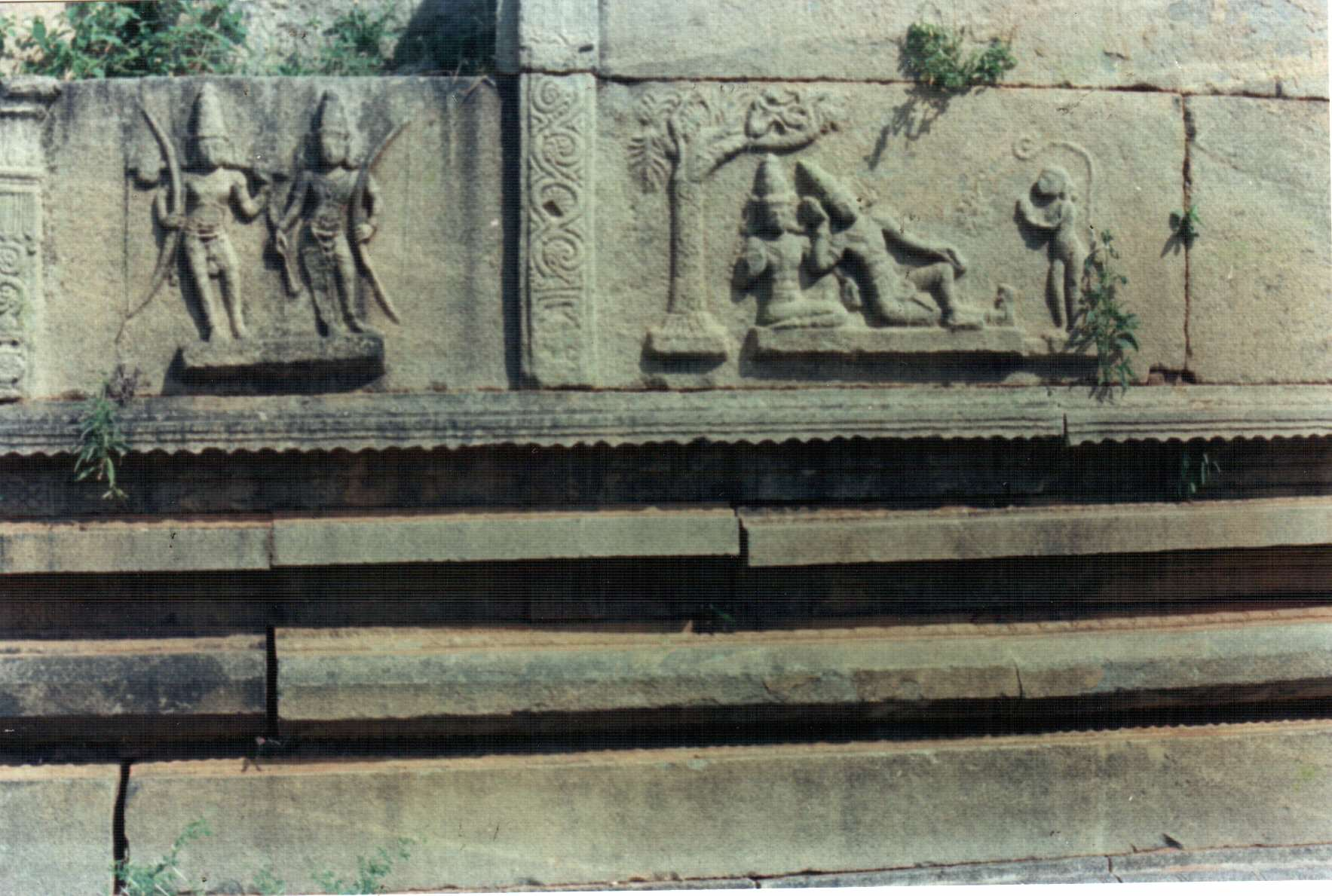
Rama Lakshmana with Hamuman

Sadali is a hobli (group of villages) headquarters in Chikballapur district, Karnataka, India. It is located at a distance of about 100 km from Bangalore. It is equidistant from five taluk headquarters: Shidlaghatta, Chintamani, Bagepalli, Gudibanda and Chikballapur.

Sadali has mythological, historical and semi-historical folklore links.

== Geography ==
Sadali in Sidlagatta Taluk, is a village north of Sidlagatta town on the road to Bagepalli. It is surrounded by small hillocks. It has two big tanks built by the kings of erstwhile Kingdom of Mysore.

== Mythology ==
Tradition has it that it was founded by Sahadeva, the youngest of the Pandava brothers, and hence was called Sahadevapatna/Sahadevapura. It was later abbreviated as Sahadevapalli, Sadahalli and now Sadali.

== History ==
It was one of the provinces under Vijayanagara Empire called the Sadali Kingdom, which seems to have included Chikkaballapur and the adjoining area; this was in Naganna Odeyar's charge under Bukka in 1371 AD. Naganna Odeyar and his son Depanna Odeyar figure prominently in connection with Sadali between 1370 and 1385. Their exact relation with the ruling family of Vijayanagara is not known.

In the historical period, the village changed hands several times. Khasim Khan, a Military Commandant of Moghul Empire conquered this area and it was annexed to the Sira Suba (Province of Sira) and bestowed as a Jagir on two Muslim chiefs. (One of them was Fateh Mohamad, father of Hyder Ali). To prevent its falling into the hands of Nawab of Cuddapah, they privately disposed of it about 1759 AD to Dodda Baire Gauda of Chikballapur and later it was seized by Hyder Ali, father of Tippu Sultan in 1762 AD. Dodda Baire Gauda was a descendant of Rana Baire Gauda who ruled Avathi. This dynasty was responsible for development of Chikballapur, Doddaballapur, Sidlagatta and Sadali.
