= Bisalehalli =

- village
- Location in India Bisalehalli (Asia) Bisalehalli (India) Bisalehalli (Karnataka)
- Coordinates: 13.48°N 75.96°E
- Country: India
- Zone: South India
- State: Karnataka
- Administrative Division: Mysore division
- District: Chikmagaluru
- Tehsil: Kadur

Government
  - Body: Bisalehalli Panchayat

Area
  - Total: 1.1529 km^{2} (0.4451 sq mi)
- Elevation: 806 m (2,644 ft)

Population (2011)
  - Total: 795
  - Density: 690/km^{2} (1,790/sq mi)
- Demonym: Bisalehalliyavaru

Languages
  - Official: Kannada
- Time zone: UTC+5:30 (IST)
- PIN: 577548
- Telephone code: 08267
- ISO 3166 code: IN-KA
- Vehicle registration: KA-18
- Website: karnataka.gov.in

Bisalehalli is a village in Kadur taluk of Chikmagalur district, Karnataka, India. There are some interesting features of this village. Though it is a rural area more percent of land is used by the people to settle than for agriculture and it has a railway station and other features of an urban area.

== Toponym ==
The meaning of the name kept to this village in English is the village of sunshine as sun shines more here but the real meaning hid inside this is that there is more happiness is there in that place and so people kept its name as Bisalina Halli but it evolved as Bisalehalli. But it is still in doubt whether they kept its name for the sunshine or happiness or for any other reasons.

== History ==
It is still a mystery that whether this village has a history from Ancient times itself or people migrated from Davanagere district to here (Sadhu Lingayats) and then its history has started.

== Geology ==
More than 59 percent of the total area of the village is occupied by houses. Twelve percent is land which is not good for agriculture and the remaining 29 percent is used for agriculture.

== Civic administration ==
As according to 2011 census of India, Bisalehalli is administrated by Panchayat Raj.

== Demographics ==
As of 2011 census of India, Bisalehalli has a population of 795 members of which 426 are men and 369 are women. It has 198 houses.

== Settlement area ==
In the settlement area, with houses of all people there are some other stores for the needs of people. There is a Railway Station present in the village called as, Bisalehalli Railway Station where some trains stop three times a day one time in morning at 7:30 and two times at night at 7 and 9 o'clock. There is a famous temple named Kattehole Amma temple. There is a hospital called Bisalehalli Primary Hospital. There are two schools one primary school and one high school. There is a Canara Bank present in this village.
