= Kadur Junction railway station =

Railway station in India

Kadur Junction Kaduru Junction

General information
- Location: Kadur, Chikkamagaluru district, Karnataka; India
- Coordinates: 13.5503°N 76.0086°E
- Elevation: 770 metres (2,530 ft)
- Owner: Indian Railways
- Line: Bangalore–Hubli
- Platforms: 2
- Tracks: 4
- Connections: Auto stand

Construction
- Structure type: Standard (on-ground station)
- Parking: Yes
- Cycle facilities: Yes

Other information
- Status: Functioning
- Station code: DRU
- Fare zone: South Western Railway zone
Location
- Location within India Location within Karnataka

Kadur Junction railway station, also known as Kaduru Junction railway station (station code: DRU) is an Indian Railways station in Kadur in the Indian state of Karnataka.

Kadur Railway station became a Junction, with effect from 19-11-2013, after its connectivity extending to Chikmagalur. This junction belongs to Mysore division of South Western Railway zone of Indian Railways. Many intrastate and inter-state trains have their stoppage here.

== Junction ==
Kadur is well connected with most of the major cities like Shimoga, Mumbai, Bangalore, Pune, Bellary and Chennai and Chikmagalur through regular trains.
