= Rolla, Sri Sathya Sai district =

Rolla
- Village
- Interactive map of Rolla
- Location in Andhra Pradesh, India
- Coordinates: 13.8331°N 77.1000°E
- Country: India
- State: Andhra Pradesh
- District: Sri Sathya Sai
- Elevation: 726 m (2,382 ft)

Population (2011)
  - Total: 54,969

Languages
  - Official: Telugu
  - Other: Kannada
- Time zone: UTC+5:30 (IST)
- Climate: hot (Köppen)

Rolla is a village and mandal headquarter in Sri Sathya Sai district of Andhra Pradesh, India.

== Geography ==
Rolla is located at 13.8331°N 77.1000°E. It has an average elevation of 726 metres (2385 ft).

== Demographics ==
As of 2001 Indian census, the demographic details of Rolla mandal is as follows:

- Total Population: 34,888 in 7,296 Households.
- Male Population: 17,535 and Female Population: 17,353
- Children Under 6-years of age: 4,626 (Boys - 2,283 and Girls - 2,343)
- Total Literates: 15,581
