= Arsikeri =

Coordinates: 14°34′N 74°51′E

Arsikeri Arasikere
- village
- Interactive map of Arsikeri
- Country: India
- State: Karnataka
- District: Vijayanagara district
- Taluk: Harapanahalli

Population (2011)
  - Total: 6,126

Languages
  - Official: Kannada
- Time zone: UTC+5:30 (IST)
- Vehicle registration: KA-35

Arsikeri or Arasikere is a hobli and major village/town in the Harapanahalli Taluk of Vijayanagara District in the state of Karnataka, India. It is located in the 15km away from Harapanahalli city in Karnataka, and it was lied in state highway 47.

== Demographics ==
- As of 2001 India census, Arsikeri had a population of 5705 with 2935 males and 2770 females.
- As of 2011 India census, Arsikeri had a population of 6126 with 3130 males and 2996 females.

== See also ==
- Bellary
- Districts of Karnataka
