= Tirupati–Karimnagar Superfast Express =

Overview
- Service type: Superfast Express
- First service: 29 May 2013; 13 years ago
- Current operator: South Central Railways

Route
- Termini: Tirupati (TPTY); Karimnagar (KRMR)
- Stops: 10
- Distance travelled: 713 km (443 mi)
- Average journey time: 12h 15m
- Service frequency: Bi-Weekly (Note: Runs two days in a week for every direction.)
- Train number: 12761 / 12762

On-board services
- Classes: AC 2 tier, AC 3 tier, Sleeper class, General Unreserved
- Seating arrangements: No
- Sleeping arrangements: Yes
- Catering facilities: On-board catering, E-catering
- Observation facilities: Rake sharing with 12769/12770 Seven Hills Express
- Other facilities: Below the seats

Technical
- Rolling stock: LHB coach
- Track gauge: 1,676 mm (5 ft 6 in)
- Operating speed: 58 km/h (36 mph) average including halts
Route map
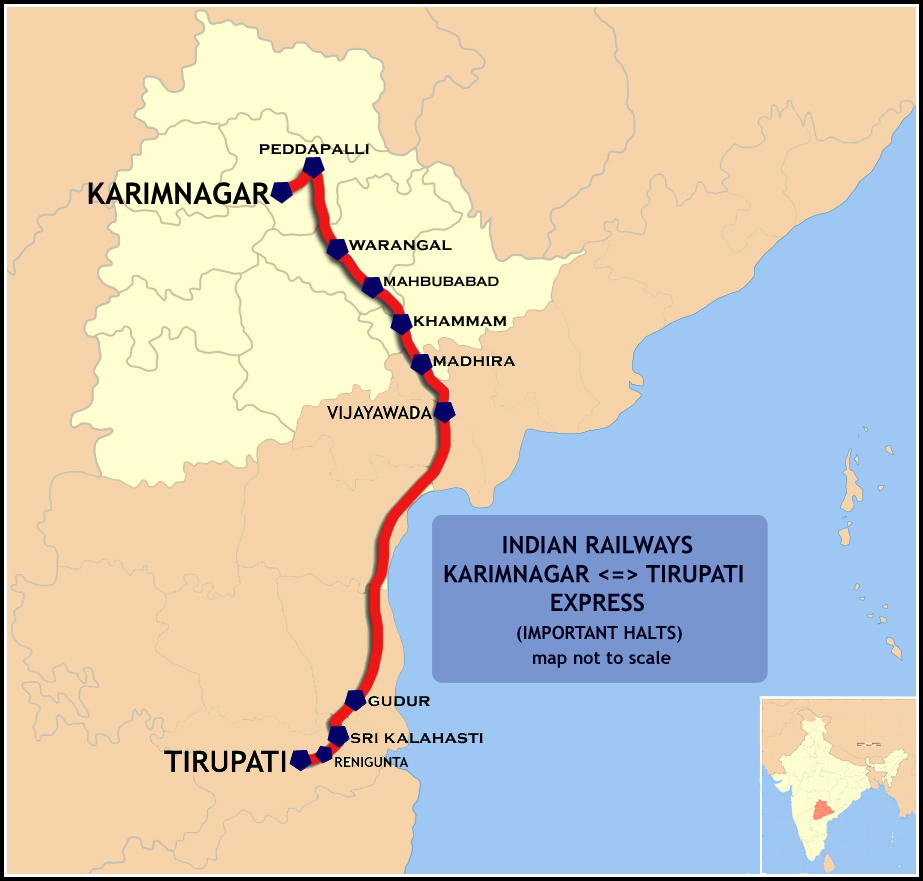

The 12761 / 12762 Tirupati–Karimnagar Superfast Express is a Superfast Express train belonging to South Central Railway zone that runs between Tirupati and Karimnagar in India. It is currently being operated with 12761/12762 train numbers on bi-weekly basis.

== Service ==
The 12761/Tirupati–Karimnagar Superfast Express has an average speed of 58 km/h and covers 713 km in 12h 15m. The 12762/Karimnagar–Tirupati Superfast Express has an average speed of 55 km/h and covers 713 km in 12h 55m.

== Route & Halts ==
The important halts of the train are:

- Tirupati
- Renigunta Junction
- Sri Kalahasti
- Gudur Junction
- Vijayawada Junction
- Madhira
- Khammam
- Mahbubabad
- Warangal
- Jammikunta
- Peddapalli Junction
- Karimnagar

== Coach composition ==
The train has LHB rakes with a maximum speed of 130 km/h. The train consists of 22 coaches since 26/7/2025:

- 2 AC II Tier
- 7 AC III Tier
- 7 Sleeper coaches
- 4 General Unreserved
- 1 SLR & 1 EOG

== Traction ==
Both trains are hauled by a Lallaguda Loco Shed-based WAP-7 or electric locomotive from Tirupati to Karimnagar and vice versa.

== Rake sharing ==
The train shares its rake with 12769/12770 - Tirupati - Secunderabad - Seven Hills Express.

== Direction reversal ==
The train reverses its direction 1 times:

- Peddapalli Junction

== See also ==
- Tirupati railway station
- Karimnagar railway station
- Yesvantpur–Puducherry Weekly Express
- Secunderabad–Darbhanga Express
- Seven Hills Express
