= Seven Hills Express =

Train in India

Overview
- Service type: Superfast Express
- Locale: Andhra Pradesh & Telangana
- First service: 9 December 2012; 13 years ago
- Current operator: South Central Railway

Route
- Termini: Tirupati (TPTY); Secunderabad (SC)
- Stops: 16
- Distance travelled: 713 km (443 mi)
- Average journey time: 12 hours 45 minutes
- Service frequency: Bi-weekly
- Train number: 12769 / 12770

On-board services
- Classes: AC 2 Tier, AC 3 Tier, Sleeper Class, General Unreserved
- Seating arrangements: Yes
- Sleeping arrangements: Yes
- Catering facilities: On-board catering, E-catering
- Observation facilities: Large windows
- Baggage facilities: Available
- Other facilities: Below the seats

Technical
- Rolling stock: LHB coach
- Track gauge: 1,676 mm (5 ft 6 in)
- Operating speed: 110 km/h (68 mph) maximum, 55 km/h (34 mph) average including halts.
Route map
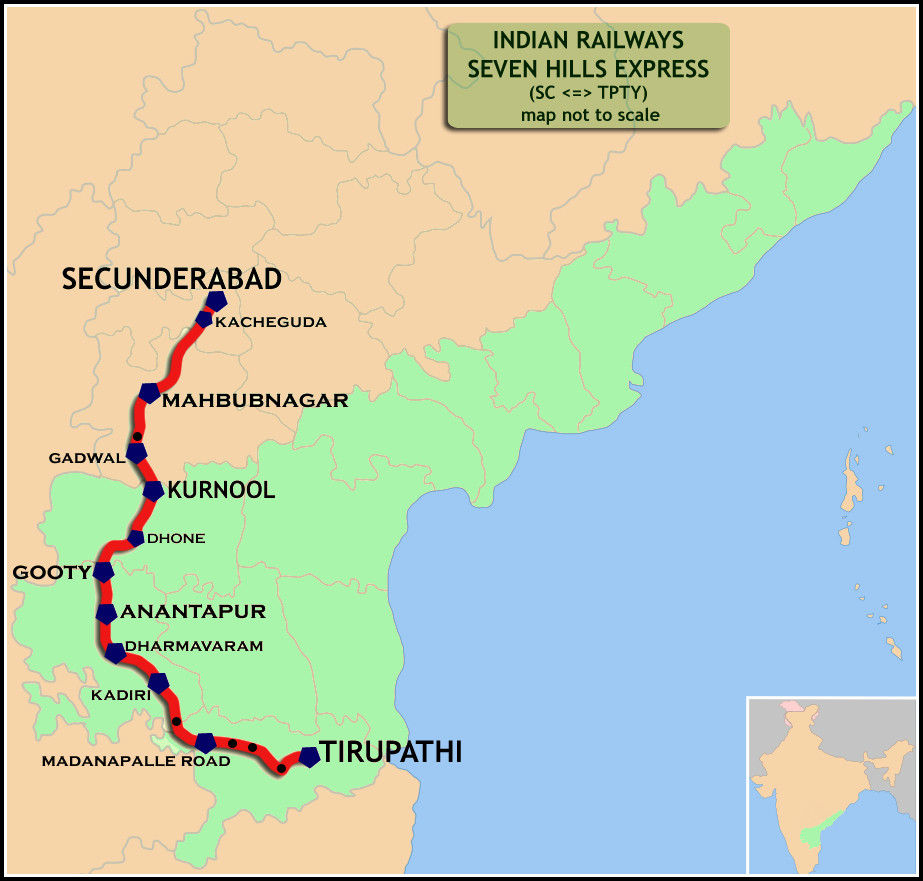

The 12769 / 12770 Seven Hills Express is a superfast express train belonging to Indian Railways–South Central Railway zone that runs between Tirupati and Secunderabad Junction in India.

It operates as train number 12769 from Tirupati to Secunderabad Junction and as train number 12770 in the reverse direction serving the states of Andhra Pradesh and Telangana.

It is named after the famed Seven Hills temple of Tirumala Venkateswara Temple.

== Coaches ==
The 12769 / 70 Tirupati–Secunderabad Seven Hills Express has 2 AC 2 tier, 7 AC 3 tier, 7 Sleeper Class, 4 General Unreserved,1 SLR (Seating cum Luggage Rake) coach and 1 End on generator. It does not carry a pantry car.

As is customary with most train services in India, coach composition may be amended at the discretion of Indian Railways depending on demand.

== Service ==
The 12769 / 70 Tirupati–Secunderabad Seven Hills Express covers the distance of 713.1 km (443 mi) in 12 hours 55 mins (55.12 km/h).

As the average speed of the train is above 55 km/h (34 mph), as per Indian Railways rules, its fare includes a Superfast surcharge.

== Routing ==
The 12769/12770 Seven Hills Express runs from Tirupati via Pakala Junction, Dharmavaram, Anantapur, Gooty, Dhone Junction, Kurnool City, Kacheguda to Secunderabad.

== Traction ==
Train is hauled by a Vijayawada Loco Shed based WAP-4 or Lallaguda Loco Shed based WAP-7 electric locomotive.

== Rake sharing ==
The train shares its rake with

- 12761/12762 Tirupati–Karimnagar Superfast Express
- 17047/17048 Charlapalli–Tiruchanur Express (via Warangal) Via Vijayawada, Warangal

== Operation ==
12769 Tirupati–Secunderabad Seven Hills Express leaves Tirupati every Monday and Friday arriving Secunderabad Junction} the next day.

12770 Secunderabad–Tirupati Seven Hills Express leaves Secunderabad Junction every Tuesday and Friday arriving Tirupati the next day.
