= Gudibande =

- city
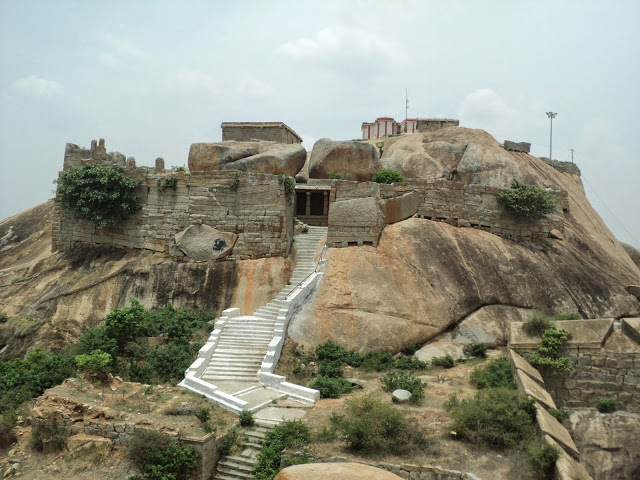
- Gudibande fort

- Location in Karnataka, India Gudibande (India)
- Coordinates: 13.67°N 77.7°E
- Country: India
- State: Karnataka
- District: Chikkaballapur
- Elevation: 826 m (2,710 ft)

Population (2001)
  - Total: 8,794

Languages
  - Official: Kannada
- Time zone: UTC+5:30 (IST)
- Postal code: 561209

Gudibande is a taluk and town in Chikkaballapur District in the Indian State of Karnataka.

Gudibande Fort was built by a yogi and local chieftain called Byre Gowda some 400 odd years ago in the 17th century. It was believed that he belonged to the Tuluva dynasty of the Vijayanagar empire. It can be considered a concise replica of the Madhugiri fort. The fort has seven levels with interconnecting escape routes which would help soldiers to flee in case of emergency. On the top of the fort is a Shiva temple known as "Sir Rameshwara Temple", established by Sage Vishwamitra and Lord Rama which is believed to be one of the 108 Jyotirlingas. The strong pillar with a square base has well sculpted images. The Byrasagara reservoir can also be seen. The fort's main feature is the rain water harvesting. It is said that there were around 19 rock ponds at different levels of the fort. However, the water channel system devised by Byre Gowda was said to be unique. Linking nineteen water bodies and tanks called dhones they could in all hold nearly 3 lakhs litres of rain water.

== Geography ==
Gudibande is located at 13.67°N 77.7°E. It has an average elevation of 826 metres (2709 feet).

== Demographics ==
As of 2001 India census, Gudibande had a population of 8794. Males constitute 50% of the population and females 50%. Gudibande has an average literacy rate of 62%, higher than the national average of 59.5%: male literacy is 69%, and female literacy is 56%. In Gudibande, 12% of the population is under 6 years of age.

== Places to visit ==
The Lakshmivenkataramanaswamy temple is one of the popular temples in Gudibande which was constructed by Cholas.

Narasimhaswamy Temple is sort of a cave temple hewn out a huge rock [the name Gudibande to the town came this: gudi = temple, Banda = rock]

Surasadmagiri Hill is the second highest hill in the District. The hill contains thirteen Ponds and two Temples of Lord Shiva and Goddess Parvathi.

Amani Byrasagara Lake was constructed by Byre Gowda in the 16th century.

Gudibande fort - The fort dating back to the middle of the 17th century was built by a small-time chieftain Byregowda who was the Robinhood of those times, known to loot the rich and help the poor.

== Directions ==
Gudibande is 100 km from Bengaluru (30 km from AP border). One can reach Gudibande by taking the Airport road. There are clear sign boards after Chikkaballapur towards both left and right side of the road. The roads to the place throughout are in good condition and can be accessed with minor difficulty. It is a less known place for trekkies, however, it is slowly becoming popular over the past few years. The hill can be ascended in less than one hour. All climbers are advised to carry their food and replenishments as none is available on top.
