= Chikmagalur railway station =

Railway station in Karnataka, India

General information
- Location: Belur Road, Chikmagalur; India
- Coordinates: 13°18′11″N 75°47′22″E
- Elevation: 1,010 metres (3,310 ft)
- System: Regional rail and light rail station
- Owner: Indian Railways
- Operator: South Western Railway Zone
- Line: Kadur-Chikkamagalur-Hassan
- Platforms: 2
- Tracks: 3

Construction
- Parking: Yes

Other information
- Status: Operational
- Station code: CMGR
- Zone(s): South Western Railway Zone
- Division(s): Mysore

History
- Opened: 19 November 2013; 12 years ago
Location

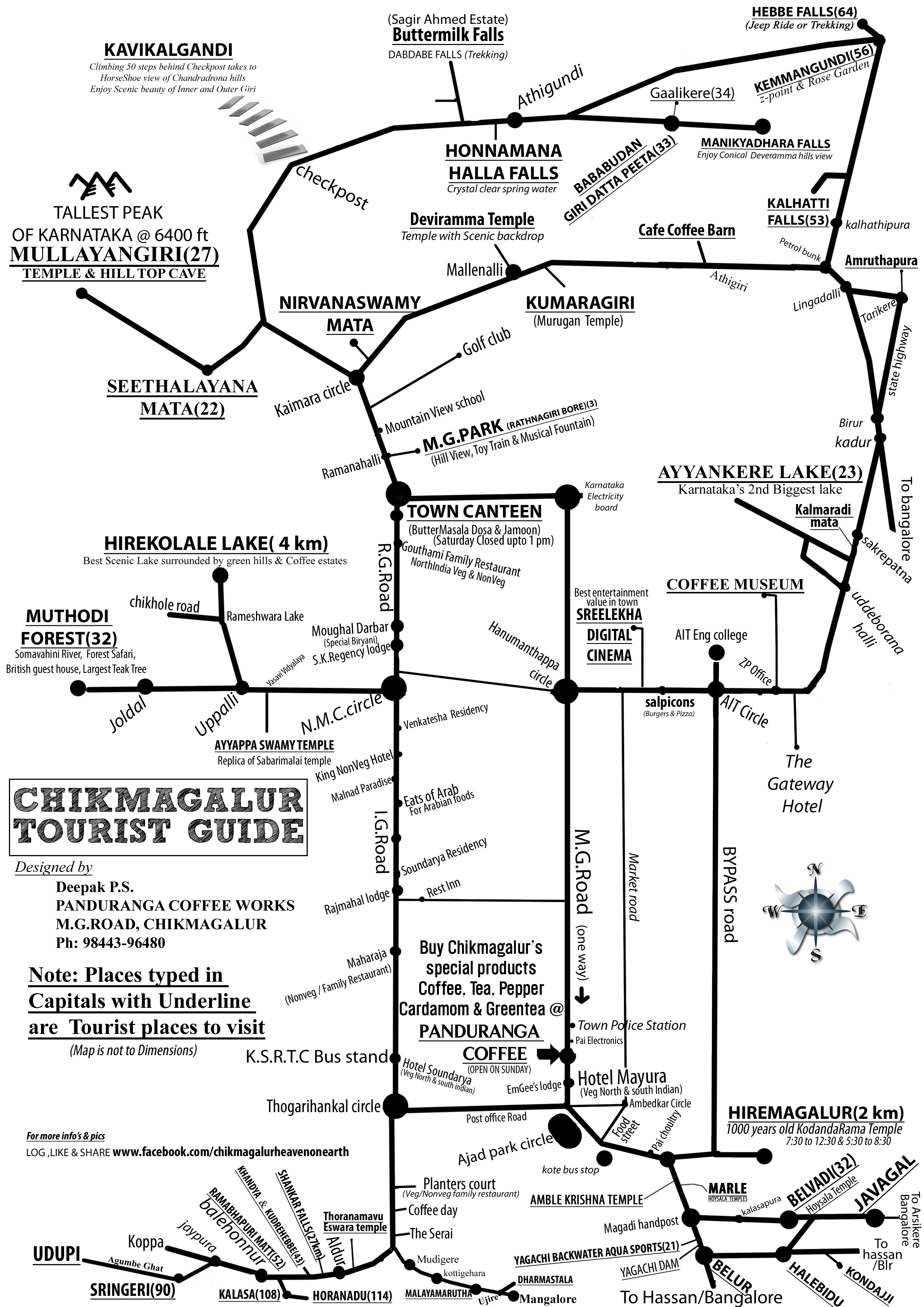
Chikmagalur tourist map

The Chikmagalur railway station serves Chikmagalur in Karnataka. The station code is CMGR. It has three platforms. It was inaugurated on 19 November 2013 by then Union Railway Minister Mallikarjun Kharge along with Siddaramaiah, Chief Minister of Karnataka and C. T. Ravi, MLA, Chikkamagalur.

== Geography ==
It is at an elevation of 1,010 metres (3,310 ft) above the mean sea level (MSL), making it the highest railway station in Karnataka.

== Trains ==
As of December 2025, only two unreserved passenger and one Weekly Express trains operate from the station:

1. 07366- Chikmagalur to Shivamogga Town Railway Station, Shimoga
2. 16239- Chikmagalur to Yesvantpur Junction railway station, Bangalore
3. 17424- Chikmagalur to Tirupati Weekly Express
