= Arsikere Junction railway station =

Railway Station in Karnataka, India

Arsikere Junction Arasikere Junction
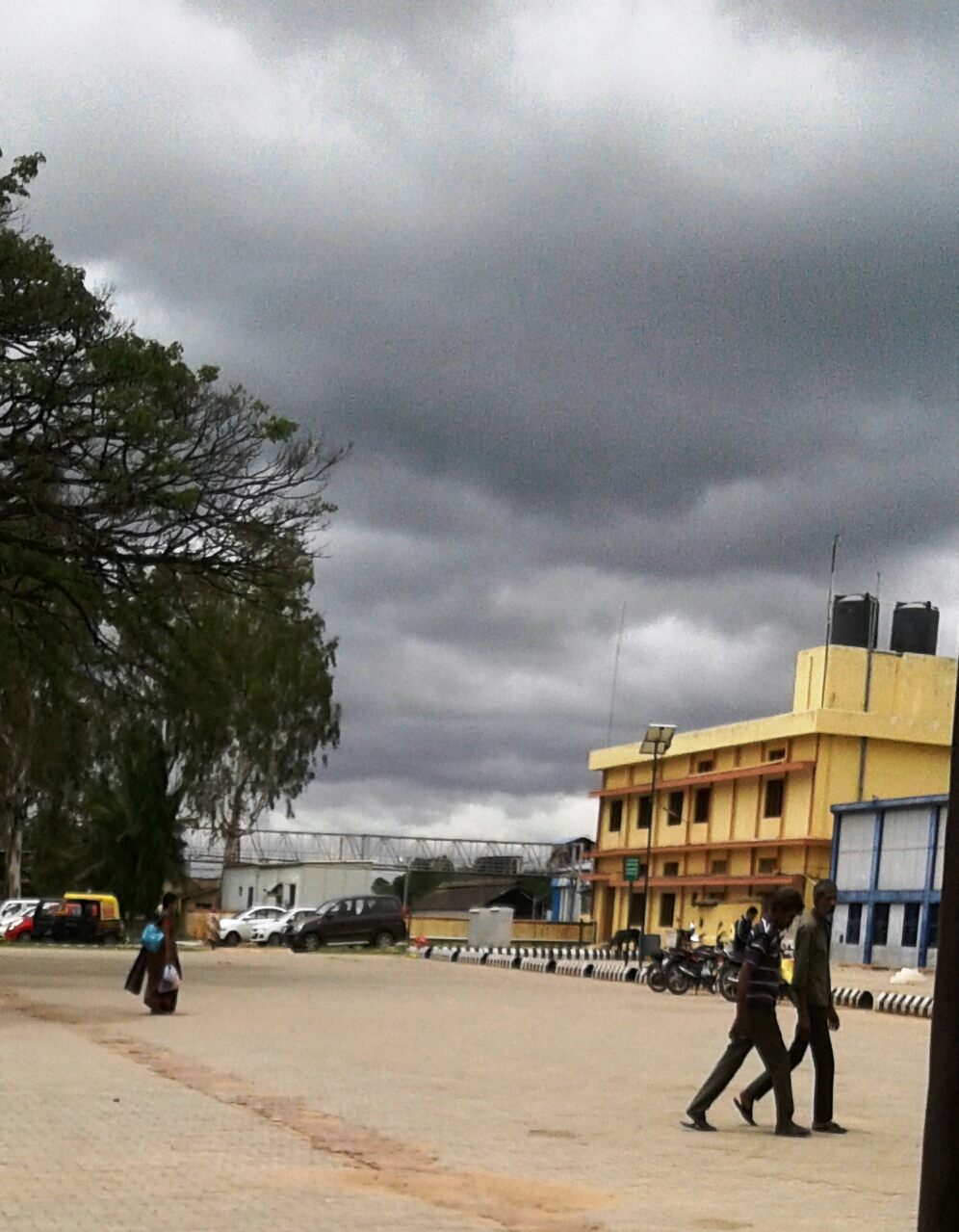
- Arasikere Junction

General information
- Location: Arsikere, Hassan district, Karnataka; India
- Coordinates: 13.3138°N 76.2531°E
- Elevation: 817 metres (2,680 ft)
- System: Indian Railways station
- Lines: Bangalore–Arsikere–Hubli line Arsikere–Hassan line
- Platforms: 3
- Tracks: 10+
- Connections: Auto stand

Construction
- Structure type: Standard (on-ground station)
- Parking: Yes
- Cycle facilities: No

Other information
- Status: Functioning
- Station code: ASK
- Fare zone: South Western Railway zone
Location

Arsikere Junction railway station, also known as Arasikere Junction railway station (station code: ASK). It is railway junction in Hassan district, Karnataka. It serves Arsikere city. The station consists of three platforms. The platforms are well sheltered. It is facilitated with water and sanitation. The station is a major railway junction between Bangalore, Hubli, Shimoga, Mysore, Hassan, Chikmagalur and Mangalore.
