= Machilipatnam–Dharmavaram Express =

Machilipatnam –Dharmavaram Express
Overview
- Service type: Express
- First service: 12 July 2016; 10 years ago
- Current operator: South Coast Railway zone

Route
- Termini: Machilipatnam (MTM); Dharmavaram Junction (DMM)
- Stops: 18
- Distance travelled: 695 km (432 mi)
- Average journey time: 14h 25m
- Service frequency: Daily train effective February 2019.
- Train number: 17215/17216

On-board services
- Classes: AC 2 tier, AC 3 tier, Sleeper class, General Unreserved
- Seating arrangements: No
- Sleeping arrangements: Yes
- Catering facilities: On-board catering E-catering
- Observation facilities: LHB coach
- Entertainment facilities: No
- Baggage facilities: No
- Other facilities: Below the seats

Technical
- Rolling stock: 2
- Track gauge: 1,676 mm (5 ft 6 in)
- Operating speed: 47 km/h (29 mph), including halts

The Machilipatnam–Dharmavaram Express is an Express train belonging to South Coast Railway zone that runs between Machilipatnam and Dharmavaram Junction in India. It is served daily with 17215/17216 train numbers.

== History ==
Initially ending at Vijayawada, it was extended to Machilipatnam on 14 February 2023. This is the first passenger train to bypass Gooty Junction in favor of Gooty Fort, skipping engine reversing time and efforts.

== Service ==
The 17215/Machilipatnam–Dharmavaram Express has an average speed of 49.6 km/h and covers 694 km in 14h 00m. The 17216/Dharmavaram–Machilipatnam Express has an average speed of 47.0 km/h and covers 694 km in 14h 45m.

== Route and halts ==
The important halts of the train are:

- Machilipatnam
- Pedana
- Gudivada
- Vijayawada Junction
- Guntur Junction
- Narasaraopet
- Vinukonda
- Markapur Road
- Giddalur
- Nandyal Junction
- Banaganapalle
- Koilakuntla
- Jammalamadugu
- Proddatur
- Yerraguntla Junction
- Tadipatri
- Gooty Fort
- Anantapur
- Dharmavaram Junction

== Coach composition ==
The train has standard LHB rakes with a maximum speed of 130 km/h. The train consists of 20 coaches:

- 2 AC II Tier
- 8 AC III Tier
- 6 Sleeper coaches
- 4 General Coaches
- 2 Generators cum Luggage/parcel van

== Traction ==
Both trains are hauled by a Vijayawada Loco Shed-based WAP-4 or WAP-7 electric locomotive.

== Direction reversal ==
The train reverses its direction at Yerraguntla Junction.

== See also ==
- Dharmavaram Junction railway station
- Vijayawada Junction railway station

== Notes ==
Frequency of this train has been increased. Now it runs as daily train effective February 2019.
