= Panyam railway station =

Railway station in Andhra Pradesh

Panyam

General information
- Location: Banaganapalle Road, Panyam, Nandyal district, Andhra Pradesh; India
- Coordinates: 15°30′03″N 78°20′21″E
- Elevation: 228 metres (748 ft)
- System: Indian Railways station
- Owner: Indian Railways
- Operator: Guntakal railway division
- Line: Guntakal–Nandyal line
- Platforms: 2
- Tracks: Double Electric-Line

Construction
- Structure type: Standard (on ground)

Other information
- Status: Functioning
- Station code: PNM
- Zone(s): South Coast Railway zone
- Division(s): Guntakal

Services
Preceding station	Indian Railways	Following station
Nandyal Junction towards ?	South Coast Railway zone Guntakal–Nandyal section	Krishnamma Kona towards ?
Location
- Interactive map

Panyam railway station is a railway station located on the Guntakal–Nandyal line operated by the South Coast Railway zone under Guntakal railway division. It is situated beside Banaganapalle Road at Panyam in Nandyal district in the Indian state of Andhra Pradesh.
