= Guntur–Tirupati Express =

Express train service in Andhra Pradesh, India

Overview
- Service type: Express
- Locale: Andhra Pradesh
- First service: 18 August 2022
- Current operator: South Coast Railway

Route
- Termini: Guntur Junction; Tirupati
- Distance travelled: 555 km (345 mi)
- Service frequency: Daily
- Train number: 17261 / 17262

On-board services
- Classes: AC 2-tier, AC 3-tier, Sleeper class, General unreserved

Technical
- Rolling stock: ICF coaches
- Track gauge: 5 ft 6 in (1,676 mm)
Route map
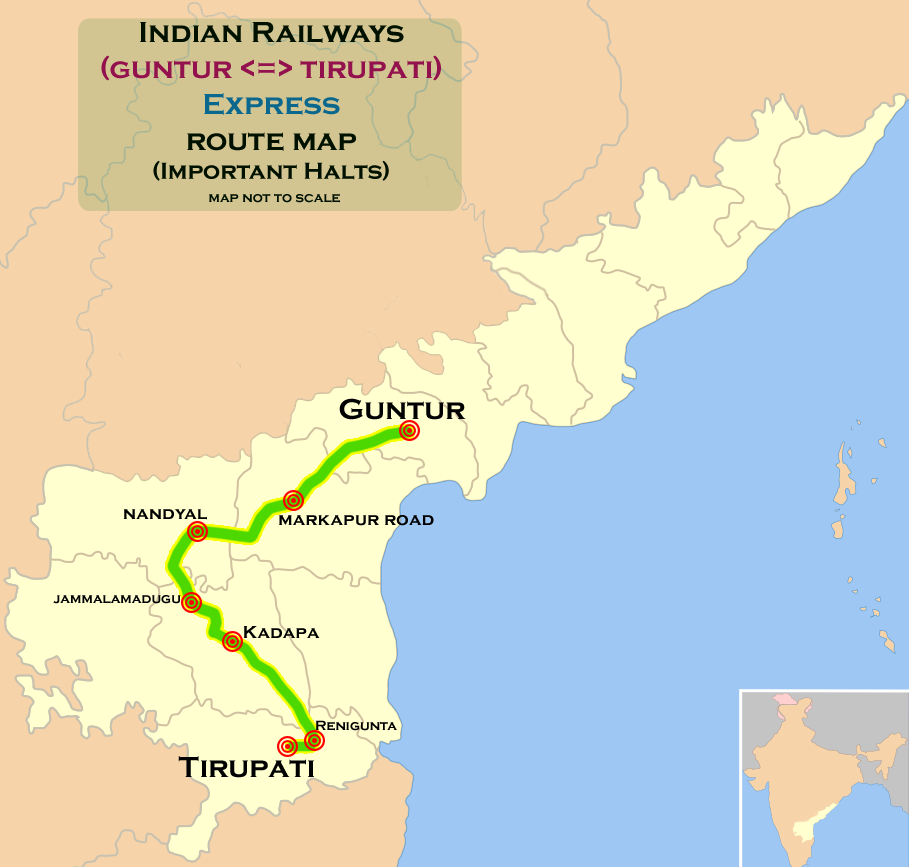

The Guntur–Tirupati Express is a daily express train operated by the South Coast Railway of Indian Railways. It connects Guntur Junction with Tirupati, providing direct rail connectivity between the coastal Andhra and Rayalaseema regions of Andhra Pradesh.

The service was introduced in August 2022 to improve passenger connectivity between Guntur district, Nandyal, Kadapa, and Tirupati.

== History ==
The train was inaugurated on 18 August 2022 as part of efforts to improve intra-state railway connectivity in Andhra Pradesh.

The introduction of the service reduced dependence on connecting trains for passengers travelling between Guntur and Tirupati via the Nandyal–Kadapa section.

== Route ==
The train operates between Guntur and Tirupati via Narasaraopet, Vinukonda, Markapur Road, Nandyal Junction,Banaganapalli,Koilakuntla,Jammalamadugu, Proddatur, Kadapa, Rajampeta, and Renigunta Junction.

== Service ==
The train operates daily in both directions, offering AC 2-tier, AC 3-tier, sleeper class, and general unreserved accommodations.

The entire route is fully electrified and is generally hauled by electric locomotives from the Vijayawada railway division.

== Developments ==
In 2026, Indian Railways approved plans to extend the service beyond Tirupati to Tiruchy via Pakala, Katpadi, Villupuram, and Vriddhachalam.

== Incidents ==
In May 2023, a robbery incident reported aboard the train near Kadapa received media attention.

== See also ==
- Guntur Junction railway station
- Tirupati railway station
- South Coast Railway zone
- Palnadu Express
- Guntur–Rayagada Express
