= Yerraguntla =

Town in Andhra Pradesh, India

- Town
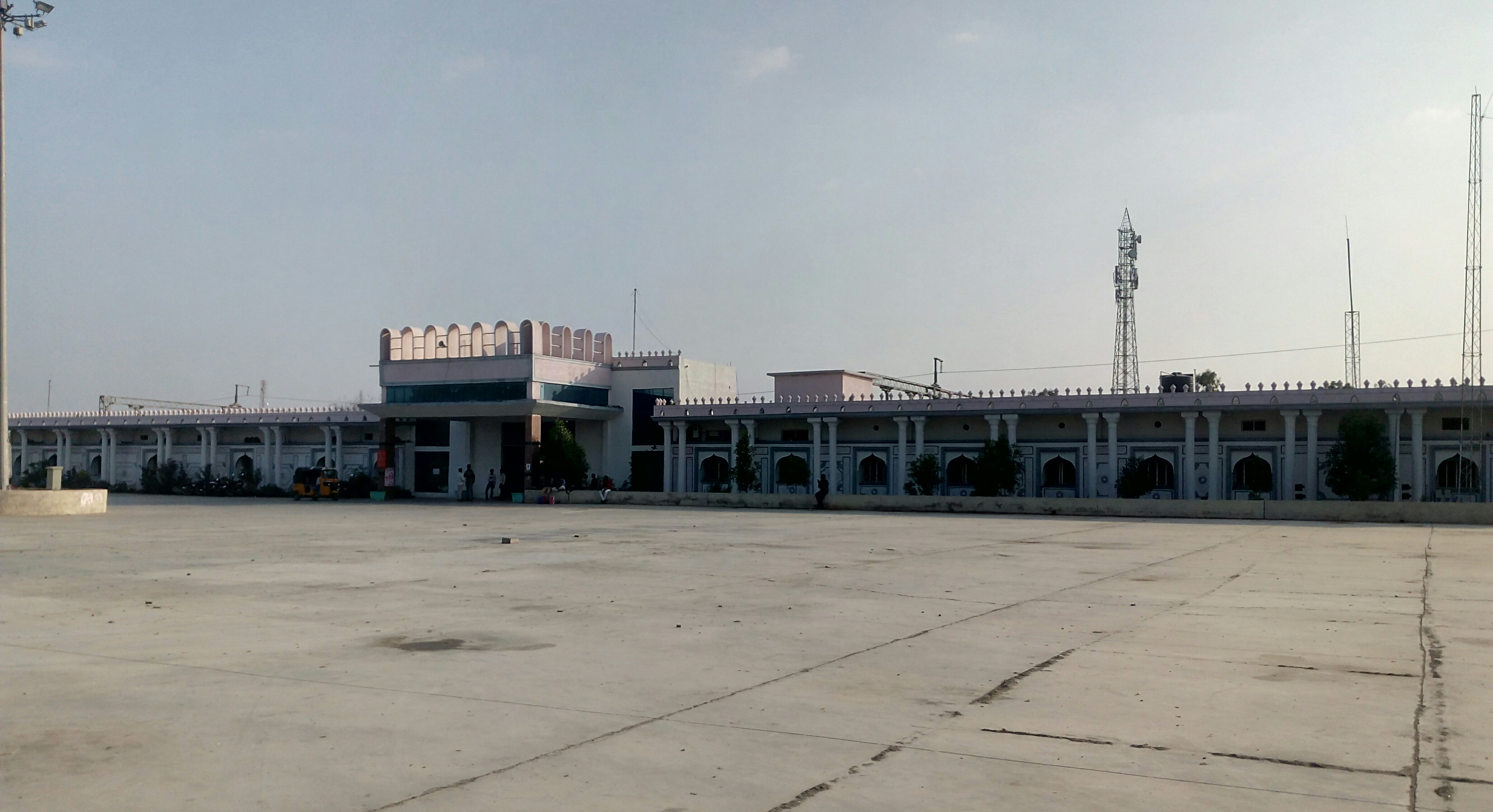
- Yerraguntla Junction Railway station Building

- Location in Andhra Pradesh, India
- Coordinates: 14.6333°N 78.5333°E
- Country: India
- State: Andhra Pradesh
- District: YSR Kadapa
- Elevation: 152 m (499 ft)

Population (2011)
  - Total: 32,574

Languages
  - Official: Telugu
- Time zone: UTC+5:30 (IST)
- Vehicle registration: AP-04

Yerraguntla is a town and Nagar Panchayat in YSR Kadapa District. It is an industrial area in YSR Kadapa district, Andhra Pradesh. It is located in Yerraguntla mandal of Kadapa revenue division.

== Geography ==
Yerraguntla is located at 7GJ5+XJ9 Yerraguntla, Andhra Pradesh.

== Demographics ==
As of 2011 Census of India, the town had a population of 32,574. The total population constitute, 16,558 males, 16,016 females and 3,754 children, in the age group of 0–6 years. The average literacy rate stands at 70.56% with 20,334 literates, lower than the national average of 73.00%.

== Transport ==
Yerraguntla Junction is a junction for Nandyal–Yerraguntla section and Guntakal–Chennai Egmore section. It falls under the jurisdiction of Guntakal railway division and is one of the 'D'-category station in the division.

== Governance ==
Civic administration

Yerraguntla Nagar Panchayat is the civic administrative body of the town which was constituted in the year 2012.

== Education ==
The primary and secondary school education is imparted by government, aided and private schools, under the School Education Department of the state.

== See also ==
- List of census towns in Andhra Pradesh
