= Tuggali railway station =

Railway station in Andhra Pradesh

Tuggali

General information
- Location: Tuggali, Kurnool district, Andhra Pradesh; India
- Coordinates: 15°18′40″N 77°31′49″E
- Elevation: 485 metres (1,591 ft)
- System: Indian Railways station
- Owner: Indian Railways
- Operator: Guntakal railway division
- Line: Guntakal–Nandyal line
- Platforms: 2
- Tracks: Double Electric-Line

Construction
- Structure type: Standard (on ground)

Other information
- Status: Functioning
- Station code: TGL
- Zone(s): South Coast Railway zone
- Division(s): Guntakal

Services
Preceding station	Indian Railways	Following station
Edduladoddi towards ?	South Coast Railway zone Guntakal–Nandyal section	Maddikera towards ?
Location
- Interactive map

Tuggali railway station is a railway station located on the Guntakal–Nandyal line operated by the South Coast Railway zone under Guntakal railway division. It is situated at Tuggali in Kurnool district in the Indian state of Andhra Pradesh.
