= Maddikera railway station =

Railway station in Andhra Pradesh

Maddikera

General information
- Location: Pattikonda-Guntakal Road, Maddikera, Kurnool district, Andhra Pradesh; India
- Coordinates: 15°15′24″N 77°24′41″E
- Elevation: 472 metres (1,549 ft)
- System: Indian Railways station
- Owner: Indian Railways
- Operator: Guntakal railway division
- Line: Guntakal–Nandyal line
- Platforms: 3
- Tracks: Double Electric-Line

Construction
- Structure type: Standard (on ground)

Other information
- Status: Functioning
- Station code: MKR
- Zone(s): South Coast Railway zone
- Division(s): Guntakal

Services
Preceding station	Indian Railways	Following station
Tuggali towards ?	South Coast Railway zone Guntakal–Nandyal section	Mallappa Gate towards ?
Location
- Interactive map

Maddikera railway station is a railway station located on the Guntakal–Nandyal line operated by the South Coast Railway zone under Guntakal railway division. It is situated beside Pattikonda-Guntakal Road at Maddikera in Kurnool district in the Indian state of Andhra Pradesh.
