= Bugganipalli Cement Nagar railway station =

Railway station in Andhra Pradesh

Bugganipalli Cement Nagar

General information
- Location: Cement Nagar-Bethamcherla Road, Bugganipalle, Nandyal district, Andhra Pradesh; India
- Coordinates: 15°29′11″N 78°11′43″E
- Elevation: 386 metres (1,266 ft)
- System: Indian Railways station
- Owner: Indian Railways
- Operator: Guntakal railway division
- Line: Guntakal–Nandyal line
- Platforms: 1
- Tracks: Double Electric-Line

Construction
- Structure type: Standard (on ground)

Other information
- Status: Functioning
- Station code: BEY
- Zone(s): South Coast Railway zone
- Division(s): Guntakal

Services
Preceding station	Indian Railways	Following station
Krishnamma Kona towards ?	South Coast Railway zone Guntakal–Nandyal section	Betamcherla towards ?
Location
- Interactive map

Bugganipalli Cement Nagar railway station is a railway station located on the Guntakal–Nandyal line operated by the South Coast Railway zone under Guntakal railway division. It is situated beside Cement Nagar-Bethamcherla Road at Bugganipalle in Nandyal district in the Indian state of Andhra Pradesh.
