= Rangapuram railway station =

Railway station in Andhra Pradesh

Rangapuram

General information
- Location: Rangapuram, Nandyal district, Andhra Pradesh; India
- Coordinates: 15°24′24″N 78°03′33″E
- Elevation: 440 metres (1,440 ft)
- System: Indian Railways station
- Owner: Indian Railways
- Operator: Guntakal railway division
- Line: Guntakal–Nandyal line
- Platforms: 1
- Tracks: Double Electric-Line

Construction
- Structure type: Standard (on ground)

Other information
- Status: Functioning
- Station code: RGM
- Zone(s): South Coast Railway zone
- Division(s): Guntakal

Services
| Preceding station | Indian Railways | Following station |
|---|---|---|
| Betamcherla towards ? | South Coast Railway zone Guntakal–Nandyal section | Malkapuram towards ? |
Location
- Interactive map

Rangapuram railway station is a railway station located on the Guntakal–Nandyal line operated by the South Coast Railway zone under Guntakal railway division. It is situated at Rangapuram in Nandyal district in the Indian state of Andhra Pradesh.
