= Malkapuram railway station =

Railway station in Andhra Pradesh

Malkapuram

General information
- Location: Malkapuram, Dhone Mandal, Nandyal district, Andhra Pradesh; India
- Coordinates: 15°22′08″N 77°58′03″E
- Elevation: 459 metres (1,506 ft)
- System: Indian Railways station
- Owner: Indian Railways
- Operator: Guntakal railway division
- Line: Guntakal–Nandyal line
- Platforms: 1
- Tracks: Double Electric-Line

Construction
- Structure type: Standard (on ground)

Other information
- Status: Functioning
- Station code: MLK
- Zone(s): South Coast Railway zone
- Division(s): Guntakal

Services
Preceding station	Indian Railways	Following station
Rangapuram towards ?	South Coast Railway zone Guntakal–Nandyal section	Dhone Junction towards ?
Location
- Interactive map

Malkapuram railway station is a railway station located on the Guntakal–Nandyal line operated by the South Coast Railway zone under Guntakal railway division. It is situated at Malkapuram, Dhone Mandal in Nandyal district in the Indian state of Andhra Pradesh.
