= Betamcherla railway station =

Railway station in Andhra Pradesh

Betamcherla
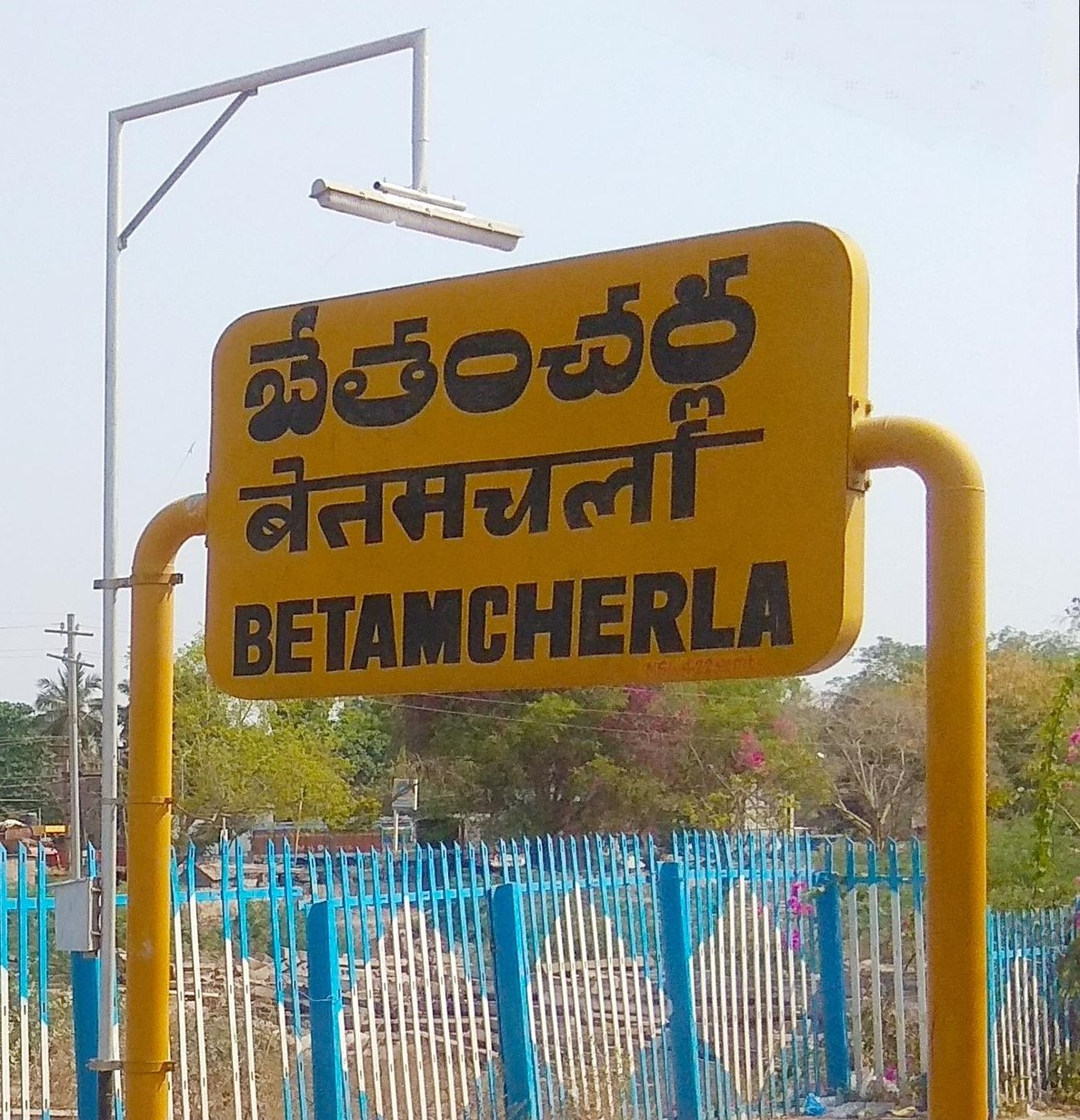
- Bethamcherla railway station Board

General information
- Location: Bethamcherla, Nandyal district, Andhra Pradesh; India
- Coordinates: 15°26′58″N 78°08′55″E
- Elevation: 425 metres (1,394 ft)
- System: Indian Railways station
- Owner: Indian Railways
- Operator: Guntakal railway division
- Line: Guntakal–Nandyal line
- Platforms: 2
- Tracks: Double Electric-Line

Construction
- Structure type: Standard (on ground)

Other information
- Status: Functioning
- Station code: BMH
- Zone(s): South Coast Railway zone
- Division(s): Guntakal

Services
Preceding station	Indian Railways	Following station
Bugganipalli Cement Nagar towards ?	South Coast Railway zone Guntakal–Nandyal section	Rangapuram towards ?
Location
- Interactive map

Betamcherla railway station is a railway station located on the Guntakal–Nandyal line operated by the South Coast Railway zone under Guntakal railway division. It is situated at Bethamcherla in Nandyal district in the Indian state of Andhra Pradesh.
