= Tuggali =

- village
- Interactive map of Tuggali
- Location in Andhra Pradesh, India Tuggali (India)
- Coordinates: 15.3333°N 77.5500°E
- Country: India
- State: Andhra Pradesh
- District: Kurnool
- Elevation: 469 m (1,539 ft)

Languages
  - Official: Telugu
- Time zone: UTC+5:30 (IST)
- Postal code: 518390
- Vehicle registration: AP

Tuggali is a village and headquarters of Tuggali mandal in Kurnool district of Andhra Pradesh, India. Tuggali is a village of nearly 5000 population.

== Geography ==
Tuggali is located at 15.3333°N 77.5500°E. It has an average elevation of 469 meters (1541 feet).

== Transportation ==
Tuggali railway station is located on the Guntakal–Nandyal line.
