= Bugganipalle =

- city
- Location in Andhra Pradesh, India
- Coordinates: 15°28′26″N 78°10′33″E
- Country: India
- State: Andhra Pradesh
- District: Nandyal
- Mandal: Bethamcherla

Government
  - Type: Dhone assembly constituency and Nandyal Parliament Constituency.

Population (2001)
  - Total: 11,470

Languages
  - Official: Telugu
- Time zone: UTC+5:30 (IST)
- Postal code: 518206
- Vehicle registration: AP021

Bugganipalle is a census town in Bethamcherla mandal, Nandyal district in the state of Andhra Pradesh, India.

== Demographics ==
As of 2001 India census, Bugganipalle had a population of 11,470. Males constitute 51% of the population and females 49%. Bugganipalle has an average literacy rate of 58%, lower than the national average of 59.5%; with male literacy of 70% and female literacy of 45%. 12% of the population is under 6 years of age.

== Transportation ==
Bugganipalli Cement Nagar railway station is the nearest railway connection located on the Guntakal–Nandyal line.
