= Bethamcherla =

Bethamcherla Betamcherla
- Nagar Panchayat
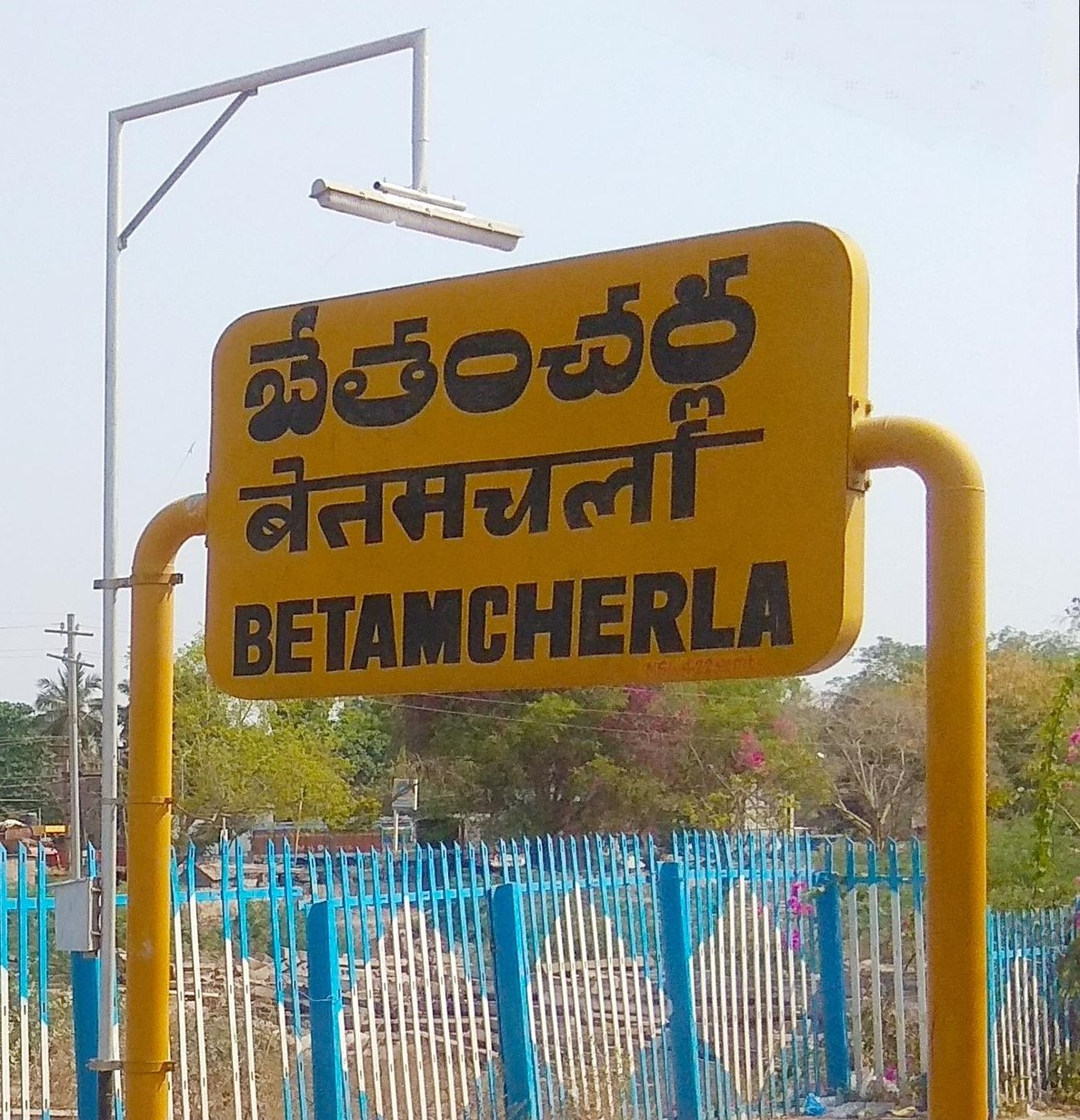
- Bethamcherla railway station

- Location in Andhra Pradesh, India
- Coordinates: 15.4667°N 78.1667°E
- Country: India
- State: Andhra Pradesh
- Region: Rayalaseema
- District: Nandyal
- Settled: Century B.C.

Government
  - Type: Municipality
  - Body: Nagar panchayat

Population (2011)
  - Total: 38,994

Languages
  - Official: Telugu, తెలుగు
- Time zone: UTC+5:30 (IST)
- PIN: 518599
- Telephone code: (091)-8516

Bethamcherla is a town with Nagar panchayat civic status and mandal headquarters located in Nandyal district of the Indian state of Andhra Pradesh. It comes under Dhone assembly constituency and Nandyal Parliament Constituency.

== Demographics ==
As of 2011 census, the town had a population of 38,994. The total population constitute, 19,424 males and 19,570 females —a sex ratio of 1008 females per 1000 males. 4,882 children are in the age group of 0–6 years. The average literacy rate stands at 65.60% with 22,379 literates, lower than the state average of 67.41%.

== Education ==
The primary and secondary school education is imparted by government, aided and private schools, under the School Education Department of the state.

== Transportation ==
Betamcherla railway station is the nearest rail connection located on Guntakal–Nandyal section.
