= Maddikera =

Maddikera Madavipuram
- village
- Interactive map of Maddikera
- Location in Andhra Pradesh, India
- Coordinates: 15.2500°N 77.4167°E
- Country: India
- State: Andhra Pradesh
- District: Kurnool
- Elevation: 456 m (1,496 ft)

Languages
  - Official: Telugu
- Time zone: UTC+5:30 (IST)
- <!518385 PIN -->: 518385
- Vehicle registration: AP

Maddikera is a village in Maddikera East mandal Kurnool district of Andhra Pradesh, India.

== Geography ==
Maddikera is located at the border of Kurnool district 15.2500°N 77.4167°E. It has an average elevation of 456 meters (1499 feet).

== Transportation ==
Maddikera railway station is located on the Guntakal–Nandyal line.
