= Dathapuram =

Dathapuram GSK
- Village
- Location in Andhra Pradesh, India
- Coordinates: 14°51′52″N 78°21′57″E
- Country: India
- State: Andhra Pradesh
- District: Cuddapah
- Established: 1950 s

Government
  - Type: TDP 9491989127

Population (2001)
  - Total: 7,678

Languages
  - Official: Telugu
- Time zone: UTC+5:30 (IST)
- PIN: 516474

Dathapuram is a census town located in R.S Kondapuram Mandal, Kadapa district, Andhra Pradesh, India. Dathapuram is under the constituency of Jammalamadugu. Dathapuram is situated along the bank of the Penna River. Gandikota dam is constructed just 13 km away from it, that supplies water for drinking. Dathapuram is also famous for people making silk sarees with their own hands.

In the village, people of all religions are living together. There are religion temples of Sri Chodeswari, Hanuman, Gali Dhelam, Hanuman and Mosque, etc. where all the religions people are celebrating their festivals grandly. A major ceremony held is "Jyothi Uthsavas" at the time of Sankranthi. Ganesh Chaturthi is also celebrated very well. Here, it is not only the religion's temple but also the 5 national temples. The high school has well constructed buildings and playground. In spite of the huge competition from the present corporate studies, the students of this high school are showing their talent in ssc public exams by getting top marks in district level.

== Demographics ==
As of 2001 India census, Dathapuram had a population of 7,678. Males constitute 51% of the population and females 49%. Dathapuram has an average literacy rate of 54%, lower than the national average of 59.5%: male literacy is 67% and, female literacy is 40%. In Dathapuram, 12% of the population is under 6 years of age.
