= Panyam =

- Town
- Interactive map of Panyam
- Location in Andhra Pradesh, India
- Coordinates: 15.5167°N 78.3500°E
- Country: India
- State: Andhra Pradesh
- District: Nandyal
- Elevation: 218 m (715 ft)

Population (2011)
  - Total: 14,565

Languages
  - Official: Telugu
- Time zone: UTC+5:30 (IST)
- Postal code: 518112
- Vehicle registration: AP

Panyam or Panem is a village and Mandal Headquarter in Panyam Mandal, Nandyal district, Andhra Pradesh State. Panyam is a main town for the Panyam mandal.

== Geography ==
Panyam is located at 15.5167°N 78.3500°E. It has an average elevation of 218 meters (718 feet).

Panyam is on NH-40. It is 15 km away from Nandyal, 50 km from Kurnool and 30 km from Banaganapalle. Panyam railway station is located on the Guntakal–Nandyal line.

== Demographics ==
The town is home to about 14562 people, among them 7291 (50%) are male and 7271 (50%) are female. 79% of the whole population are from general caste, 8% are from schedule caste and 13% are schedule tribes. Child (aged under 6 years) population of Panyam village is 12%, among them 51% are boys and 49% are girls. There are 3452 households in the village and an average 4 persons live in every family.

== History ==
=== Zaminadri estate ===
Panyam is one of the Zaminadri estates in Madras Presidency of British India.

=== Horticulture ===
Panyam is famous for its horticulture produce. It is one of the hubs for horticultural studies in Madras Presidency during the rule of British India. According to the Madras Presidency Department of Agriculture, P.V.Madhava Rao & Son's Nursery is the only nursery present in the Panyam during the British Raj times. British officials were particularly impressed with the horticultural practices obtained in Messrs. P. V. Madhavarao and Sons gardens in Panyam and appreciated the proprietor and said that they learnt much from the proprietor of the garden. The proprietor of the garden Raja P. V. Madhava Rao used to teach the courses on horticulture techniques and at the end of the course, theoretical and practical examinations were conducted. P. V. Madhava Rao's first son P. V. Krishna Rao was the first and his third son P. V. Ranganatha Rao was the second President of Panyam Panchayati raj who played a crucial role in the development of the village.

Panyam is an important center for fruits such as mangos, Oranges, Guava, Wood- Apple and Sapota in Madras Presidency during the British rule and even now it is an important hub for these fruits.

=== Temples ===
Panikeshwara Swamy temple, a temple dedicated to Shiva is one of the oldest temples in Panyam. The origin of the temple dates back to Chalukya times. In a survey conducted in October 1973 they found that the temple is of the Western Chalukya architecture.

== See also ==
- List of zamindari estates in Madras Presidency
