= Kadapa–Bangalore section =

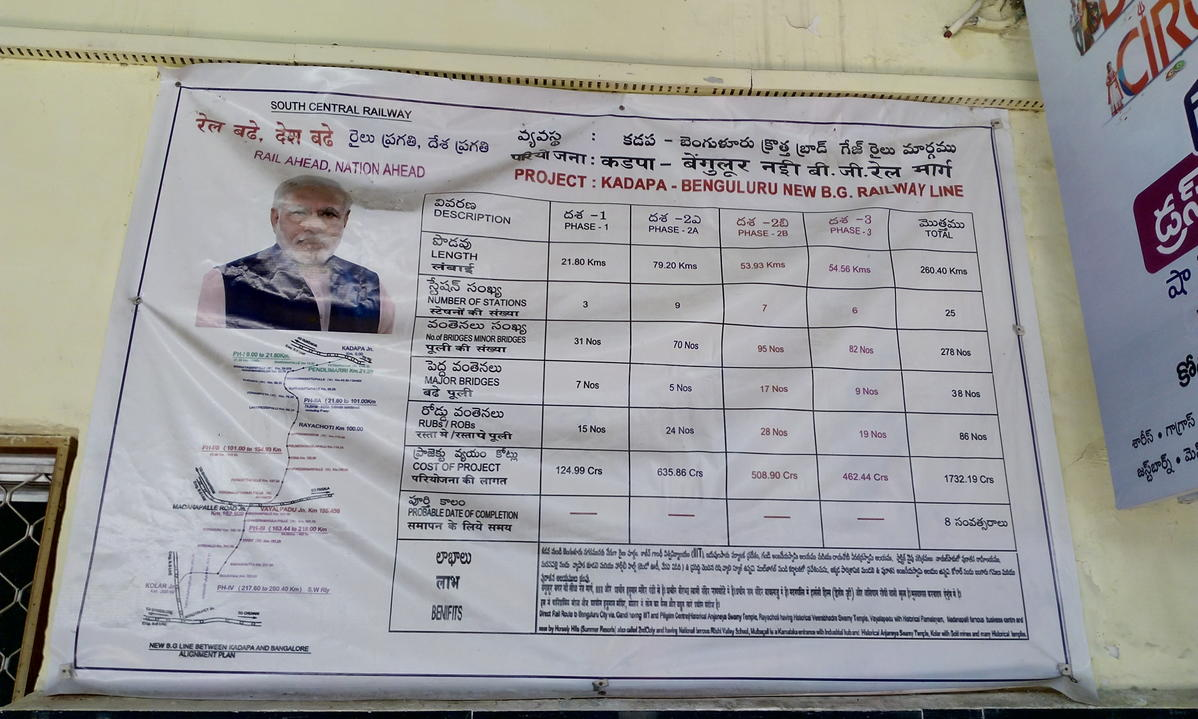
- Kadapa–Bangalore line jurisdiction

Overview
- Status: Operational up to Pendlimarri
- Owner: Indian Railways
- Locale: Andhra Pradesh, Karnataka
- Termini: Kadapa; Kolar

Service
- System: Main line is electrified and branch line is diesel
- Operator(s): South Coast Railway zone, South Western Railway zone

Technical
- Line length: 257.00 km (159.69 mi)
- Track gauge: 5 ft 6 in (1,676 mm) broad gauge
- Electrification: Yes
- Operating speed: 100 km/h
Route map
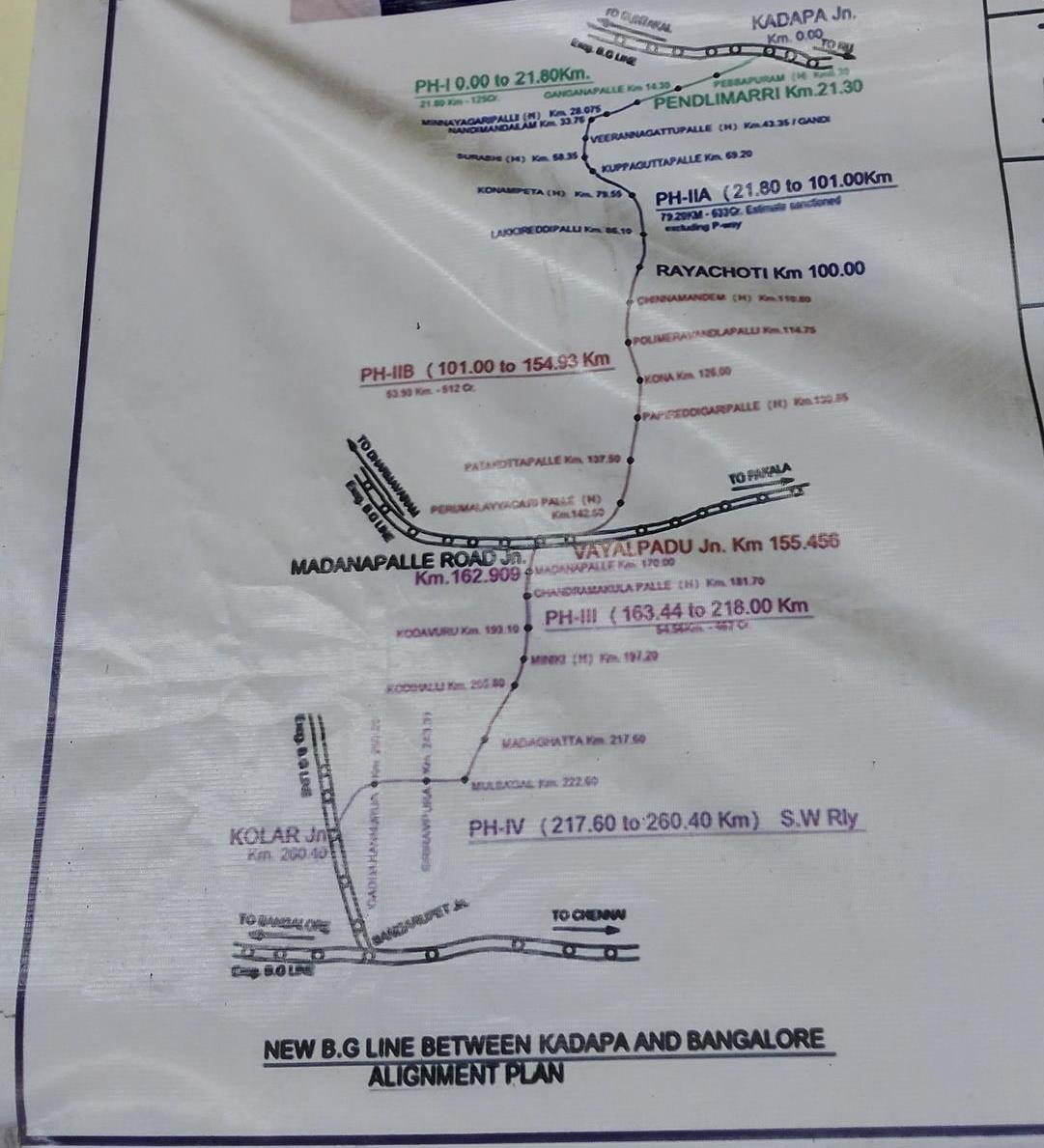
Route map

Kadapa–Bangalore section is an ongoing broad-gauge railway line project in the Indian states of Andhra Pradesh and Karnataka. It connects Kadapa in Andhra Pradesh with Bangalore in Karnataka via Kolar.

== History ==
The Kadapa–Bangalore railway project, a 260.4 km broad-gauge line connecting Kadapa, Andhra Pradesh, to Bangalore, Karnataka, via Kolar, was initiated by the United Progressive Alliance (UPA) government under Union Railways Minister Lalu Prasad Yadav, with the foundation stone laid on 2 September 2010.

The project, covering four phases (Kadapa-Rayachoti, Rayachoti-Madanapalle, Madanapalle-Mulbagal, Mulbagal-Bangalore), aims to enhance Rayalaseema’s trade and connectivity.

Under the YSR Congress Party (YSRCP) government, Chief Minister Y.S. Jagan Mohan Reddy and Kadapa MP Y.S. Avinash Reddy advocated for a route change to Muddanuru-Mudigubba, aiding progress despite funding delays.

== Construction ==
This project will be constructed in four stages namely. Stage 1 will connect Rayachoti and stage 2 with Dharmavaram–Pakala branch line at Madanapalle and stage 3 will connect Madanapalle to Mulbagal and stage 4 last will connect Mulbagal to Kolar and last via Bangarapet to reach Bangalore.

== Jurisdiction ==
This project falls under the jurisdiction of both Guntakal railway division of South Coast Railway zone and Bangalore railway division of South Western Railway zone. Out of 260.40 km, 217.60 km falls under Guntakal railway division and rest of the route km falls under the jurisdiction of Bangalore railway division.

== Status ==
This railway line is operational up to Pendlimarri and regular train service started from June 16, 2017. Rs.210 crores were allotted in 2019 for this railway line.
