= Nandyal revenue division =

- revenue division
- Interactive map of Nandyal revenue division
- Coordinates: 15.5258°N 78.2913°E
- Country: India
- State: Andhra Pradesh
- District: Nandyal
- Headquarters: Nandyal
- Time zone: UTC+05:30 (IST)

Nandyal revenue division (or Nandyal division) is an administrative division in the Nandyal district of the Indian state of Andhra Pradesh. It is one of the 4 revenue divisions in the district with 12 mandals under its administration. The division headquarters is located at Nandyal.

== Administration ==
The 12 mandals administered under the Nandyal revenue division area are:

1. Allagadda
2. Chagalamarri
3. Dornipadu
4. Gadivemula
5. Gospadu
6. Mahanandi
7. Nandyal Urban
8. Nandyal Rural
9. Panyam
10. Rudravaram
11. Sirivella
12. Uyyalawada

== See also ==
- List of revenue divisions in Andhra Pradesh
- Atmakur revenue division
- Dhone revenue division
- Banaganapalle revenue division
