= Panyam mandal =

- Mandal
- Interactive map outlining mandal
- Location in Andhra Pradesh, India
- Coordinates: 15.2411°N 78.6026°E
- Country: India
- State: Andhra Pradesh
- District: Nandyal
- Headquarters: Panyam

Population
  - Total: 51,426

Languages
  - Official: Telugu
- Time zone: UTC+5:30 (IST)
- Vehicle registration: AP

Panyam mandal is one of the 29 mandals in Nandyal district of the state of Andhra Pradesh in India. It is under the administration of Nandyal revenue division, and the headquarters are located at Panyam.
