= Guntur–Rayagada Express =

Train in India

Overview
- Service type: Express
- Locale: Andhra Pradesh & Odisha
- Current operator: South Coast Railway

Route
- Termini: Guntur; Rayagada
- Distance travelled: 535 km (332 mi)
- Average journey time: 14 hours 55 minutes
- Service frequency: Daily
- Train number: 17243 / 17244

On-board services
- Classes: AC 3 Tier, General Unreserved, Sleeper Class
- Seating arrangements: Yes
- Sleeping arrangements: Yes
- Catering facilities: E-catering
- Observation facilities: Large windows
- Baggage facilities: No
- Other facilities: Below the seats

Technical
- Rolling stock: ICF coach
- Track gauge: Broad Gauge
- Operating speed: 35 km/h (22 mph) average including halts.
Route map
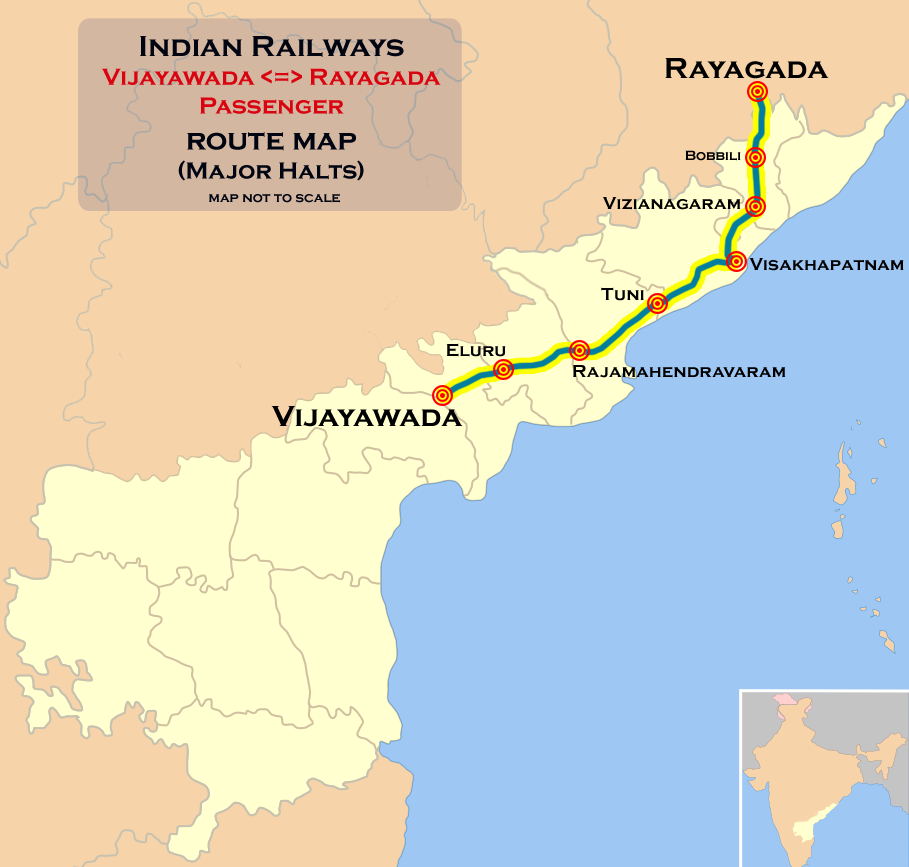

The 17243 / 17244 Guntur–Rayagada Express is an express train that runs between Guntur Junction in Andhra Pradesh and Rayagada in Odisha. Earlier it was a passenger train and was converted to Express from 1 April 2018.

It was extended till Guntur from 1 November 2018. It was previously runs as Vijayawada–Vizianagaram Express.

== History ==
It was first introduced as Vijayawada-Vizianagaram Passenger. Later in Rail budget 1999–2000, it was extended to Rayagada. It was converted to Express train from 1 April 2018. Later it was extended till Guntur from Nov 1st, 2018

== Coaches ==
It consists of Four Sleeper, Twelve Unreserved coaches and two guard cum luggage vans. The total composition is 18 coaches.

| Loco | 1 | 2 | 3 | 4 | 5 | 6 | 7 | 8 | 9 | 10 | 11 | 12 | 13 | 14 | 15 | 16 | 17 | 18 | 19 |
|---|---|---|---|---|---|---|---|---|---|---|---|---|---|---|---|---|---|---|---|
| | SLR | UR | UR | UR | UR | UR | UR | UR | S1 | S2 | S3 | S4 | S5 | B1 | UR | UR | UR | UR | SLR |

== Rake Sharing ==
It shares rake with 17261/17262 Guntur–Tirupati Express

== Loco ==
It is hauled by WAG-5 Electric loco of Vijayawada loco shed from Guntur to Rayagada.
