= Jammalamadugu =

- Town
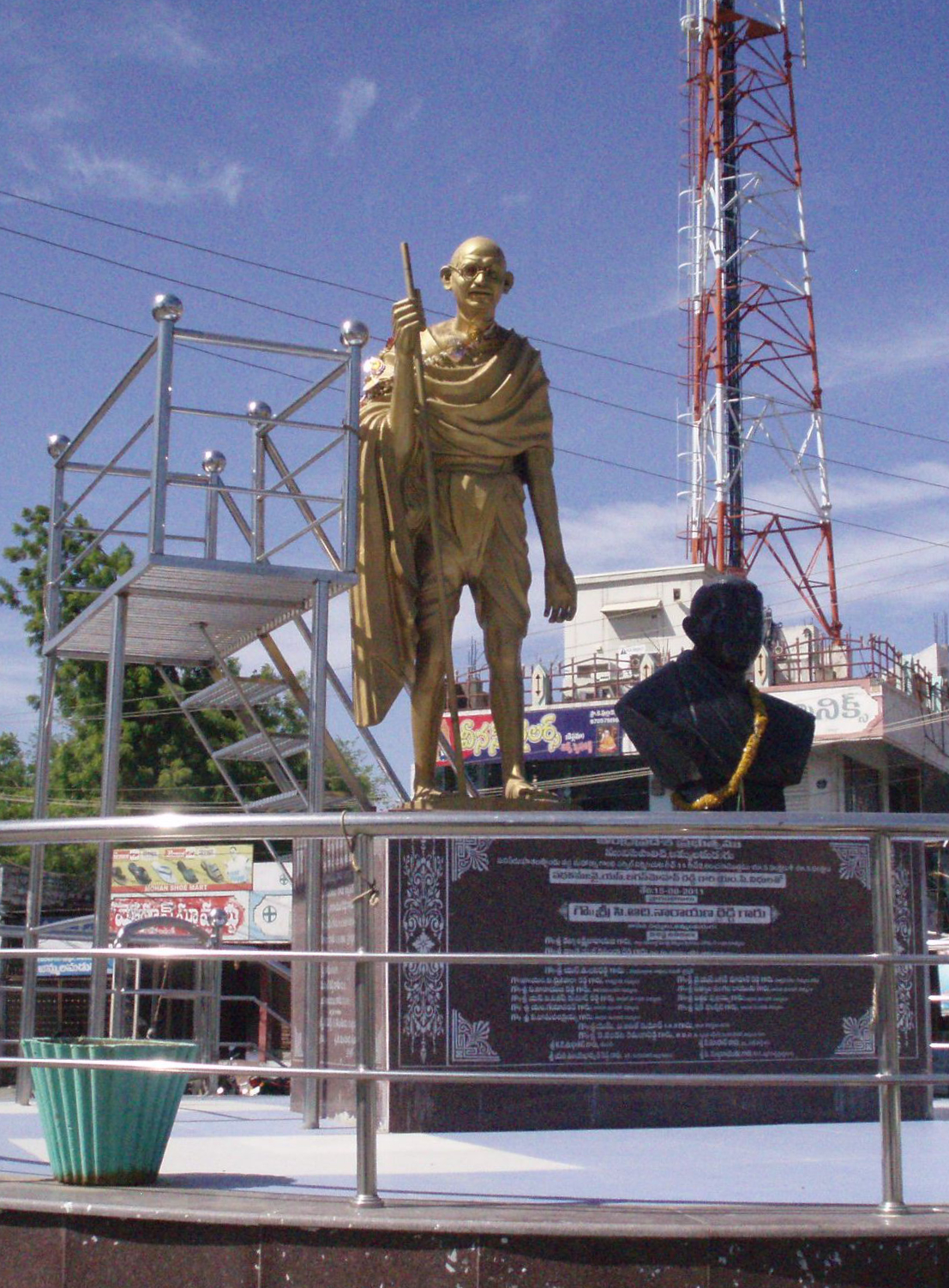
- Mahatma Gandhi statue in Jammalamadugu

- Location at Kadapa district in Andhra Pradesh, India
- Coordinates: 14.85°N 78.38°E
- Country: India
- State: Andhra Pradesh
- Region: Rayalaseema
- District: YSR Kadapa

Area
  - Total: 24.83 km^{2} (9.59 sq mi)
- Elevation: 184 m (604 ft)

Population (2011)
  - Total: 46,069
  - Density: 1,855/km^{2} (4,805/sq mi)

Languages
  - Official: Telugu
- Time zone: UTC+5:30 (IST)
- PIN: 516434
- Vehicle registration: AP-04
- Website: Jammalamadugu Municipality

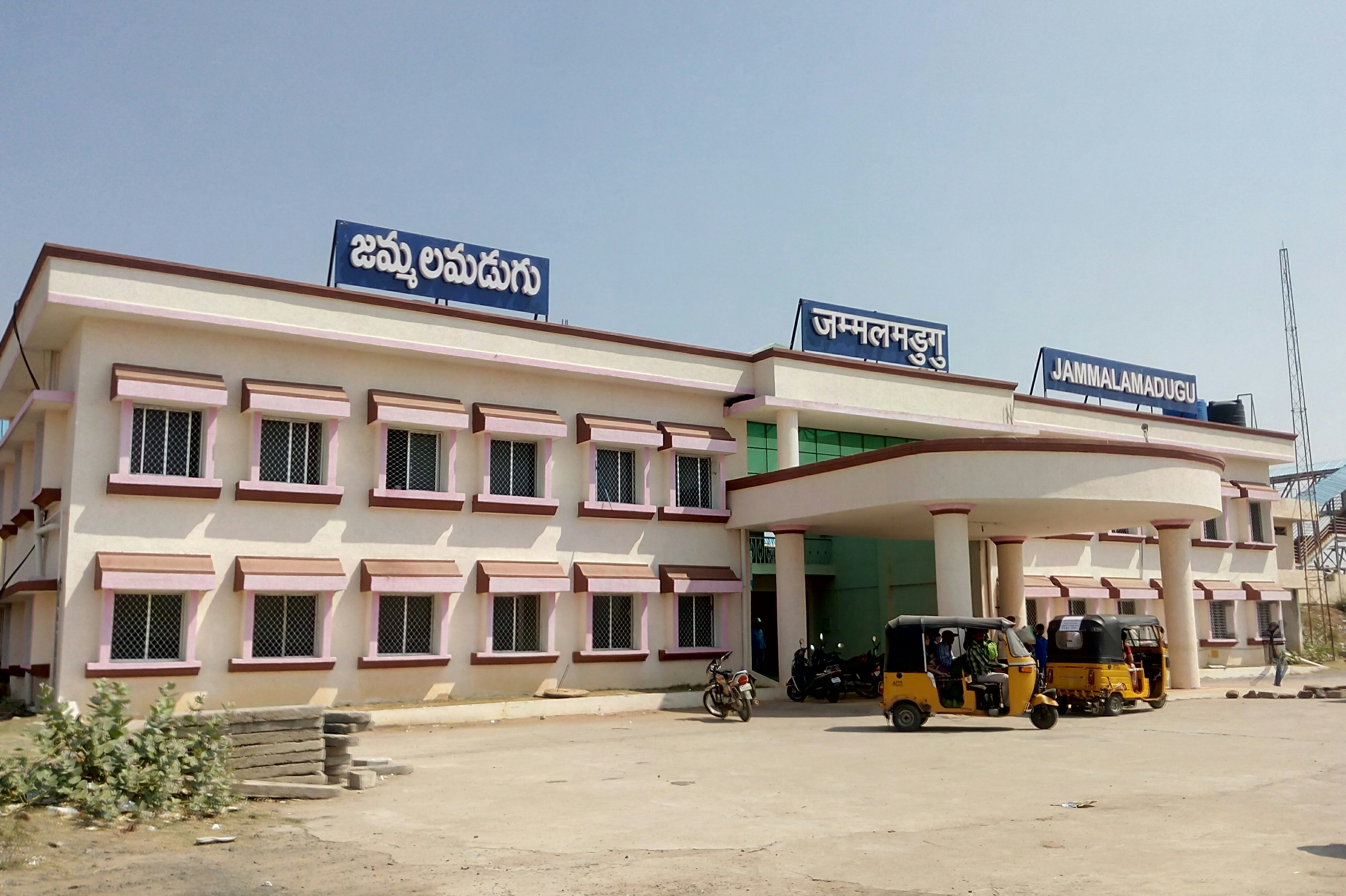
Jammalamadugu Railway Station Entrance

Jammalamadugu is a town in Municipality and Revenue Division in YSR Kadapa district of the Indian state of Andhra Pradesh. It is in Jammalamadugu mandal of Jammalamadugu revenue division. It has many old historical sites and one of the top tourist destination in Andhra Pradesh.

== Geography ==
Jammalamadugu is at 14.83°N 78.4°E. It has an average elevation of 169 metres (554 feet).

== Demographics ==
As of 2001 India census, Jammalamadugu had a population of 46,000 approximately. Males constitute 49% of the population and females 51%. Jammalamadugu has an average literacy rate of 79.5%, higher than the national average of 59.5%: male literacy is 85%, and female literacy is 74%. 11% of the population is under 6 years of age.

== Transport ==
Jammalamadugu is on National Highway 67 (India). Daily bus services are available to Hyderabad, Bangalore, Chennai, Vijayawada and Kadapa.

Jammalamadugu railway station is on the Nandyal–Yerraguntla section. It falls under the jurisdiction of Guntakal railway division.
