= Proddatur railway station =

Railway station in Andhra Pradesh, India

Proddatur railway station ప్రొద్దుటూరు
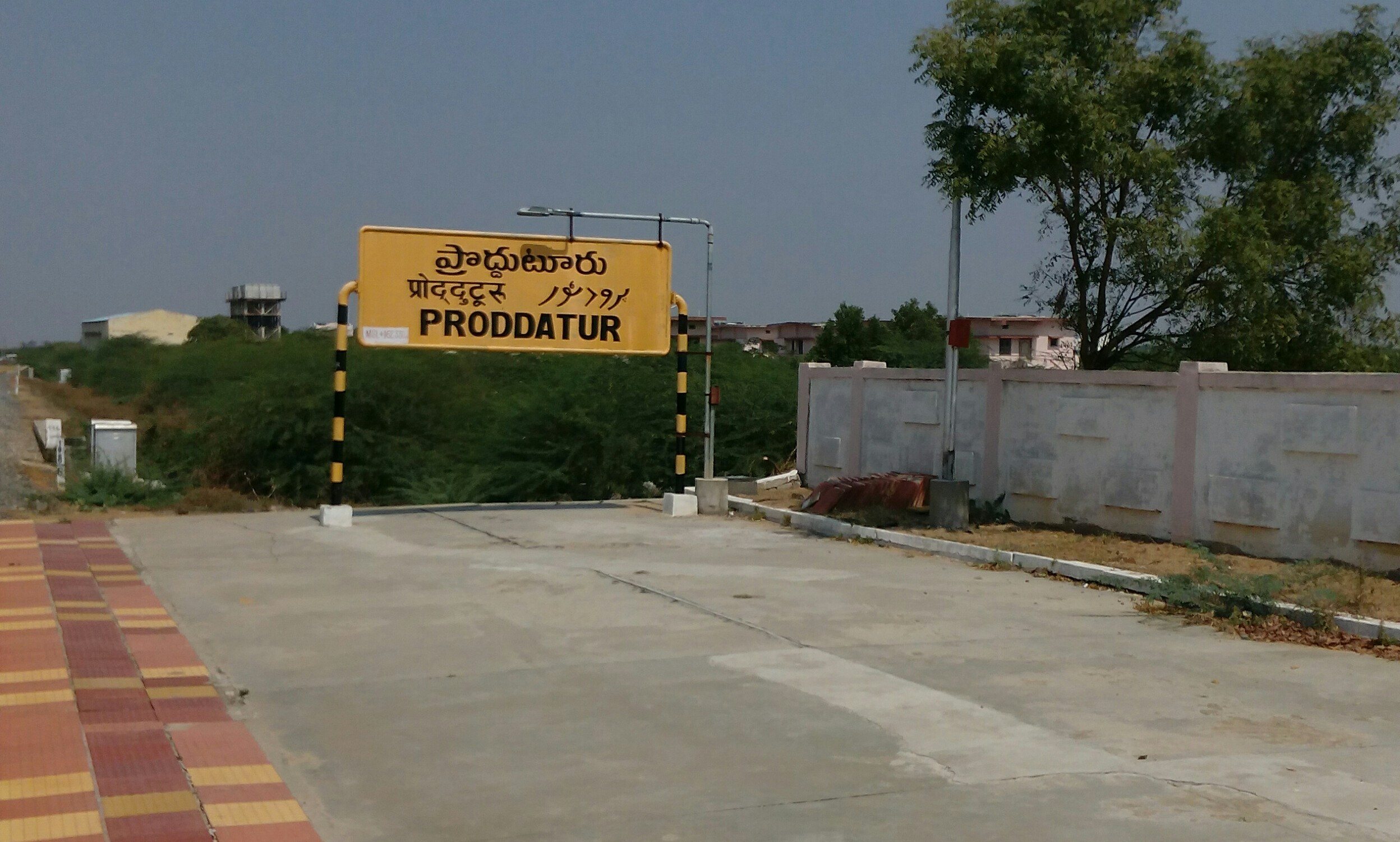
- Proddatur railway station sign board

General information
- Location: Proddatur, Kadapa district, Andhra Pradesh; India
- Coordinates: 14.75°N 78.55°E
- System: Express train and Passenger train station
- Owner: Indian Railways
- Operator: Guntakal(gtl)
- Line: Nandyal–Yerraguntla section
- Platforms: 2
- Tracks: 4

Construction
- Structure type: Elevated
- Parking: not available
- Accessible: Disabled access

Other information
- Status: functioning
- Station code: PRDT
- Fare zone: South Coast Railway zone

History
- Opened: 2016; 10 years ago
Location
- Location within Andhra Pradesh Location within India

Proddatur railway station is the primary railway station serving Proddatur city in the Indian state of Andhra Pradesh. The station comes under the jurisdiction of Guntakal railway division of the South Coast Railway zone.

== Structure and amenities ==
The station has roof top solar panels installed by the Indian railways, along with various railway stations and service buildings in the country, as a part of sourcing 500 MW solar energy.
