= Krishna railway station =

Railway station in Telangana, India

Krishna
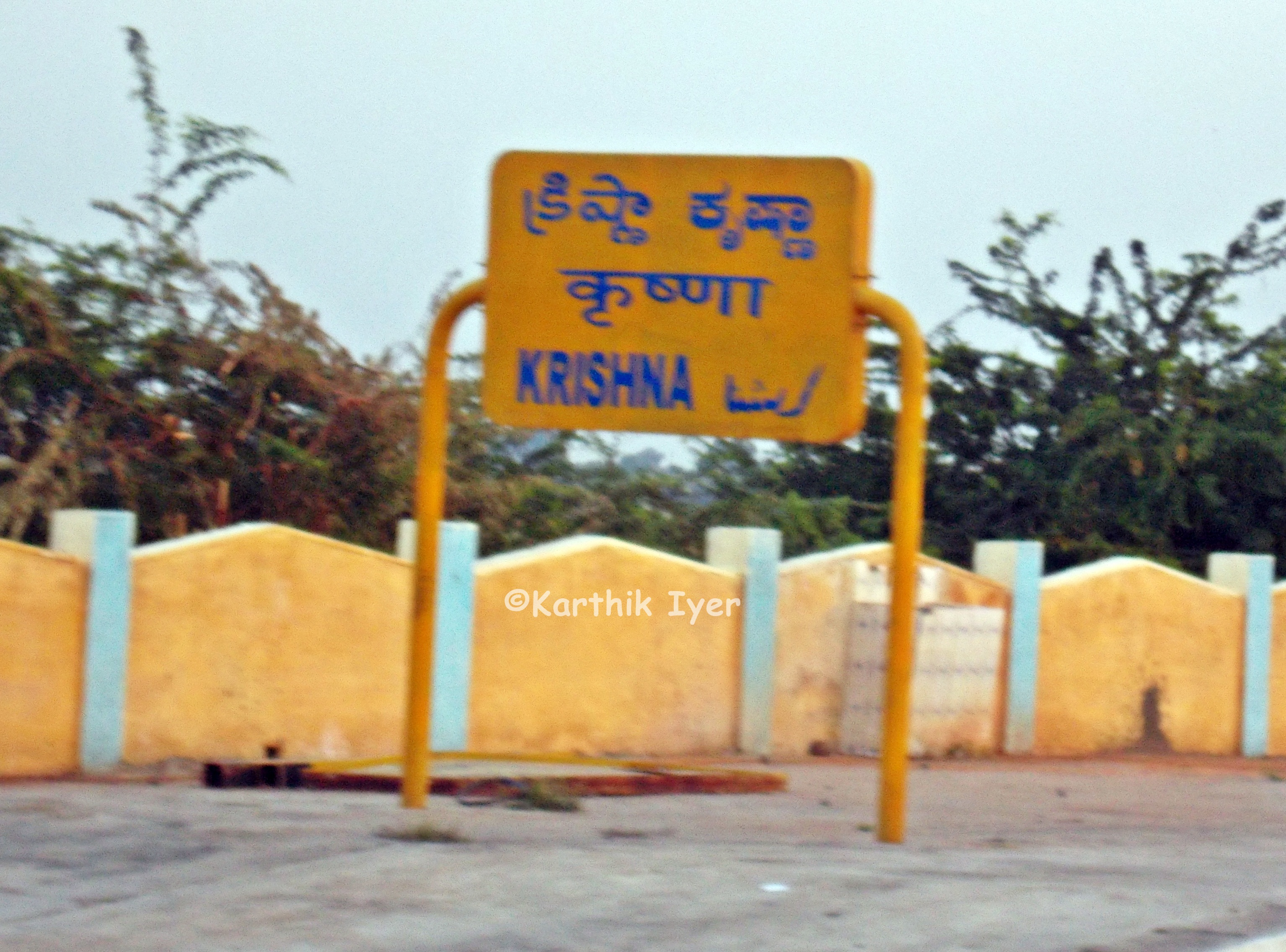
- Krishna station sign

General information
- Location: Narayanpet district, Krishna Mandal , Telangana; India
- Coordinates: 16°24′33.55″N 77°19′42.82″E
- System: Indian Railways station
- Operator: Indian Railways
- Lines: Solapur–Guntakal section Mahabubnagar-Munirabad line
- Platforms: 2

Services
Preceding station	Indian Railways	Following station
Chegunta towards ?	Solapur–Guntakal section	Yadlapur towards ?
Location
- Location within Telangana Location within India

Krishna Railway Station is located in Narayanpet district of Telangana and falls under the jurisdiction of Guntakal railway division of South Central Railway zone. The station forms a part of Mahbubnagar and Munirabad section. Neighbourhood stations are Chegunta, Saidapur, Yadlapur. Nearby major railway station is Secunderabad Junction another nearby major railway station is Raichur and airport is Rajiv Gandhi International Airport. A total of 16 express trains stop at this station. It is an important station for people in rural areas of neighbouring small villages such as Chegunta, Yadlapur. A lot of native Telugu people of this area are migrated to neighbouring Maharashtra they visit their native villages occasionally.

== Transportation facility ==
Here auto rickshaws and TSRTC buses are available.

== See also ==
- Solapur–Guntakal section
