= Jammalamadugu railway station =

Railway station in Andhra Pradesh, India

Jammalamadugu
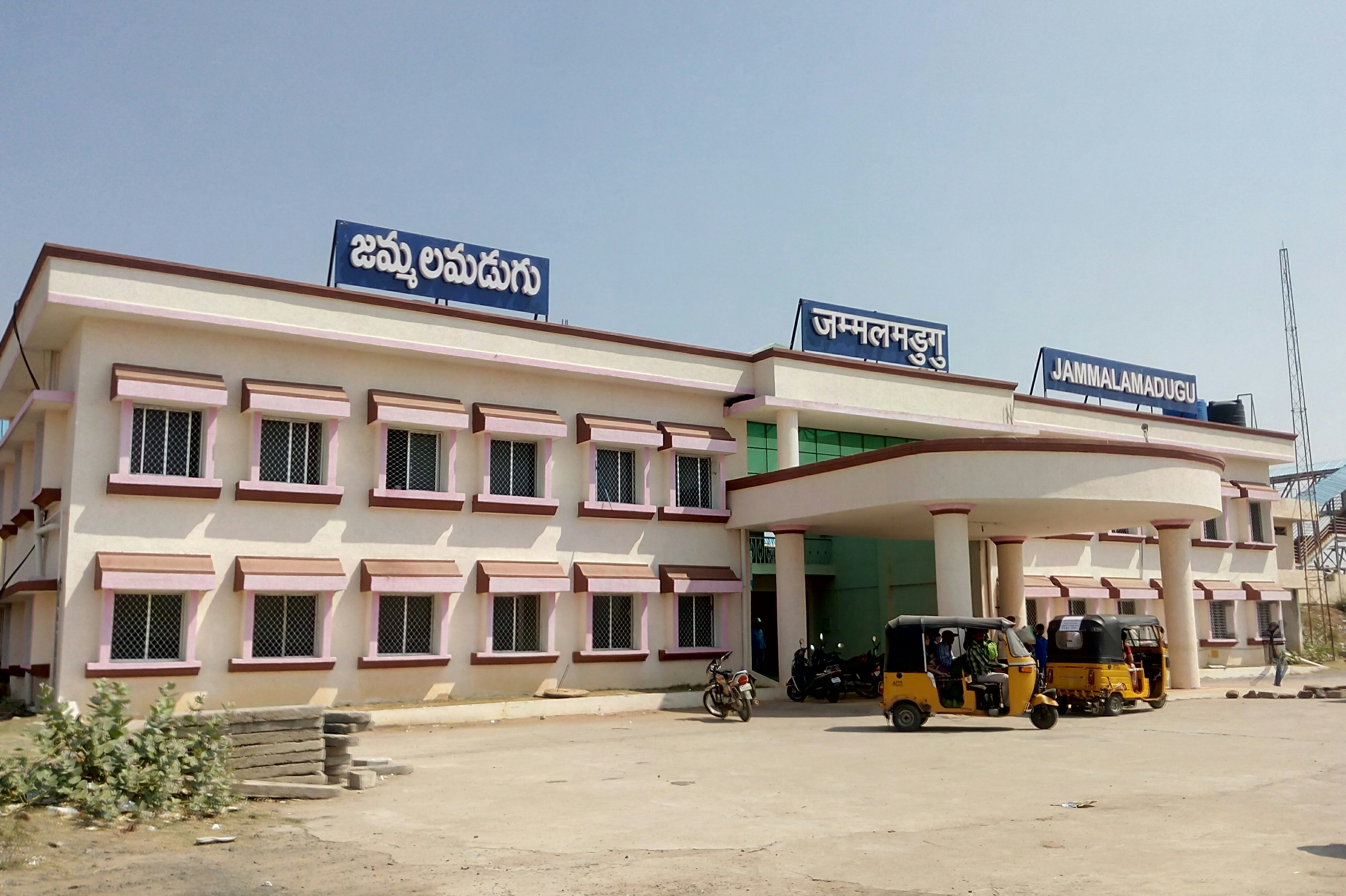
- Jammalamadugu railway station entrance

General information
- Location: Jammalamadugu, YSR Kadapa district, Andhra Pradesh; India
- Coordinates: 14.85°N 78.38°E
- System: Indian Railways station
- Owner: Indian Railways
- Operator: Guntakal
- Line: Nandyal–Yerraguntla section
- Platforms: 2
- Tracks: 3

Construction
- Structure type: On-ground
- Parking: available
- Accessible: Disabled access

Other information
- Status: Functional
- Station code: JMDG
- Fare zone: South Central Railway zone

History
- Opened: 2016; 10 years ago
Location
- Location within Andhra Pradesh

Jammalamadugu railway station is the primary railway station serving Jammalamadugu town in the Indian state of Andhra Pradesh. The station comes under the jurisdiction of Guntakal railway division of South Central Railway zone. A new railway line connecting Nandyal of Kurnool district commissioned recently

== Structure and amenities ==
The station has roof top solar panels installed by the Indian railways, along with various railway stations and service buildings in the country, as a part of sourcing 500 MW solar energy.
