= Yerraguntla Junction railway station =

Railway station in Andhra Pradesh, India

Yerraguntla Junction
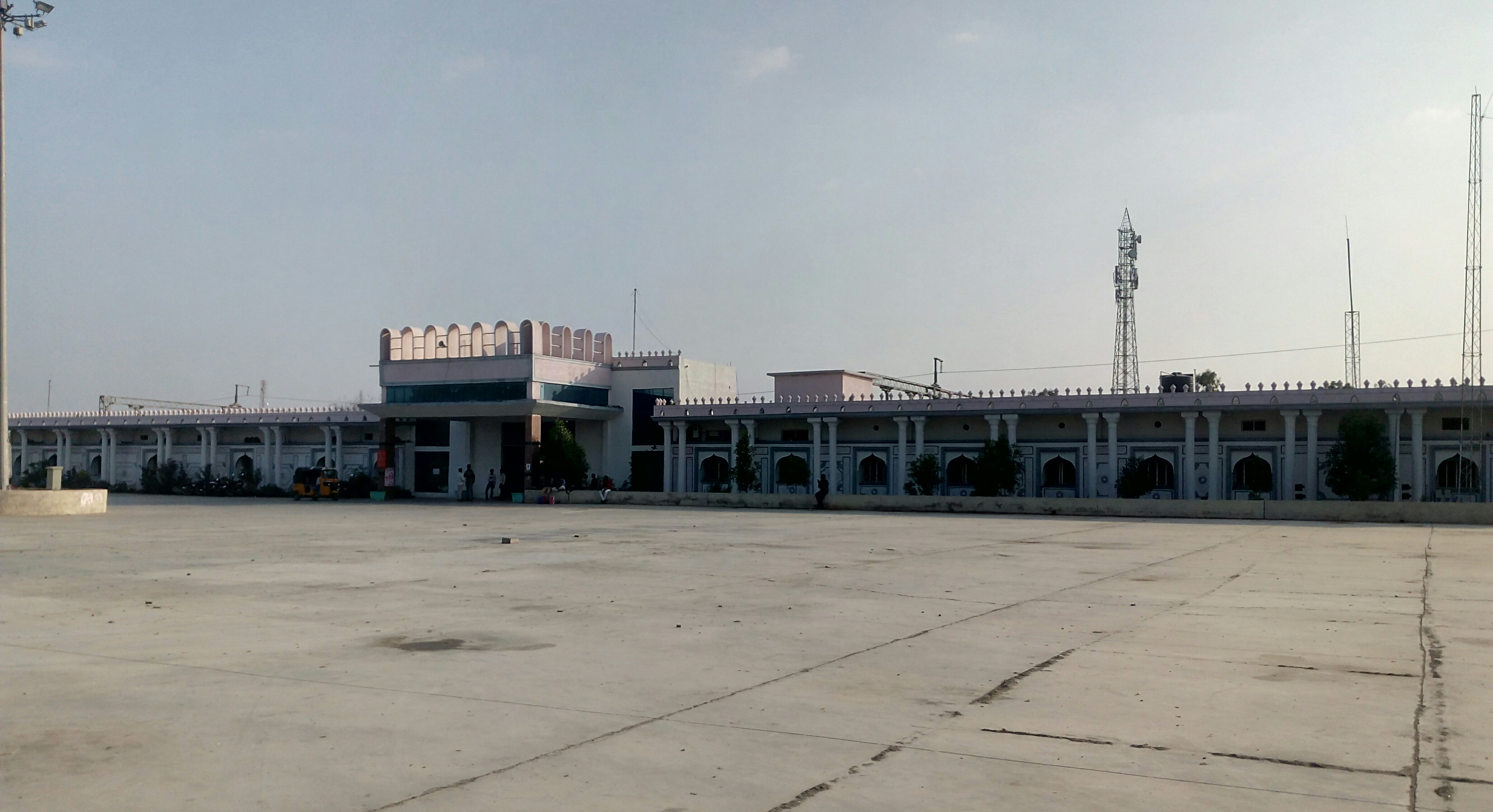
- Yerraguntla Junction main entrance

General information
- Location: Yerraguntla, YSR Kadapa district, Andhra Pradesh; India
- Coordinates: 14.6394°N 78.5349°E
- Elevation: 152 metres (499 ft)
- System: Express train and Passenger train station
- Owner: Indian Railways
- Operator: Guntakal
- Lines: Guntakal–Chennai Egmore section of Mumbai–Chennai line & Nandyal–Yerraguntla section
- Platforms: 2
- Tracks: 5

Construction
- Structure type: On-ground
- Parking: available
- Accessible: Disabled access

Other information
- Status: Functional
- Station code: YA
- Fare zone: South Central Railway zone

History
- Opened: 1866; 160 years ago
Location
- Location within Andhra Pradesh Location within India

Yerraguntla Junction railway station (station code:YA), is the primary railway station serving Yerraguntla town in the Indian state of Andhra Pradesh. The station falls under the jurisdiction of Guntakal railway division of South Central Railway zone. A new railway line connecting Nandyal of Kurnool district commissioned recently

== Station category ==
It is one of the 'D' category railway stations of Guntakal railway division.

== Gallery ==
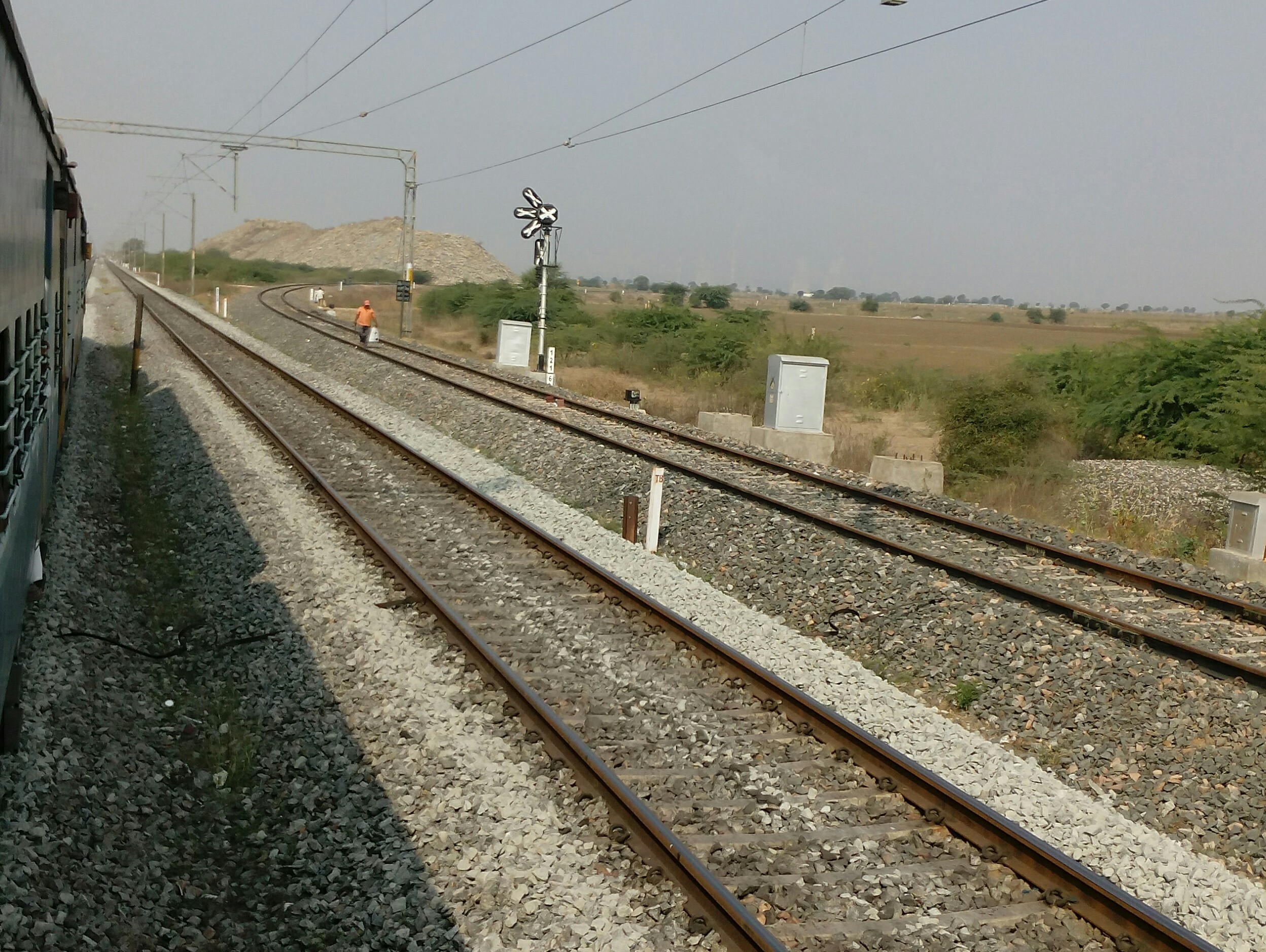
Track bifurcation towards Nandyal Junction

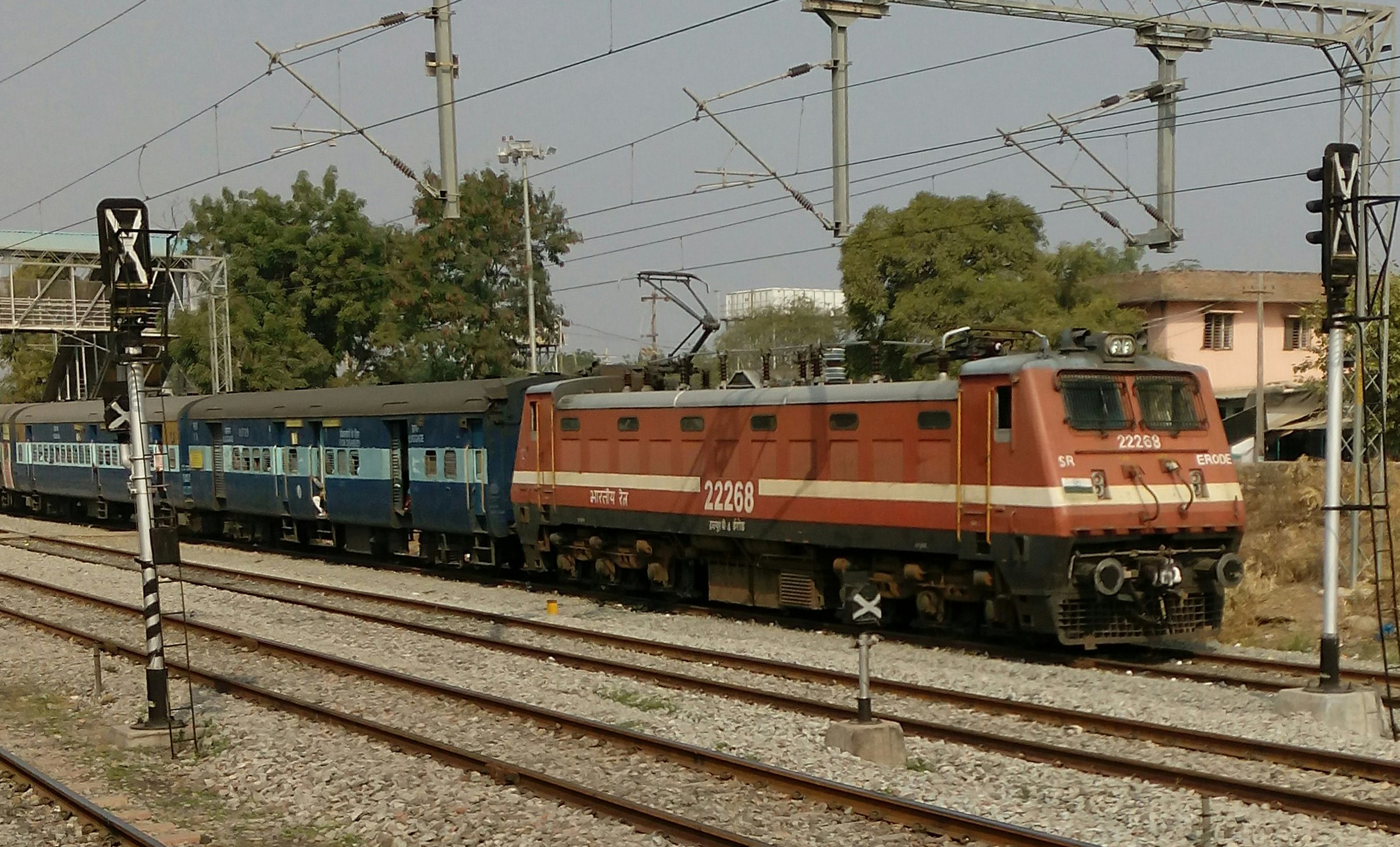
Mumbai–Chennai Express near Yerraguntla Junction
