= Thimmarajupally =

Coordinates: 15.54834°N 78.22972°E

Thimmarajupally Thimmarajupalle
- Village
- Interactive map of Thimmarajupally
- Location in Andhra Pradesh, India
- Country: India
- State: Andhra Pradesh
- District: YSR

Languages
  - Official: Telugu
- Time zone: UTC+5:30 (IST)
- PIN: 516151
- Vehicle registration: AP

Thimmarajupally, also known as Thimmarajupalle, is a village located in Nandalur sub-district, YSR district, Andhra Pradesh, India. As of the 2011 census, the village had no households or inhabitants.
