= Anantapur railway station =

Railway station in Andhra Pradesh, India

Anantapur
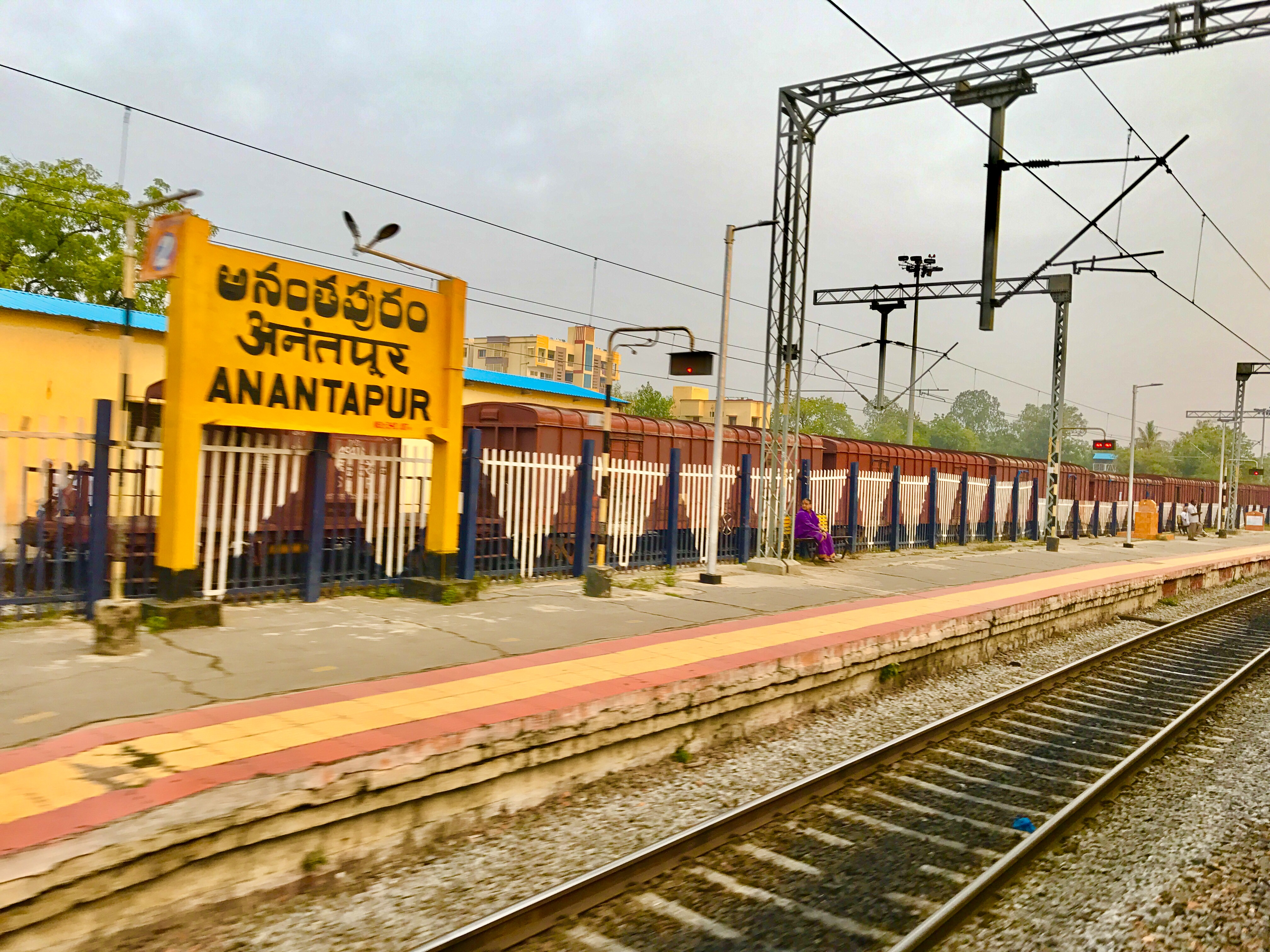
- Anantapur railway station

General information
- Location: Anantapur, Andhra Pradesh; India
- Coordinates: 14°41′10″N 77°35′42″E
- Elevation: 453 metres (1,486.2 ft)
- System: Indian Railways station
- Owner: Indian Railways
- Operator: South Coast Railway
- Line: Guntakal–Bangalore section
- Platforms: 4
- Tracks: 4

Construction
- Structure type: Standard on ground
- Parking: Yes
- Cycle facilities: No

Other information
- Status: Functioning
- Station code: ATP
- Division(s): Guntakal

History
- Opened: 1892–93
Location
- Location within Andhra Pradesh Location within India

Anantapur railway station (station code:ATP) is located in Anantapur district in the Indian state of Andhra Pradesh and serves Anantapur city. It lies on Guntakal–Bangalore section.

== History ==
The Guntakal–Bangalore line was opened in 1892–93. The metre-gauge Guntakal–Mysore Frontier Railway was opened in 1893. It was operated by Southern Mahrata Railway. Anantapur railway station was officially opened to traffic in 1892 as part of the Guntakal–Bangalore line. It played an important role in connecting Rayalaseema with Karnataka and became one of the key junctions for trade and passenger movement in the region.

== Electrification ==
The Gooty-Bangalore railway line was fully electrified and commissioned on 14 July 2016.

== Classification ==
Anantapur is classified as an NSG-3 station in the Guntakal railway division. Anantapur has been selected for the Adarsh Station Scheme, a scheme for upgradation of stations by the Indian Railways.

== Amenities ==
- Anantapur railway station has computerized reservation counters, waiting room, retiring room, non-vegetarian refreshment stall, light refreshment stall, tea stall and book stall.
- Anantapuram has 4 platforms and each can handle a train with more than 21 coaches. Daily 41 pairs of passenger trains pass through this station with halt times more than 2 minutes.
- The station is equipped with Automatic Ticket Vending Machines (ATVMs) and has been provided with free Wi-Fi under the Digital India initiative of Indian Railways. CCTV surveillance has also been installed for passenger safety.

== Passenger traffic ==
Anantapur railway station handles over 18,000 passengers daily, making it one of the busiest stations in the Guntakal division.

== Connectivity ==
The station is well connected by express and passenger trains to major cities such as Bangalore, Hyderabad, Chennai, Mumbai, and New Delhi. Prominent trains halting here include the Prasanthi Express, Karnataka Express, and Kondaveedu Express.
