= Kadapa railway station =

Railway station in Andhra Pradesh, India

Kadapa Junction
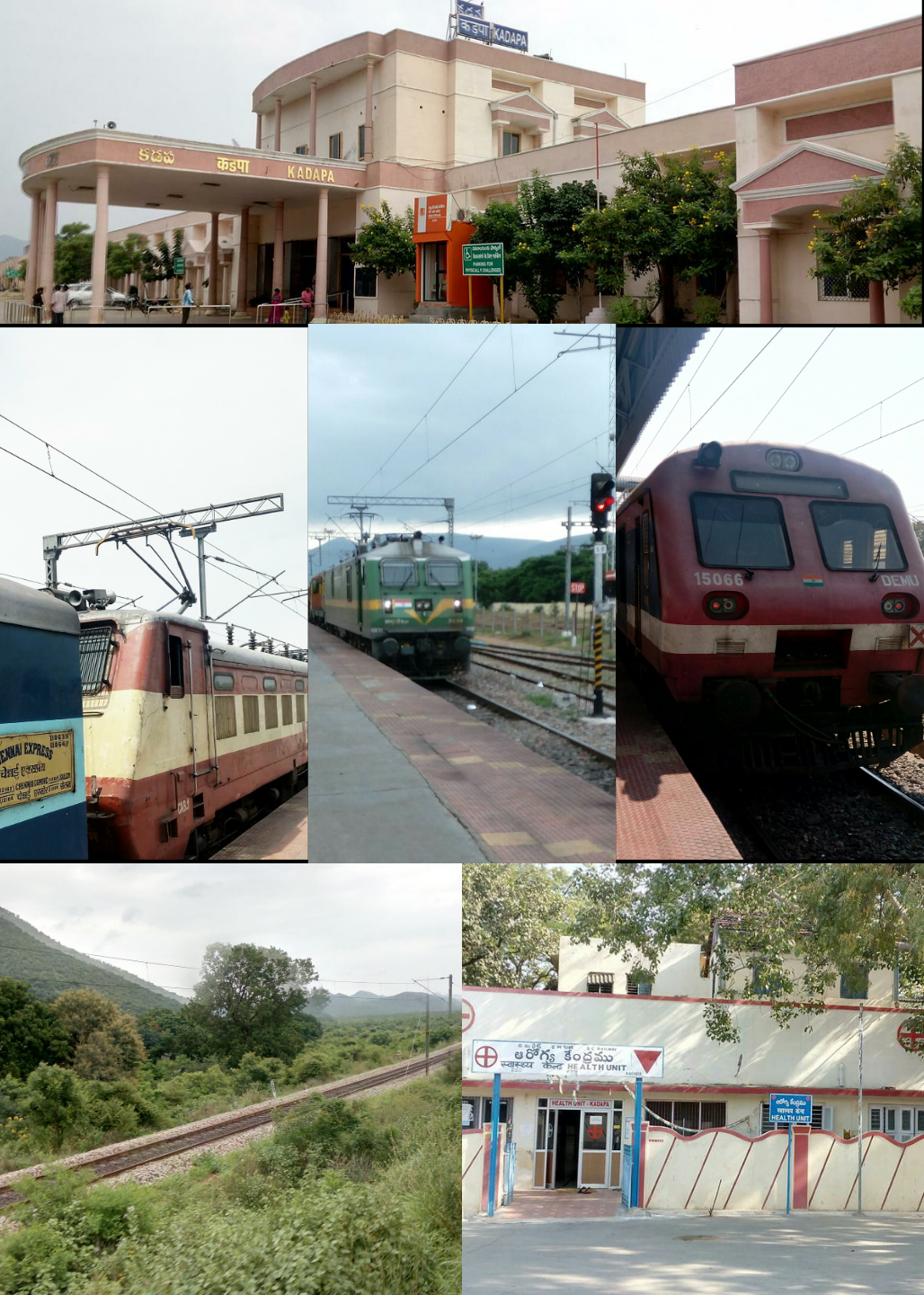
- Montage of Kadapa Railway station. Clockwise, from top to bottom: main entrance; 77402 Hx-Ndl DEMU; Railway Health Unit; scenic view near railway station; 12164 Ms-Dr SF Express halting on platform 3; a WAG-9 hauling freight entering railway station

General information
- Location: Kadapa, Andhra Pradesh; India
- Coordinates: 14.4513°N 78.8288°E
- Elevation: 146 metres (479 ft)
- System: Regional rail, Light rail & Goods railway station
- Owner: Indian Railways
- Lines: Guntakal–Chennai Egmore section of Mumbai–Chennai line and Kadapa–Bangalore section (operational up to Pendlimarri)
- Platforms: 3
- Tracks: 5

Construction
- Structure type: On-ground
- Parking: Available
- Accessible: Disabled access

Other information
- Status: Functional
- Station code: HX
- Fare zone: South Coast Railway zone Guntakal railway division

History
- Opened: 1866
Location
- Location within Andhra Pradesh Location within India

Kadapa Junction railway station (station code: HX) is the primary railway station serving the town of Kadapa in YSR Kadapa district, Andhra Pradesh, India. The station falls under the jurisdiction of Guntakal railway division of South Coast Railways. The station has three platforms. The station is in Guntakal–Chennai Egmore section of the Mumbai–Chennai line.

== History ==
Kadapa has its own railway station in the city, opened before independence (1866). The Mumbai–Chennai line, one of the busiest lines in the south coast region, passes through Kadapa railway station. It is one of the A-category railway stations in South Coast Railway zone with three platforms and five tracks under the Guntakal railway division.

== Performance and earnings ==
The table below shows the passenger earnings of the station.

Passenger earnings
Year	Earnings (in lakhs)
2011–12	₹1,102.19 lakh (equivalent to ₹23 crore or US$2.4 million in 2023)
2012–13	₹1,156.26 lakh (equivalent to ₹22 crore or US$2.3 million in 2023)
2013–14	₹1,464.06 lakh (equivalent to ₹25 crore or US$2.6 million in 2023)
2014–15	₹1,580.03 lakh (equivalent to ₹25 crore or US$2.6 million in 2023)

== Originating trains ==
The following are the originating trains from the station.

- 07521 Kadapa–Guntakal Express Special
- 66006 Kadapa–Arakkonam MEMU
- 18521 Tirumala Express (Now Extended to Guntakal)

== Kadapa-Bangalore railway project ==
The Kadapa–Bangalore broad-gauge railway line is intended to connect Kadapa to Bangalore in Karnataka via Kolar, enhancing Kadapa connectivity. Initiated on September 2, 2010, the 260.4 km line is divided into four phases: Kadapa–Rayachoti, Rayachoti–Madanapalle, Madanapalle–Mulbagal, and Mulbagal–Bangalore.
