= Nandyal Junction railway station =

Railway Station in Andhra Pradesh

Nandyal Junction
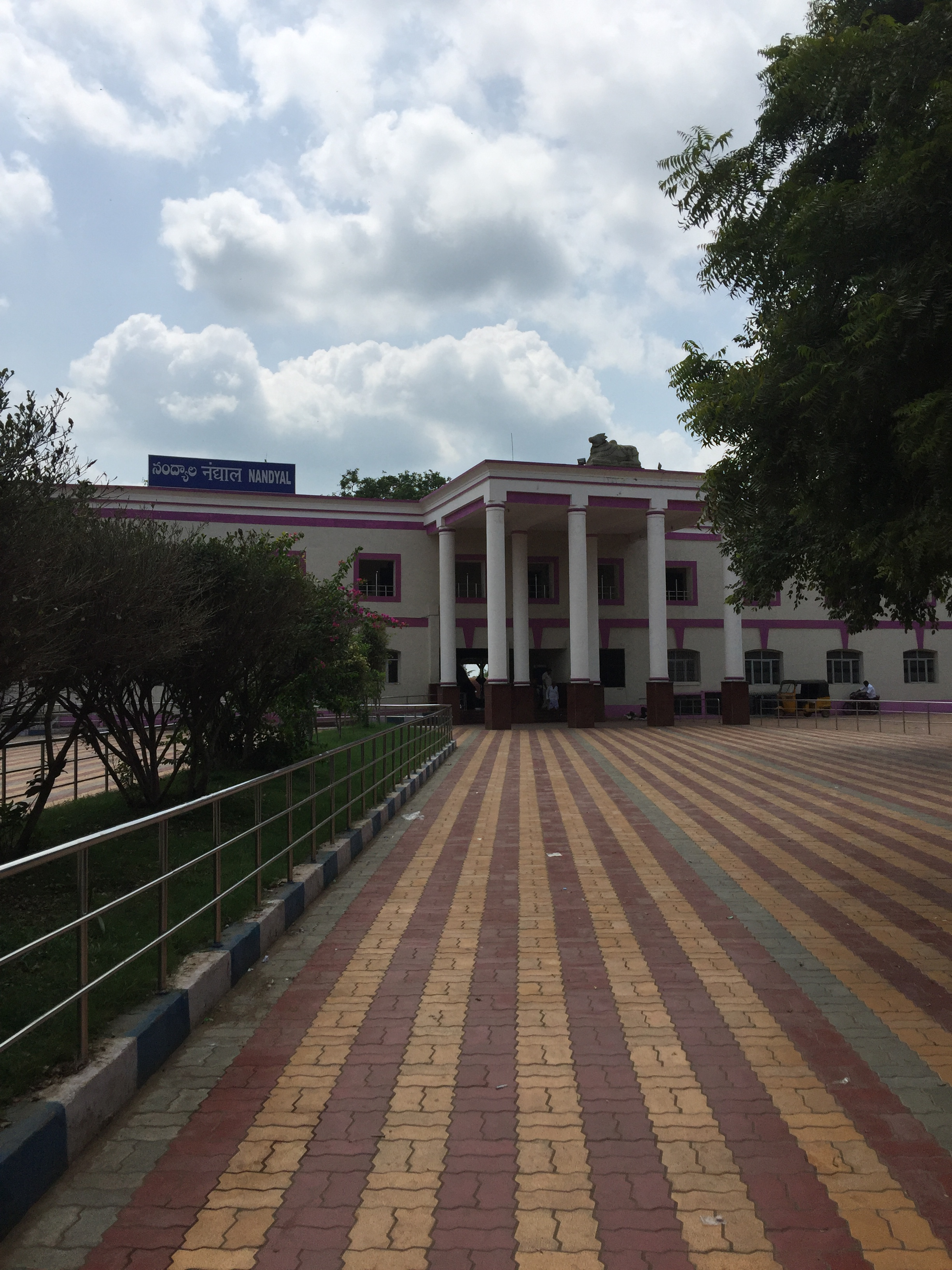
- Nandyal Junction main entrance

General information
- Location: National Highway 40, Nandyal, Nandyal district, Andhra Pradesh; India
- Coordinates: 15°28′48″N 78°28′48″E
- System: Indian Railways station
- Owner: Indian Railways
- Operator: Indian Railways
- Lines: Nallapadu–Nandyal section Nandyal–Yerraguntla section Guntakal–Nandyal section
- Platforms: 3
- Tracks: 5 ft 6 in (1,676 mm) broad gauge

Construction
- Structure type: Standard (on ground)
- Accessible: Disabled access

Other information
- Status: Active
- Station code: NDL
- Zone(s): South Coast Railway
- Division(s): Guntur
- Classification: B

Passengers
- 25000

Services
Preceding station	Indian Railways	Following station
Terminus	South Coast Railway zone Nallapadu–Nandyal section	? Terminus
Terminus	South Coast Railway zone Nandyal–Yerraguntla section	? Terminus
Terminus	South Coast Railway zone Guntakal–Nandyal section	? Terminus
Location
- Location within India Location within Andhra Pradesh

Nandyal Junction railway station (station code: NDL) is an Indian Railways station in Nandyal of Andhra Pradesh. It is situated on Nallapadu–Nandyal section of Guntur railway division in South Coast Railway zone. It is one of the stations in the division to be equipped with Automatic Ticket Vending Machines (ATVMs).

Passengers can see a huge Nandi statue in entrace of the Nandyal railway station, symbolizing the cultural and religious significance of the city. Mahanandi, one of the nava nandi's of Nandyal, is 18.5 KM from the Nandyal railway station. Also Srisailam, a jyotirlinga is 162 KM from the Nandyal Junction railway station.

Nandyal railway station is the only nearest station (63.4 km) to holy site of Ahobilam, the only place in India where all nine forms Nava Narasimha is found.

The route also passes through the Bogadha and Chalama tunnels.

== Trains passing through Nandyal Railway Junction ==
Train No.	Train Name	Running	Route
18463/18464	Prashanti Express	All days	Bhubaneswar (BBS) ↔ KSR Bengaluru (SBC) via GNTL, NDL, BZA, VSKP
17225/17226	Amaravati Express	All days	SSS Hubballi (UBL) ↔ Narsapur (NS) via BAY, GNTL, NDL, BZA, BVRT
17261/17262	Guntur–Tirupati Express	All days	Guntur (GNT) ↔ Tirupati (TPTY) via CBM, NDL, PRDT, YA, HX, RU
17251/17252	Guntur ↔ Kacheguda Express	All days	Guntur (GNT) ↔ Kacheguda (KCG) via CBM, NDL, DHNE, KRNT, MBNR
17215/17216	Machilipatnam–Dharmavaram Express	All days	Machilipatnam ↔ Dharmavaram via GDV, BZA, CBM, NDL, BGNP, KLKA, JMDG, PRDT, YA, TU, GYF, ATP
17329/17330	Hubballi ↔ Vijayawada Express	All days	SSS Hubballi (UBL) ↔ Vijayawada (BZA) via GDG, HPT, GNTL, DHNE, NDL, GNT
17253/17254	Guntur ↔ Chhatrapati Sambhaji Nagar Express	All days	Guntur (GNT) ↔ Chhatrapati Sambhaji Nagar (CSPN) via CBM, NDL, KRNT, KCG, VKB, PBN
17227/17228	Dhone ↔ Guntur Express	All days	Dhone (DHNE) ↔ Guntur (GNT) via BMH, NDL, GID, CBM, VKN
57407/57408	Guntakal ↔ Markapur Passenger	All days	Guntakal ↔ Markapur via GNTL, DHNE, NDL, GID
18047/18048	Amaravati Express	18047→ Mon, Wed, Thur, Sat 18048→ Tue, Thur, Fri, Sun (Indicated w.r.t NDL Junction)	Shalimar ↔ Vasco da Gama, Goa via KGP, BBS, VSKP, BZA, NDL, GNTL, UBL, LD
17211/17212	Kondaveedu Express	17211 → Mon, Wed, Fri 17212→ Tue, Thur, Sat (Indicated w.r.t NDL Junction)	Machilipatnam ↔ Yesvantpur via BZA, CBM, NDL, DHNE, GY, DMM, SSPN, HUP
22831/22832	Howrah ↔ Yesvantpur Superfast Express	(Weekly) 22831 → Mon 22832 → Fri (Indicated w.r.t NDL Junction)	Howrah ↔ Yesvantpur KGP, BBS, DVD, BZA, NDL, GY, ATP, DMM, SSPN, YNK
22883/22884	Puri–Yesvantpur Garib Rath Express	(Weekly) 22883 → Sat 22884 → Sun (Indicated w.r.t NDL Junction)	Puri ↔ Yesvantpur via KUR, PSA, CHE, VSKP, RJY, BZA, NDL, DMM, HUP

== Originating express trains ==
Train No.	Train Name	Destination	Departure	Running	Route
77210	Nandyal - Kurnool City DEMU	Kurnool City	06:15 AM	All Days	Panyam, Bethamcherla, Dhone.
77211	Nandyal - Renigunta DEMU Express	Renigunta	06:00 AM	All Days	Banaganapalle, Koilakuntla, Jammalamadugu, Proddatur, Yerraguntla and Kadapa.
