= Nandyal–Yerraguntla section =

Railway line in Andhra Pradesh, India

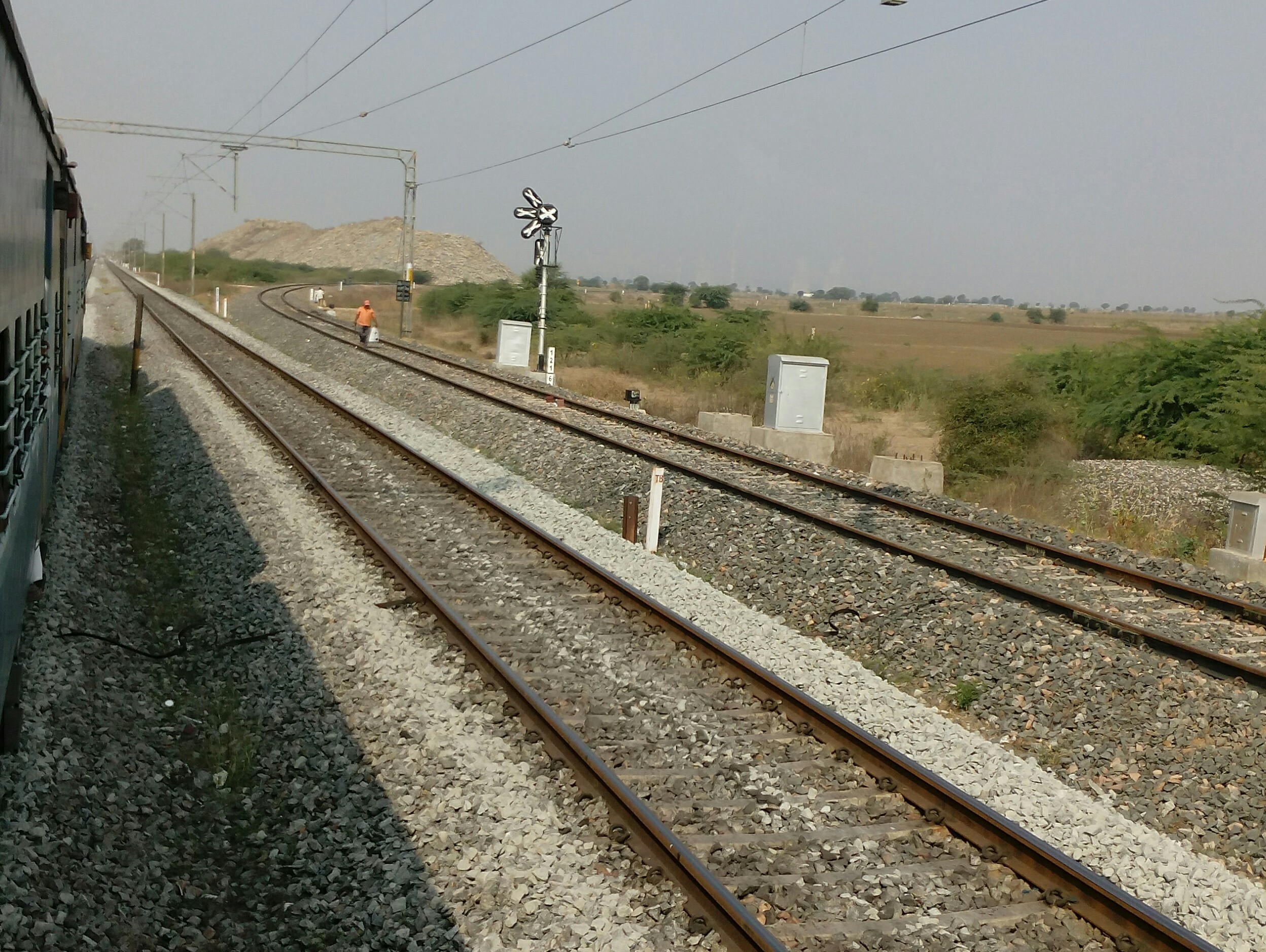
- Track Bifurcation towards Nandyal Junction

Overview
- Status: Operational
- Owner: Indian Railways
- Locale: Andhra Pradesh
- Termini: Nandyal; Yerraguntla Junction

Service
- Operator: South Coast Railway

History
- Opened: 23 August 2016

Technical
- Line length: 123 km (76 mi)
- Number of tracks: 1
- Track gauge: 5 ft 6 in (1,676 mm) broad gauge
- Electrification: Yes
- Operating speed: 110 km/h (68 mph)
Route map
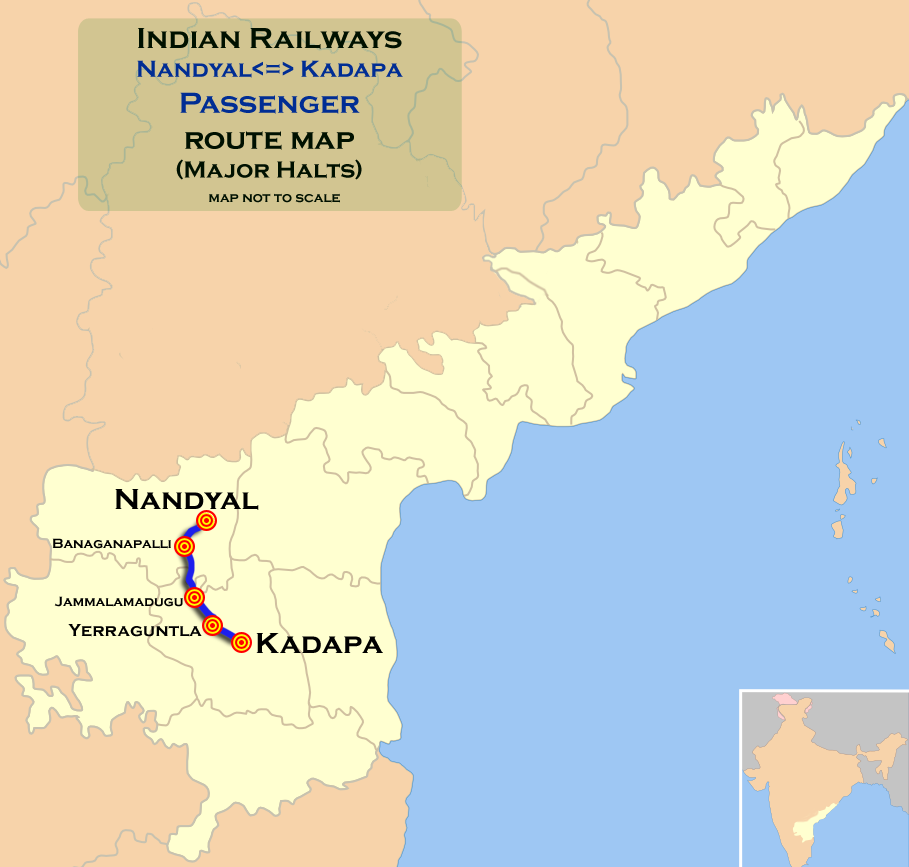

Nandyal–Yerraguntla section connects Nandyal of Nandyal district and Yerraguntla of Kadapa district in the Indian state of Andhra Pradesh. Further, this section converges with Nallapadu–Nandyal section at Nandyal. It is administered under Guntakal railway division of South Coast Railway zone, except the Nandyal railway station which is under Guntur railway division. The total length of the section extends to a length of 123 km (76 mi). Banaganapalle, Koilakuntla, Jammalamadugu and Proddatur are the major towns through which the line passes.

== History ==
The railway section was sanctioned in the year 1996–97. It was commissioned on 23 August 2016 and total project was completed at a cost of ₹9,670 million (US$100 million).

== Train services ==
At present daily 3 pairs of Trains services operating in this section along with Freight Trains

- 77211 RU - NDL DEMU
- 17216 DMM - MTM Express
- 17262 TPTY - GNT Express
