= Guntakal railway division =

Railway division of India

Guntakal Railway Division
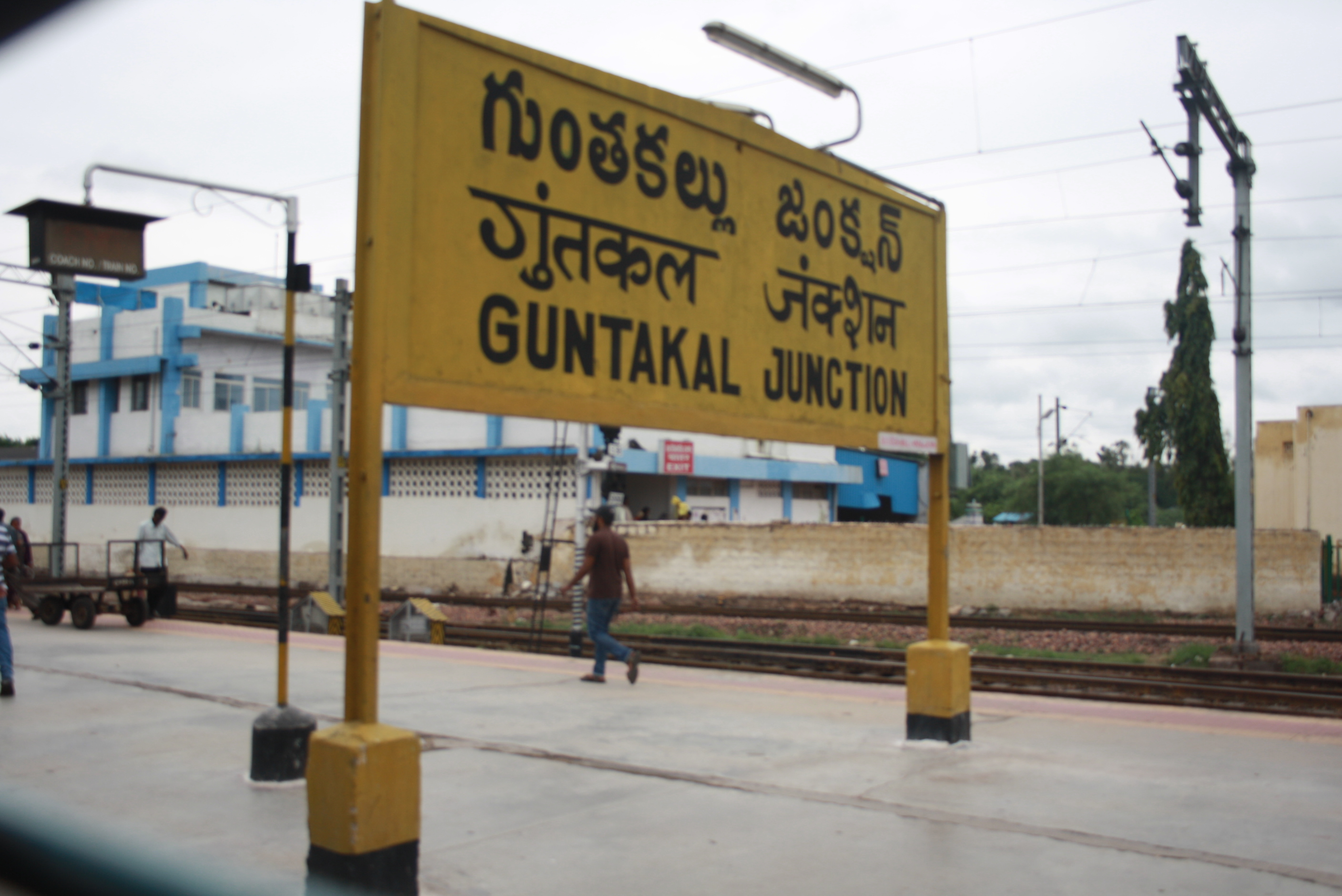
- Guntakal Junction railway station signboard

Overview
- Headquarters: Guntakal
- Reporting mark: GTL
- Locale: Andhra Pradesh, India
- Dates of operation: 1956; 70 years ago–
- Predecessor: SCR

Technical
- Track gauge: 1,676 mm (5 ft 6 in)
- Previous gauge: 1,000 mm (3 ft 3 3/8 in)
- Electrification: 25 kV AC, 50 Hz
- Length: 1,451.9 kilometres (902.2 mi)

Other
- Website: Official Website

Guntakal railway division is one of the four divisions of South Coast Railway zone (SCoR) of the Indian Railways. The headquarters of the division is at Guntakal.

== History ==
- In 1956, the Guntakal railway division was created as a part of the Southern Railway zone.
- On 2 October 1977, the Guntakal railway division was transferred to South Central Railway zone.
- In June 2026, the Guntakal railway division was transferred to South Coast Railway zone.

== Jurisdiction ==
It covers the states of Andhra Pradesh, Karnataka and Tamil Nadu, Telangana.

- In Andhra Pradesh it covers a total distance of 1302.9 route km.
- In Karnataka it covers a total distance of 142.2 route km.
- In Tamil Nadu it covers a total distance of 6.86 route

=== Sections and branch lines ===
The division has the largest broad-gauge route of 1,430.01 km (888.57 mi) and also has the second largest running track of 1,872.47 km (1,163.50 mi) in the South Central Railway zone.

The lines and sections under the jurisdiction of the Guntakal division are listed below:

Route	Type of track	Traction	Route (km.)
Guntakal–Raichur(Excl) (km 443.06-562.00)	Double	Electric	119
Guntakal–Dhone section (km 365.66-297.12)	Double	Electric	68.54
Dhone–Nandyal section(Excl) (km 297.12-256.98)	Double	Electric	40.14
Nandyal–Yerraguntla section	Single	Electric	123.00
Guntakal-Bellary(Excl) (km 253.45-208.06)	Double	Electric	45.39
Guntakal–Renigunta section (km 443.06-134.78)	Single	Electric	308.28
Guntakal-Dharmavaram	Double	Electric	101.28
Dharmavarm–Pakala branch line	Single	Electric	227.42
Gudur–Katpadi branch line	Double & Single	Electric	198.00
Gooty-Pendekallu	Single	Electric	29.275
Gooty-Kalluru (km 269.04-239.54)	Double	Electric	29.50
Kadapa-Pendlimarri section	Single	Diesel	21.8
Total			1346.815

- Guntakal Division System map

Note:

- excl.– Station excluded / not under the divisional jurisdiction
- km– Kilometer measure of distance between two lines

=== Stations and categories ===
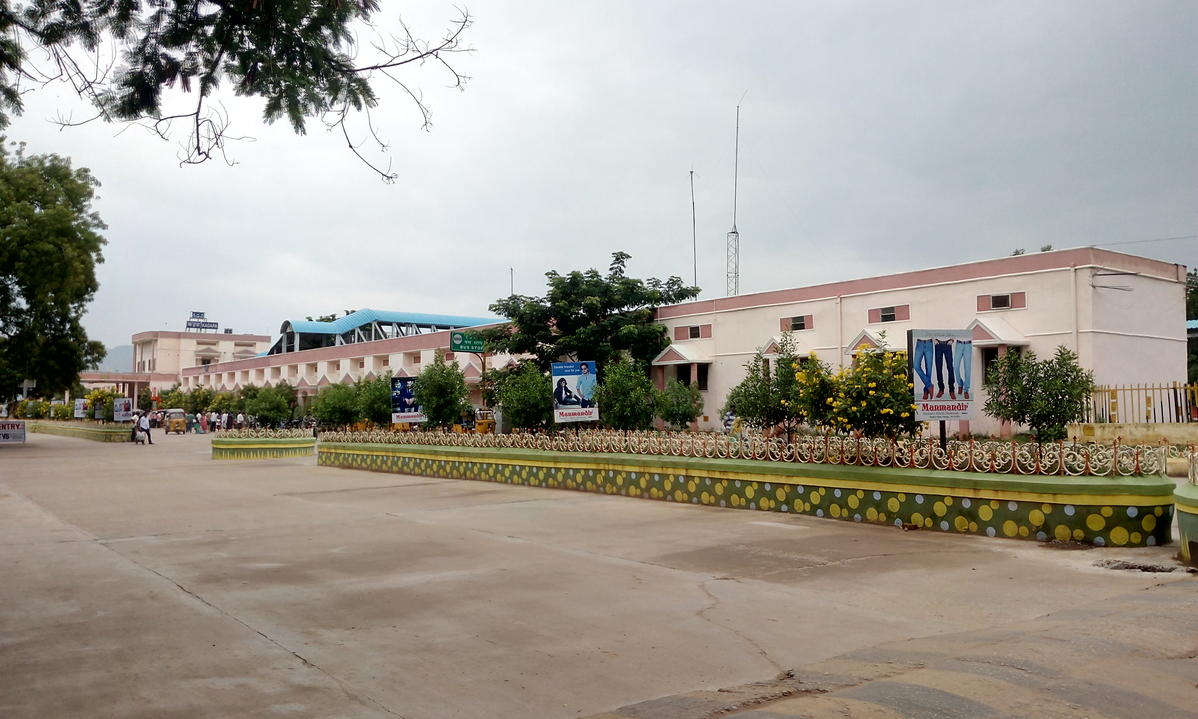
Kadapa railway station premises

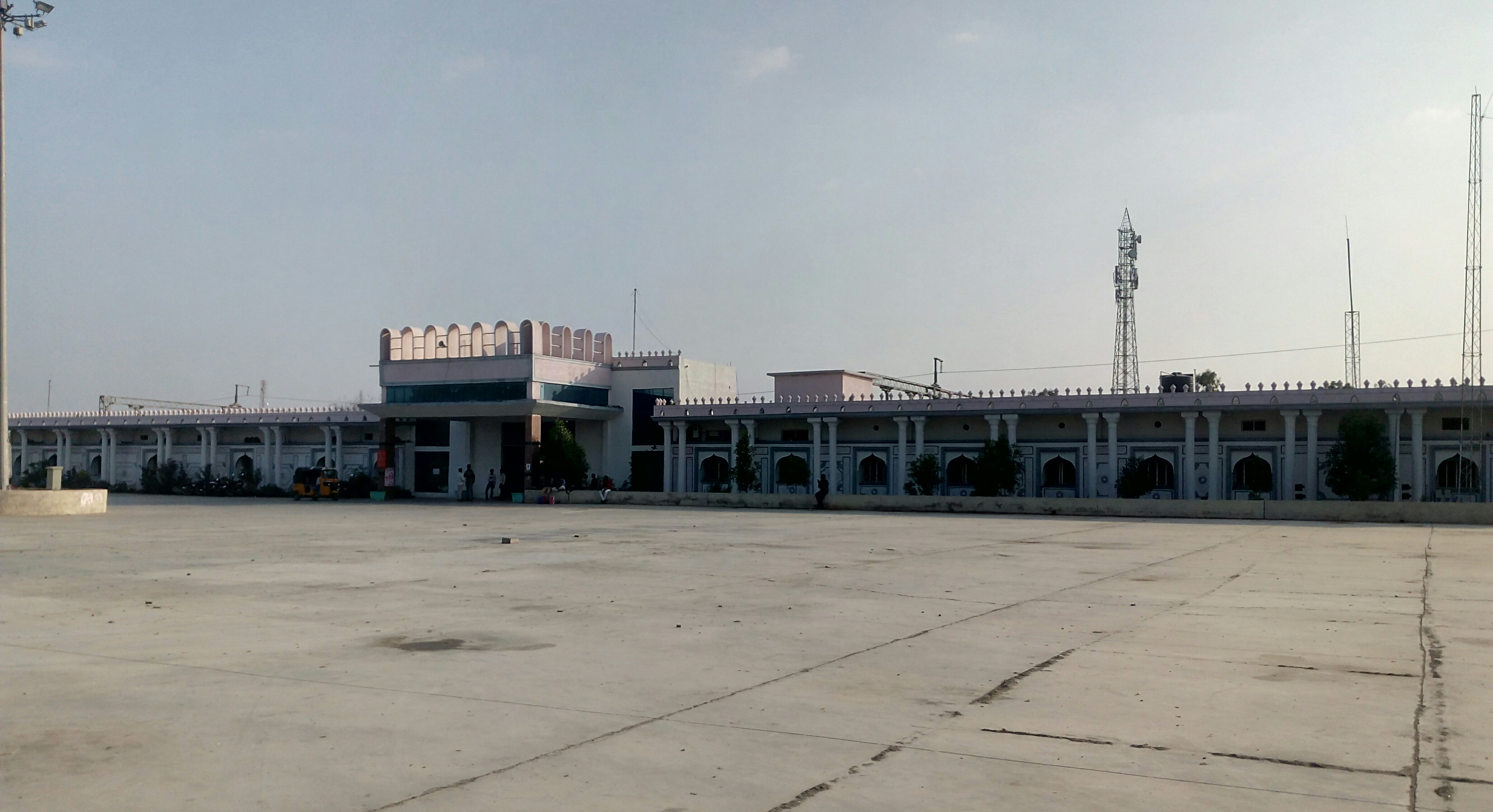
Long view of Yerraguntla Junction station building

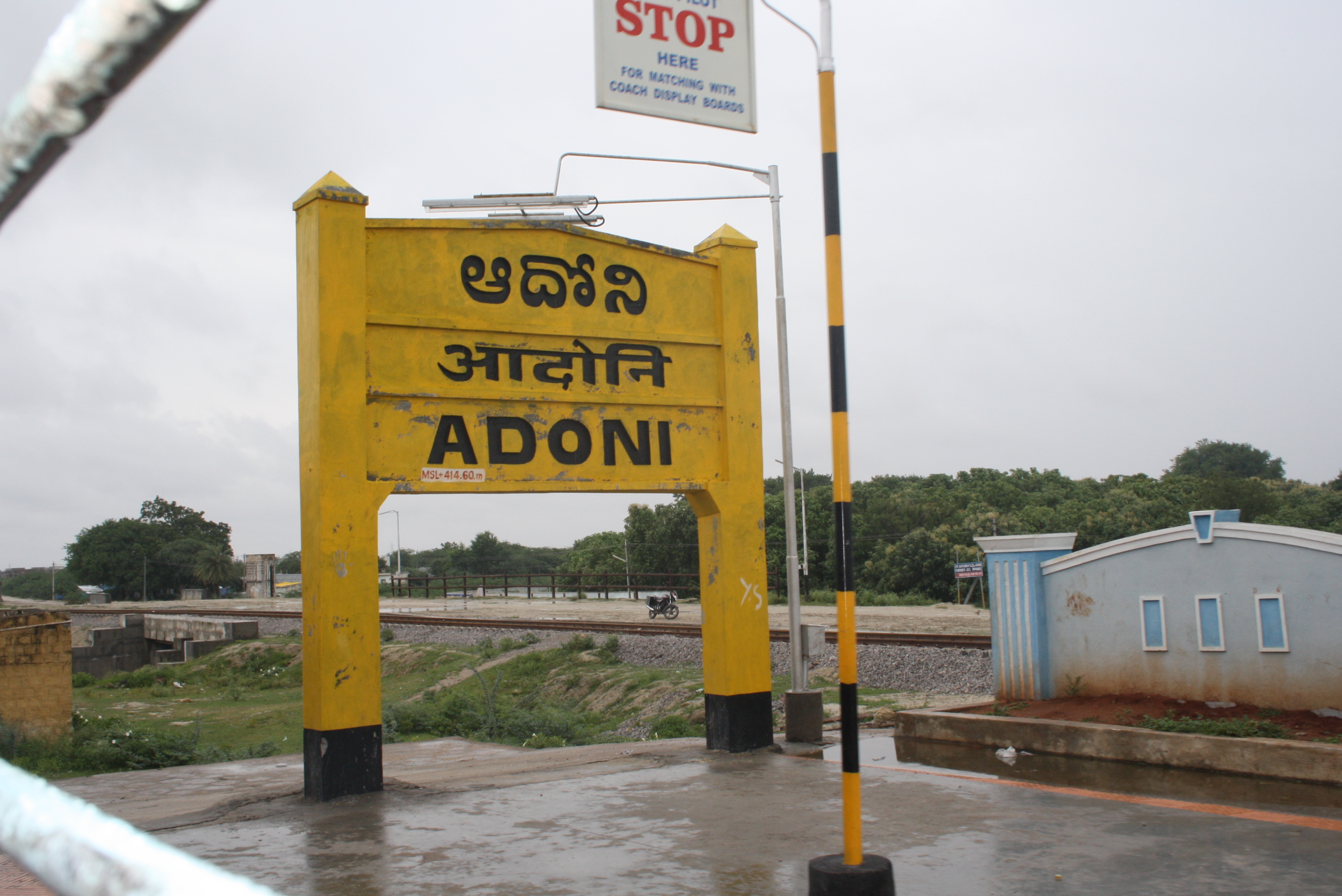
Adoni railway station

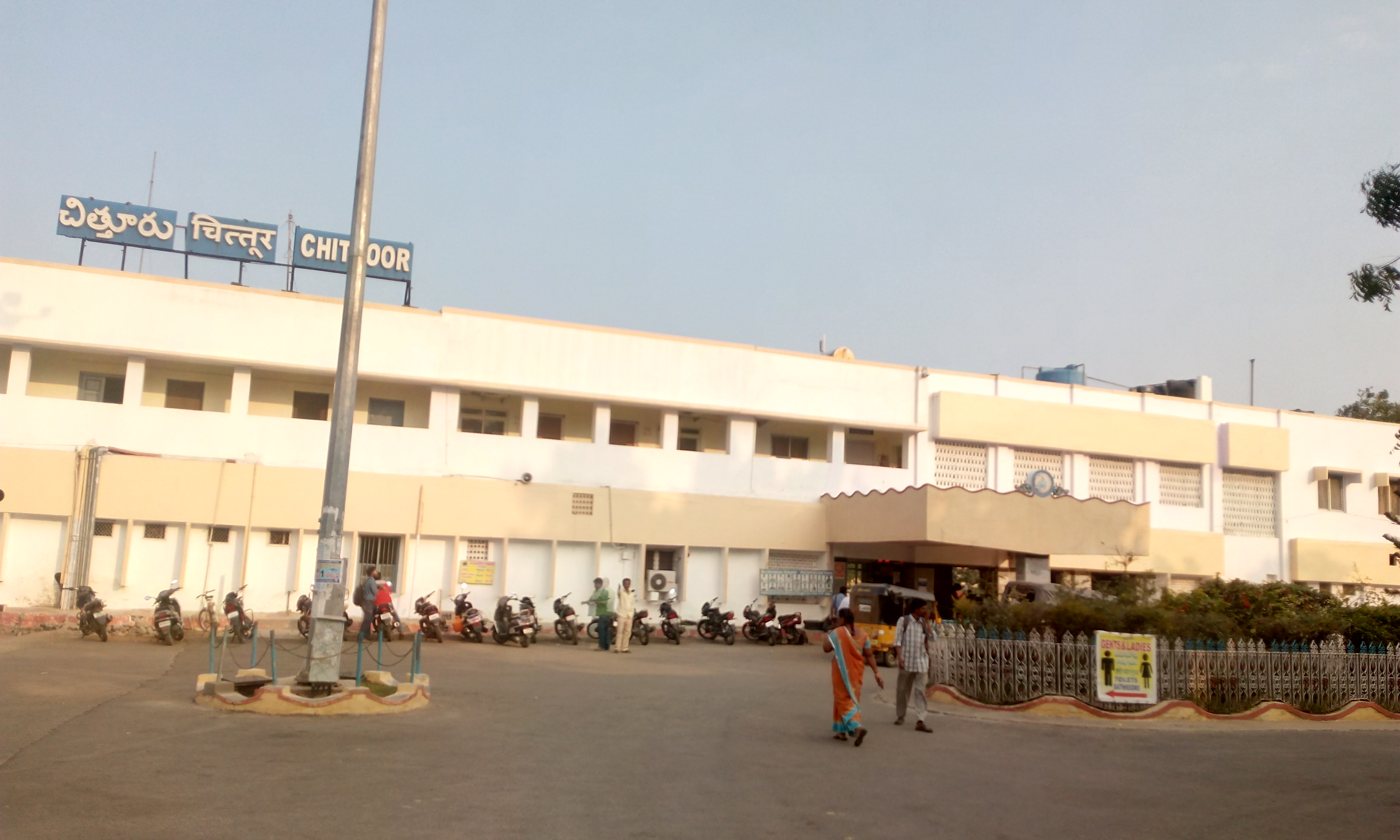
Chittor railway station entrance

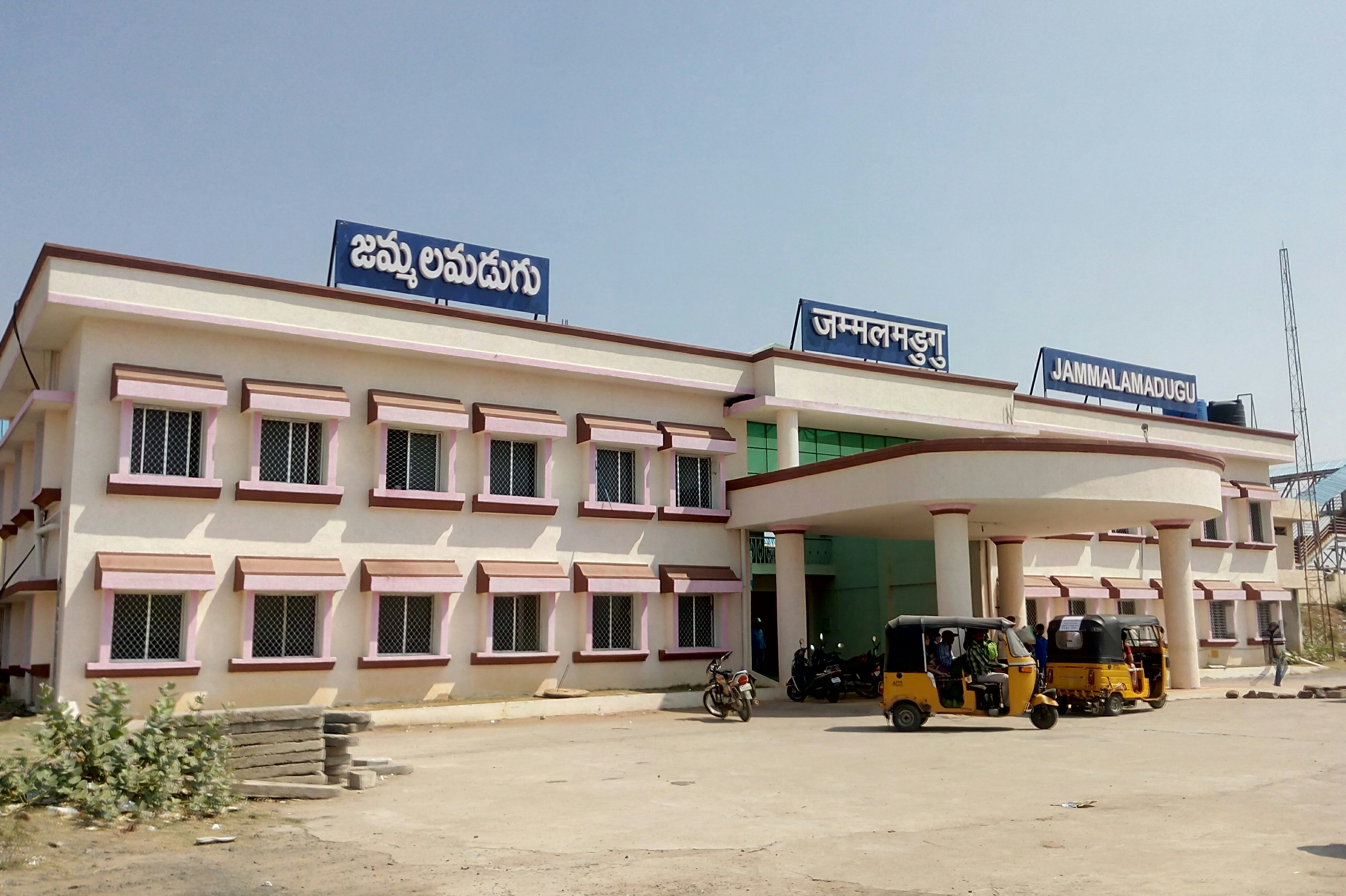
Jammalamadugu railway station located on newly opened Nandyal–Yerraguntla section

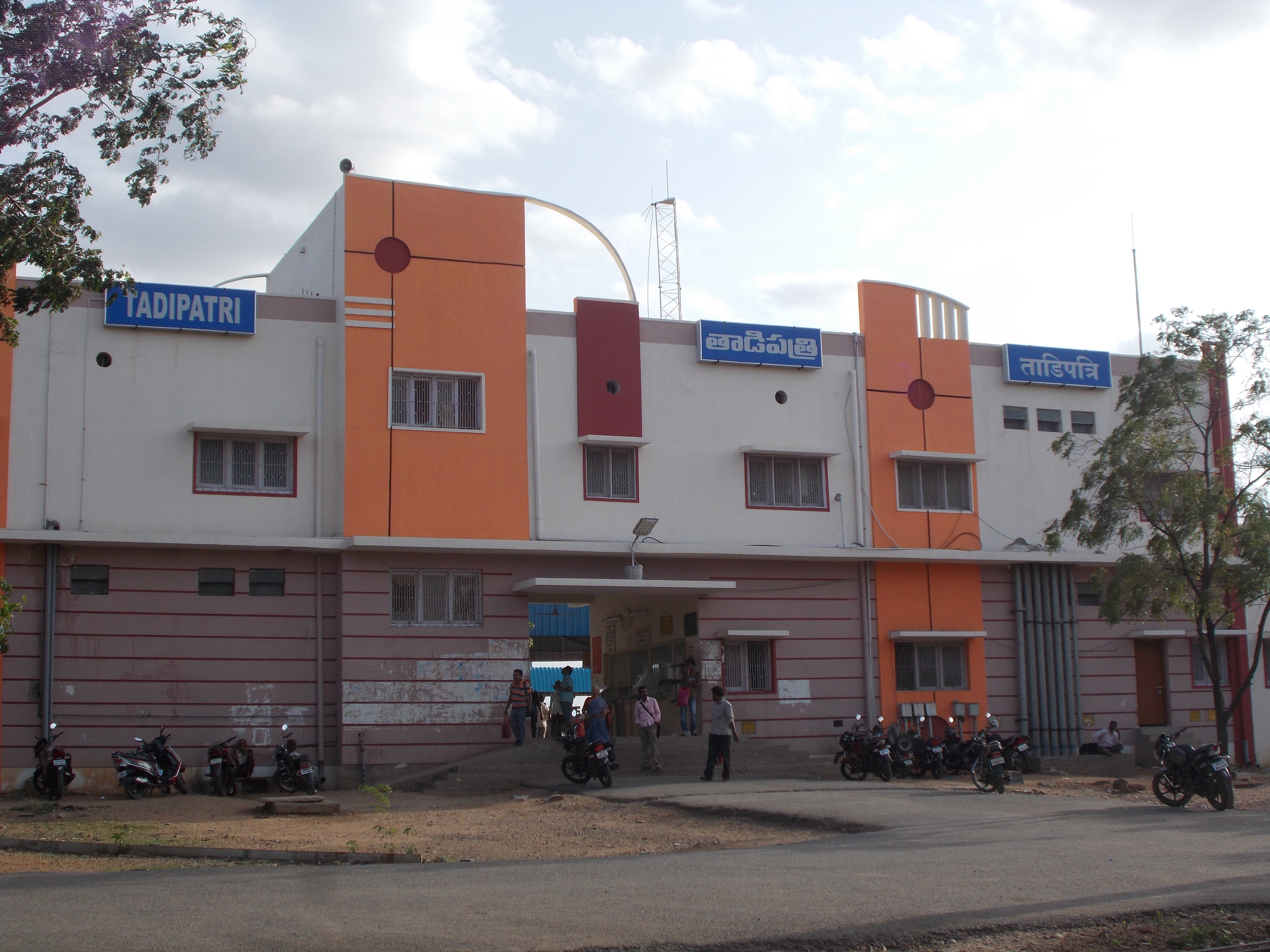
Tadipatri railway station entrance

The below table depicts the stations under the Guntakal division and their category.

Category of station	No. of stations	Names of stations
A-1	1	Tirupati
A	4	Anantapur, Guntakal Junction, Cuddapah Junction, Renigunta Junction,
B	8	Adoni, Chittoor, Dharmavaram Junction, Gooty Junction, Dhone Junction, Mantralayam, Pakala Junction, Srikalahasti
D	11	Pileru, Proddatur, Kadiri, Railway Koduru, Krishna, Nalwar, Narayanapet Road, Rajampeta, Tadipatri, Venkatagiri, Yerraguntla Junction
E	90	-
F	20	halt stations
Total	134	-

== Performance and earnings ==
Guntakal division generates revenue mainly from tourism and freight. There are many religious destinations as well natural tourism spots which draws tourists from various places. The freight revenue is due to the availability of large number natural resources, industries based on these resources and nearby ports.

== See also ==
- Divisions of Indian Railways
