= Guntakal–Nandyal section =

Railway line in India

Overview
- Status: Operational
- Owner: Indian Railways
- Locale: Andhra Pradesh
- Termini: Guntakal; Nandyal

Service
- Operator: South Coast Railway

Technical
- Line length: 144.30 km (89.66 mi)
- Track gauge: 5 ft 6 in (1,676 mm) broad gauge
Route map
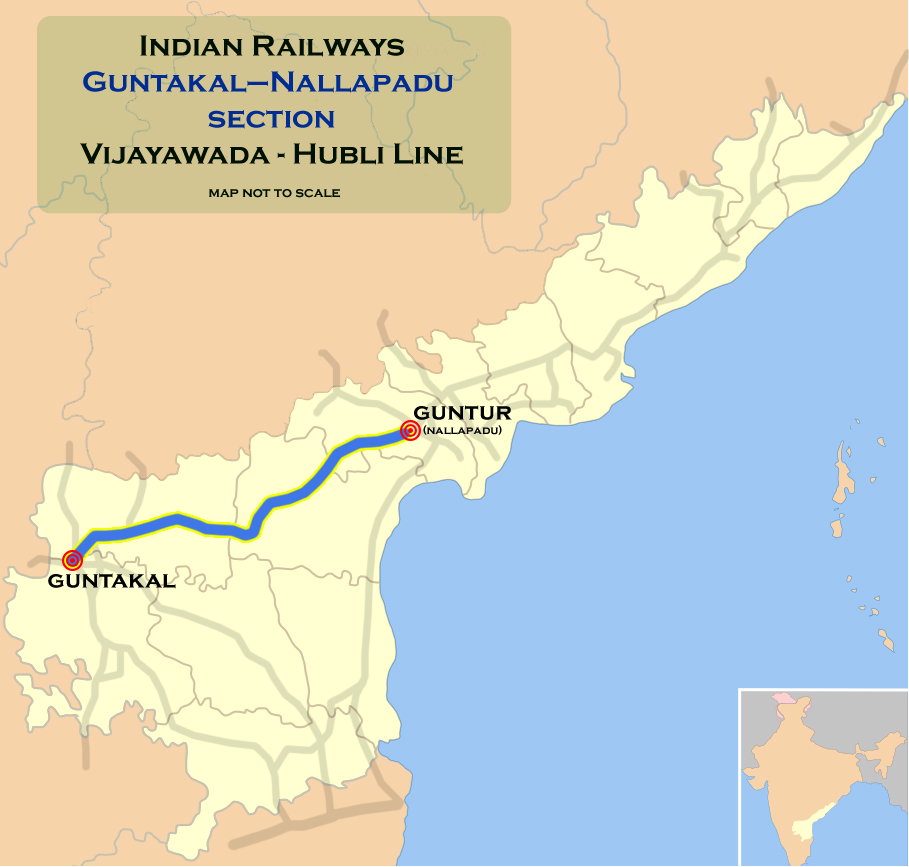

Guntakal–Nandyal section connects Guntakal and Nandyal in the Indian state of Andhra Pradesh. It is administered under Guntakal railway division of South Coast Railway zone, except the Nandyal railway station which is under Guntur railway division. It has a total route length of 144.30 km (89.66 mi).
