= Rudravaram =

Rudravaram may refer to:

- Rudravaram, Guntur, a village in Guntur district, Andhra Pradesh
- Rudravaram, Nandyal district, a village in Rudravaran mandal, Nandyal district, Andhra Pradesh
- Rudravaram, Prakasam, a village in Prakasam district, Andhra Pradesh
- Rudravaram, Machilipatnam mandal, a village in Machilipatnam mandal, Krishna district, Andhra Pradesh
- Sanarudravaram, a village in Kalidindi mandal of Krishna district, Andhra Pradesh
