= Cornwallis in India =

British Army officer in India

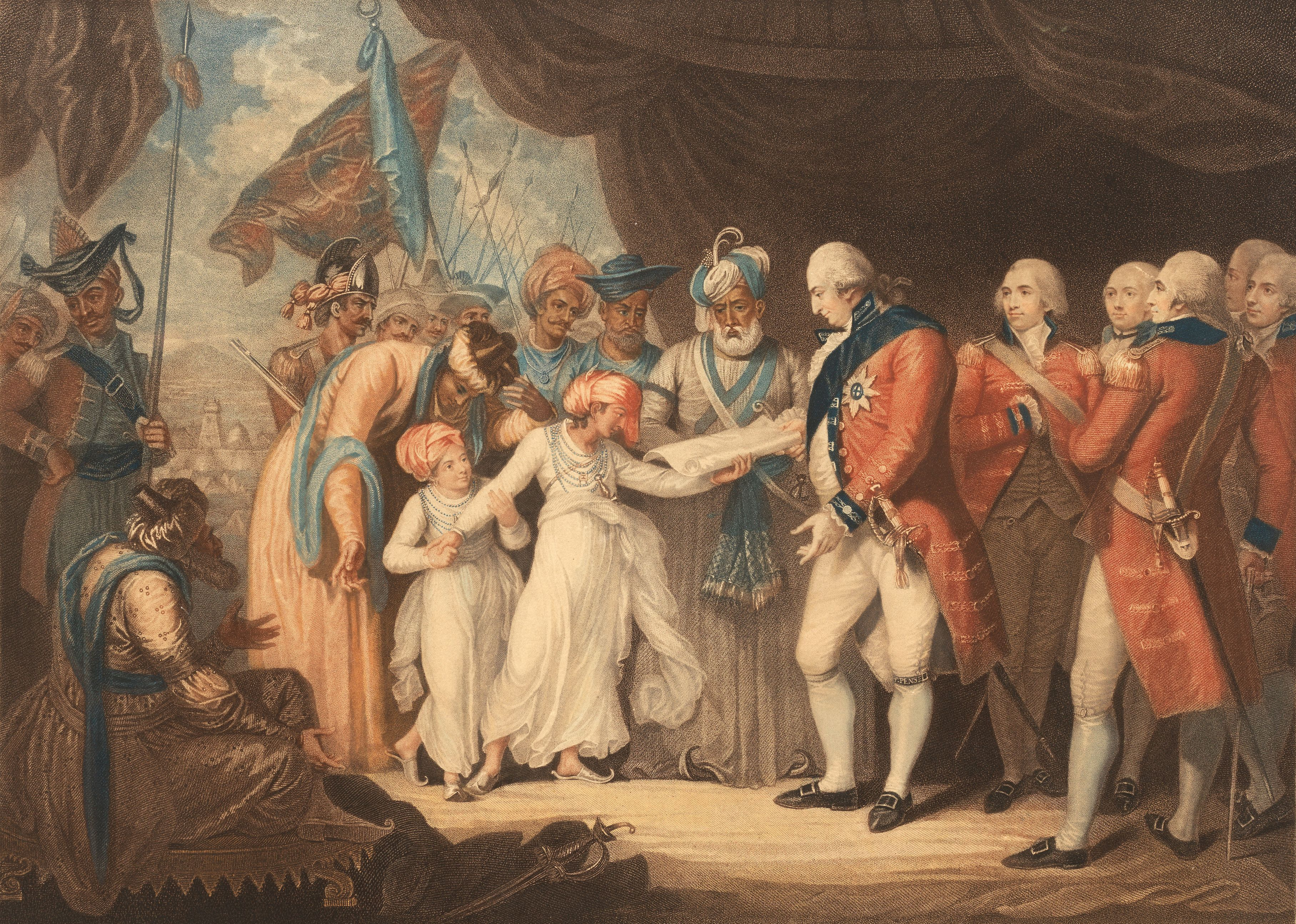
Cornwallis receiving Tipu Sultan's sons as hostages on 26 February 1792 during the Third Anglo-Mysore War

British General Charles Cornwallis, the Earl Cornwallis, was appointed in February 1786 to serve as both Commander-in-Chief of British India and Governor of the Presidency of Fort William, also known as the Bengal Presidency. He oversaw the consolidation of British control over much of peninsular India, setting the stage for the British Raj. He was also instrumental in enacting administrative and legal reforms that fundamentally altered civil administration and land management practices there. According to historian Jerry Dupont, Cornwallis was responsible for "laying the foundation for British rule throughout India and setting standards for the services, courts, and revenue collection that remained remarkably unaltered almost to the end of the British era."

He was raised to the title of Marquess Cornwallis in 1792 as recognition for his performance in the Third Anglo-Mysore War, in which he extracted significant concessions from the Mysorean ruler, Tipu Sultan. Returned to England in 1793, he was engaged in administrative and diplomatic postings until 1798, when he was posted to the Kingdom of Ireland as Lord Lieutenant and Commander-in-Chief. In 1801, he was again posted to India. He arrived in July 1805 and died in October in Ghazipur.

== Background ==
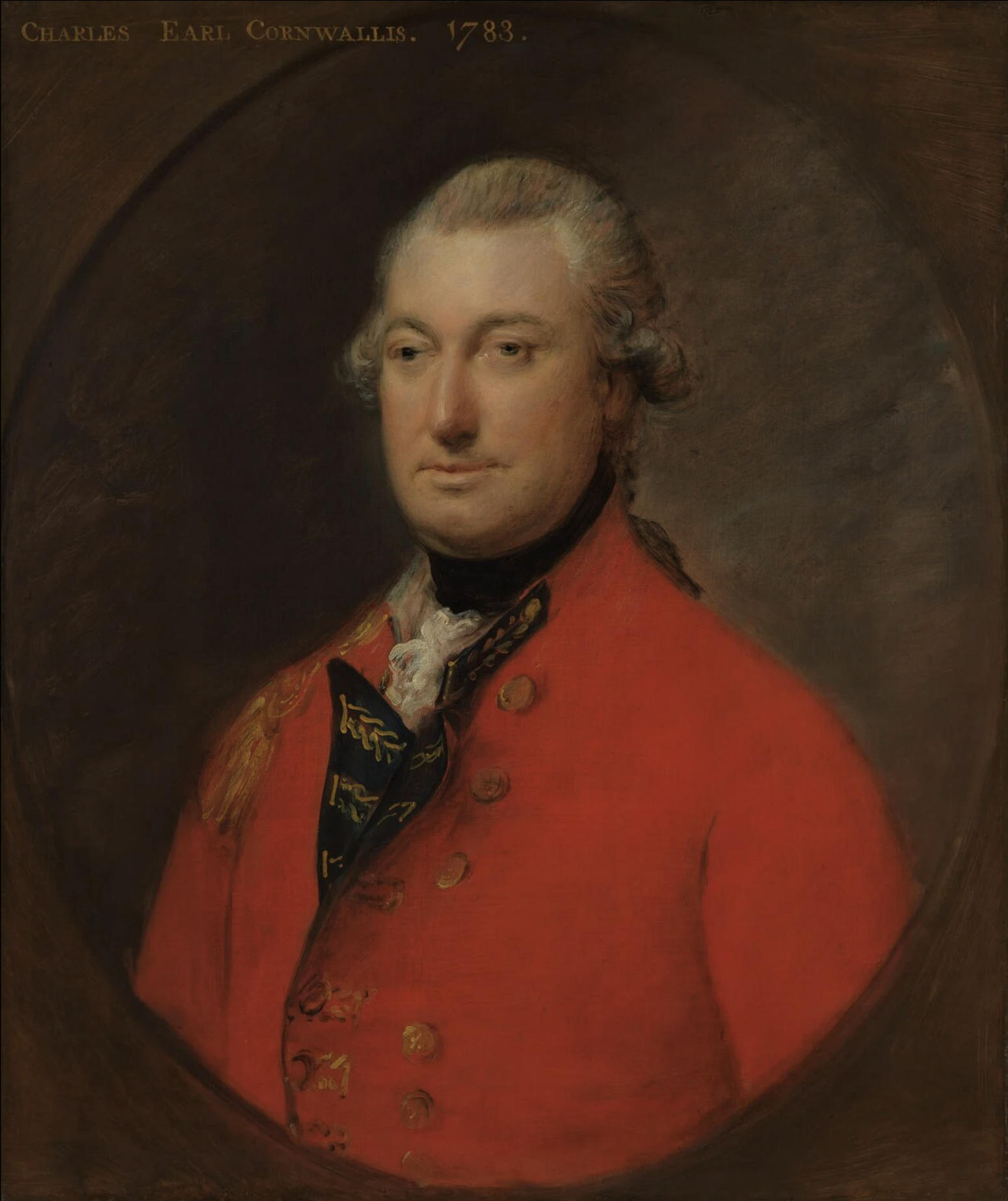
Portrait of Lord Cornwallis by Thomas Gainsborough, 1783

Lord Cornwallis was a British army officer, civil administrator, and diplomat. His career was primarily military in nature, including a series of well-known campaigns during the War of American Independence from 1776 to 1781 that culminated in his surrender at Yorktown. Following his return to England in 1782 he was prevented by his parole from further participation in the war, and financial demands eventually caused him to seek a position of greater pay than the half-pay that military officers received when not in service.

=== India in the range of 1780s ===
The area encompassed by modern-day India was significantly fractured following the decline of the Mughal Empire in the first half of the 18th century. Trading outposts, known as factories, were established by various European nations including Denmark–Norway, Portugal, France, and the Dutch Republic. These dotted both the Coromandel (east) and Malabar (west) coasts of the subcontinent, although many of these had been established with the formal permission of a local ruler (which was sometimes secured by force of arms). The Kingdom of Travancore dominated the southern tip, the Kingdom of Mysore held sway over the centre of the peninsula, and the Maratha Empire, a confederation of loosely allied principalities, dominated the northern reaches from Calcutta to Bombay. Although there were significant British presences at Bombay and Madras, each governed by a separate presidency, the Bengal region, including Calcutta, had come under the direct rule of the British East India Company in 1757, with authority to levy taxes, and its presidency dominated the others. Its civil head, the Governor-General of Fort William, ranked ahead of those of Madras and Bombay. Cornwallis quickly established himself as a transformational leader.

British colonial administration was dominated in the 1760s and 1770s by Warren Hastings, the first man to hold the title of Governor-General. The military arm of the East India Company was directed during the Seven Years' War and the Second Anglo-Mysore War by General Eyre Coote, who died in 1783 during the later stages of the war with Mysore. Company policy, as implemented by Hastings, had involved the company in intrigues and shifting alliances involving France, Mysore, the Marathas, and factions within those and other local territories.

== Appointment ==
Cornwallis was first considered for a posting to India during the ministry of the Earl of Shelburne in the spring of 1782. Shelburne asked Cornwallis if he wanted to go to India as governor general, an idea Cornwallis viewed with favour, as it provided employment without risking his parole status. However, Shelburne was a weak leader, and was turned out of power in early 1783, replaced by a coalition government dominated by men Cornwallis (and King George) disliked, Charles James Fox and Lord North. Cornwallis, who normally avoided politics (in spite of holding a seat in the House of Lords), became more vocal in opposition to the Fox-North ministry, hoping his support would be repaid by the next government.

"Much against my will, and with grief of heart, I have been obliged to say yes, and to exchange a life of ease and content, to encounter all the plagues and miseries of command an public station."

With the ascendancy of William Pitt the Younger to power in December 1783, doors to new positions were opened to the earl. Pitt first offered him the Lord Lieutenancy of Ireland, which he politely refused. He also made it clear that, were he posted to India, he would want the supreme military command in addition to civil control. When informed that Pitt was agreeable to this demand, he went through a period of soul-searching, torn between the conflicting demands of family and country. This, however, was not the only troubling issue. When Parliament took up consideration of assignments in India in August 1784, it was only prepared to offer one of the two posts, which he again refused to consider. Passed over for other military postings, Pitt placated him with the post of Constable of the Tower.

After refusing another inadequate entreaty from Pitt to take a post in India in February 1785, Cornwallis's demand for both posts were finally met a year later, on 23 February 1786. Departing London in May, he arrived at Madras on 22 August 1786, after "a most prosperous and expeditious passage", and at Calcutta on 12 September. Although he was accorded a welcome suitable to his rank, the acting governor-general, John Macpherson, was unhappy at being replaced. He attempted to reserve for his own use the Government House, which was normally reserved for the governor-general. Cornwallis, after having his oaths of office administered, immediately announced his intention to occupy the residence.

== Administrative reforms ==
Cornwallis was charged by the directors of the British East India Company to overhaul and reform its administration in India. The company had historically paid its functionaries (revenue collectors, traders, and administrators) in India relatively little, but allowed them to engage in trade for themselves, including the use of company shipping for the purpose. As long as the company was profitable, this open door to corruption and graft at the company's expense was overlooked. However, the rise of manufacturing in Britain led to a collapse of prices for textiles and other goods from India, and the company's involvement in wars on the subcontinent had also been expensive. By the time Cornwallis arrived the company was losing money. Its employees, however, continued to profit personally, without caring whether or not the company made money. Cornwallis sought to change this practice, first by refusing to engage in such dealing himself, and second, by securing pay increases for the company's functionaries while denying them their personal trading privileges.

Another area of reform that Cornwallis implemented was the reduction of nepotism and political favouritism as means for advancement and positions within the company. Seeking instead to advance the company's interests, he sought out and promoted individuals on the basis of merit, even refusing requests by the Prince of Wales to assist individuals in the latter's good graces.

== Judicial reforms ==
Prior to the earl's arrival, judicial and police powers in territories controlled by the company were a confusion of differing standards that were also either inconsistently or arbitrarily applied. Part of Cornwallis's work was the introduction of criminal and judicial regulations that to a significant degree still underpin the Indian judicial system. Indian cities, much like British cities of the time, were poorly policed, and crime was widespread. Different penal and civil codes were applied to Hindus and Muslims, and the codification of these codes in different languages meant that it was virtually impossible for justice to be properly and consistently applied. Much of the criminal justice system in Bengal remained in the hands of the nawab, the nominal local ruler of the company's territory. Furthermore, individuals with powerful political connections in their community often were able to act with impunity, since no one suffering at their hands was likely to press charges for fear of retribution. Hastings had several times made changes to policing and the administration of justice, but none of these had had a significant impact on the problem.

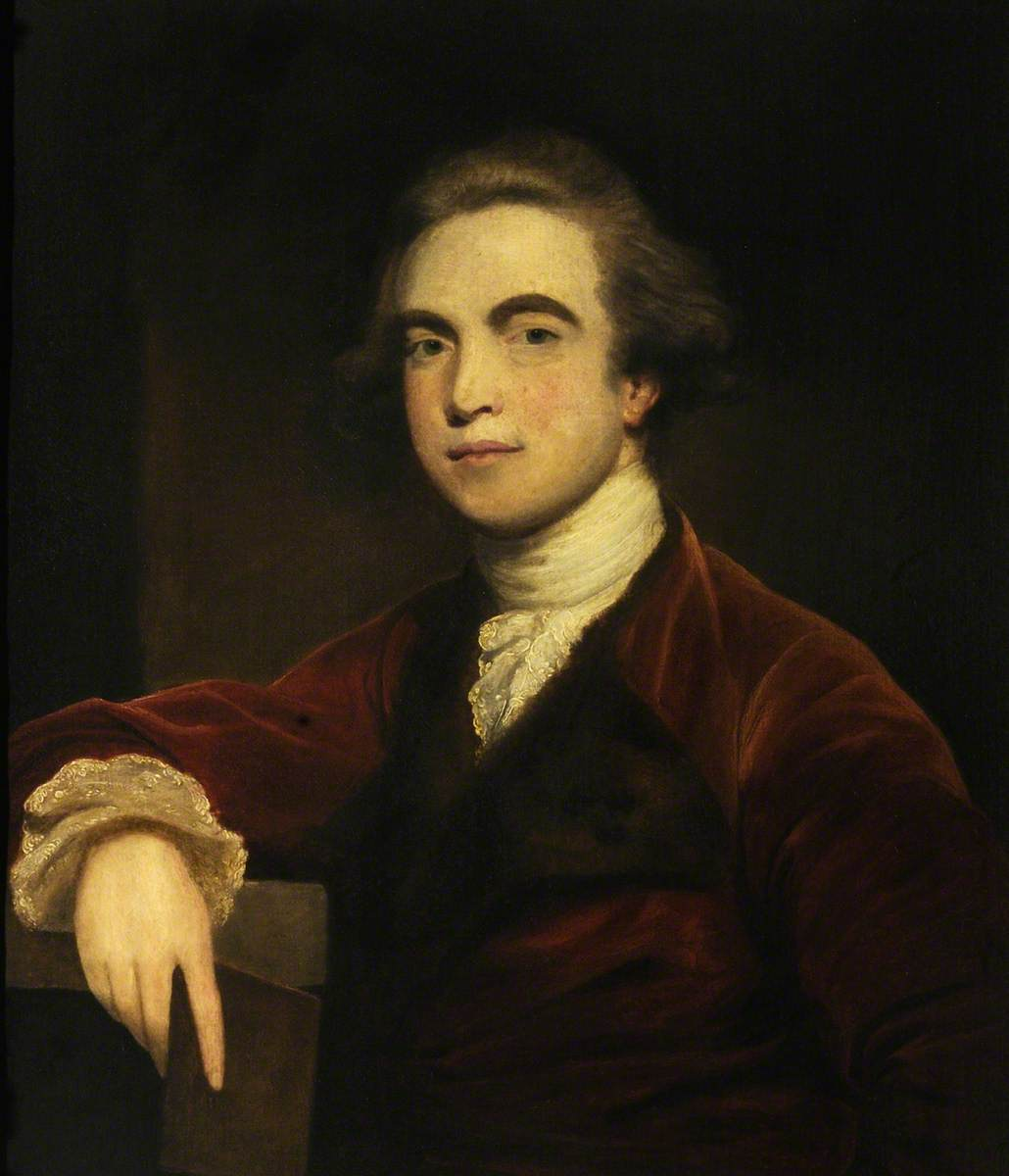
William Jones, who assisted Cornwallis by translating Indian penal codes

Cornwallis received critical assistance from others in his effort to introduce legal reforms. William Jones, an expert on languages, translated existing Hindu and Muslim penal codes into English so that they could be evaluated and applied by English-speaking judges. Cornwallis began in 1787 by giving limited criminal judicial powers to the company's revenue collectors, who already also served as civil magistrates. He also required them to report regularly on detention times and sentences given. In 1790 the company took over the administration of justice from the nawab, and Cornwallis introduced a system of circuit courts with a superior court that met in Calcutta and had the power of review over circuit court decisions. Judges were drawn from the company's European employees. These reforms also included changes to the penal codes to begin harmonising the different codes then in use. By the time of his departure in 1793 his work on the penal code, known in India as the Cornwallis Code, was substantially complete.

One consequence of the Cornwallis Code was that it, in effect, institutionalised racism in the legal system. Cornwallis, in a manner not uncommon at the time, believed that well-bred gentlemen of European extraction were superior to others, including those that were the product of mixed relationships in India. Of the latter, he wrote "as on account of their colour & extraction they are considered in this country as inferior to Europeans, I am of opinion that those of them who possess the best abilities could not command that authority and respect which is necessary in the due discharge of the duty of an officer." In 1791 he issued an order that "No person, the son of a Native Indian, shall henceforward be appointed by this Court to Employment in the Civil, Military, or Marine Service of the Company." Cornwallis's biographers, the Wickwires, also observe that this institutionalisation of the British as an elite class simply added another layer on top of the complex status hierarchy of caste and religion that existed in India at the time. Cornwallis could not have formalised these policies without the (tacit or explicit) agreement of the company's directors and employees.

Cornwallis's attitude toward the lower classes did, however, include a benevolent and somewhat paternalistic desire to improve their condition. He introduced legislation to protect native weavers who were sometimes forced into working at starvation wages by unscrupulous company employees, outlawed child slavery, and established in 1791 a Sanskrit college for Hindus that is now the Government Sanskrit College in Benares. He also established a mint in Calcutta that, in addition to benefiting the poor by providing a reliable standard currency, was a forerunner to India's modern currency.

== The Permanent Settlement ==
The company's acquisition of the territories of Bengal in the 1760s led to its decisions to collect taxes in the area as a means of reducing investment capital directed toward India. A variety of taxation schemes were implemented in the following years, none of which produced satisfactory results, and many of which left too much power over the natives in the hands of the tax collectors, or zamindars. The company's directors gave Cornwallis the task of coming up with a taxation scheme that would meet the company's objectives without being an undue burden on the working men of its territories.

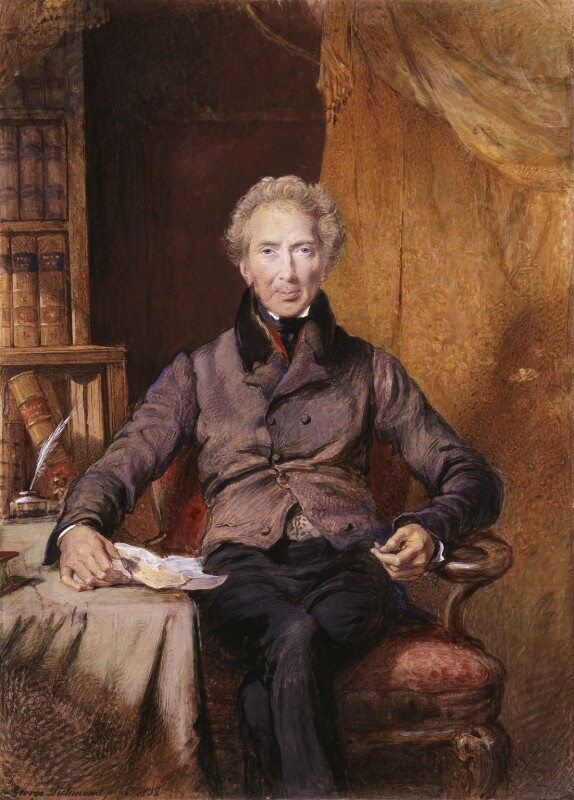
John Shore, portrait by George Richmond

John Shore (who went on to succeed Cornwallis as Governor-General) and Charles Grant, two men he came to trust implicitly, were the most important contributors to what is now called the Permanent Settlement. The essence of the arrangement they came up with in the summer of 1789 was that the zamindars would effectively become hereditary landholders, paying the company tax based on the value of the land. Shore and Cornwallis disagreed on the term of the scheme, with Shore arguing for a ten-year time limit on the arrangement, while Cornwallis argued for a truly permanent scheme. Cornwallis prevailed, noting that many of the company's English revenue collectors, as well as others knowledgeable of company finance and taxation, supported permanency. In 1790 the proposal was sent to London, where the company directors approved the plan in 1792. Cornwallis began implementing the regulations in 1793.

Critics of the Permanent Settlement objected to its permanency, claimed that the company was forgoing revenue, and that Cornwallis and others advocating it misunderstood the historic nature of the zamindars. The Wickwires note that Cornwallis relied extensively on advice not only from John Shore, who had extensive experience in India prior to Cornwallis's arrival, but also from the revenue collectors in the various districts, who were almost uniformly in favour of a permanent settlement with the zamindars. He was also clear on the need to protect the ryots (land tenants) from the excesses of the zamindars, writing, "It is immaterial to government what individual possessed the land, provided he cultivates it, protects the ryots, and pays the public revenue."

== Penang and Nepal ==
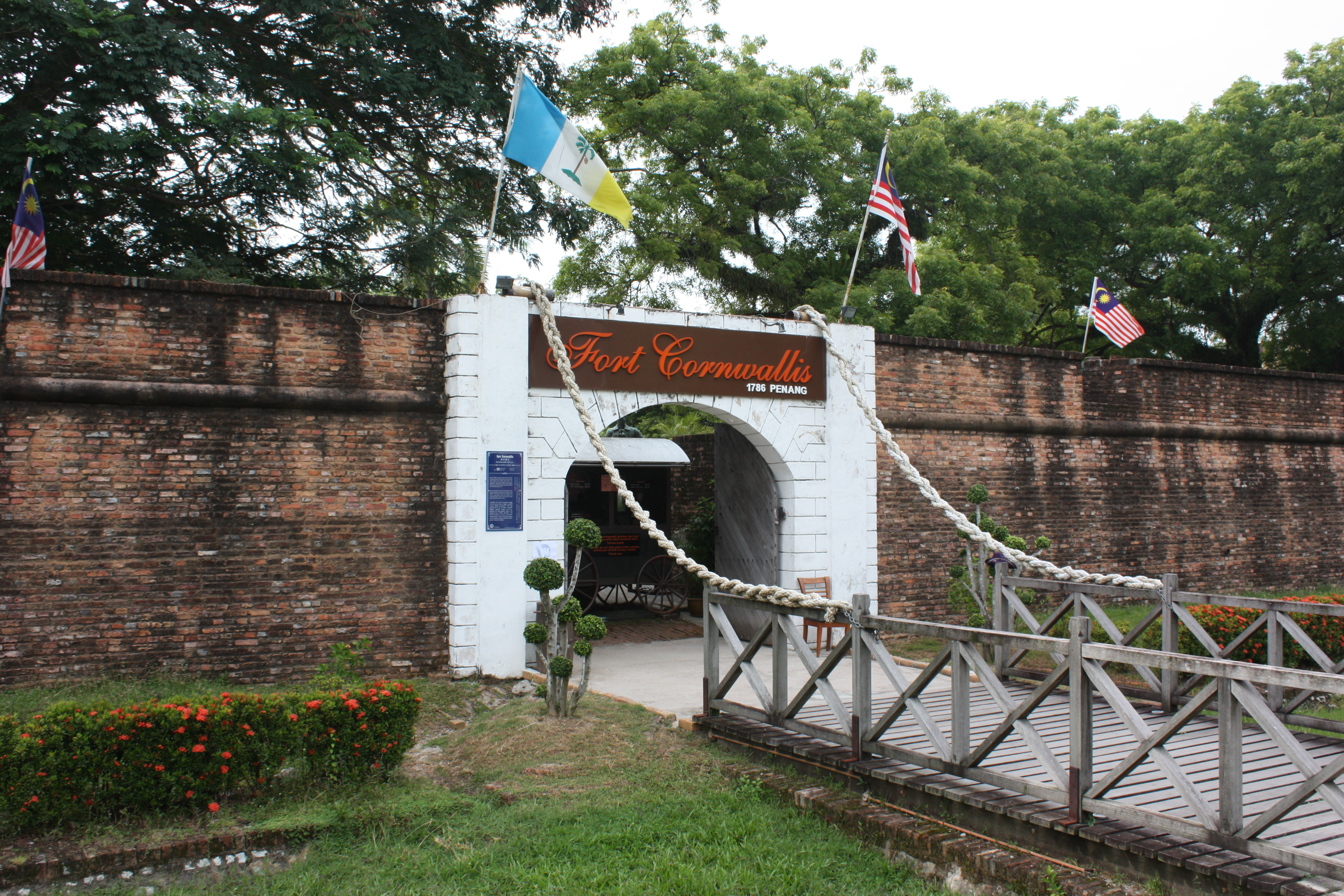
Fort Cornwallis, Penang

Cornwallis's predecessor, John Macpherson, had authorised negotiations with the sultan of Kedah for the establishment of a company trading post on the island of Penang. Captain Francis Light, a trader familiar with the East Indies, negotiated an agreement in which the sultan, who was surrounded by powerful adversaries, received a share of the trade profits and a defensive military alliance in exchange for Penang. Captain Light made representations to the sultan that the company had agreed to these terms, and occupied the island in August 1786. Cornwallis, concerned that the military aspects of the agreement might draw the company into conflicts with the sultan's adversaries or the Dutch, withheld approval of the agreement and requested the company's directors to decide the issue. When the company refused the military alliance, the sultan began blockading the island, renamed Prince of Wales Island by Light, and started in 1790 to accumulate troops with the view toward forcibly evicting the British. Cornwallis's brother William, then with the Royal Navy in the area, sailed from Penang to pick up troops in India for its defence. Captain Light, however, routed the sultan's forces in April 1791 before those reinforcements arrived. An agreement was then signed in which the company paid the sultan an annual stipend for the use of Penang. The fort that Captain Light constructed to protect Penang's principal town, George Town, became known as Fort Cornwallis in the earl's honour.

In 1792, King Rana Bahadur Shah of Nepal, with whom the company had established trade relations, requested military assistance. Shah had been expanding his territory militarily by taking over smaller adjacent principalities, but a 1791 invasion of Tibet was met with a stiff Chinese response. Cornwallis declined the king's request, sending instead Colonel William Kirkpatrick to mediate the dispute. Kirkpatrick was the first Englishman to see Nepal; by the time he reached Kathmandu in 1793, the parties had already resolved their dispute.

== War with Mysore ==
Immediately after the signing of the Treaty of Mangalore in 1784, ending the Second Anglo-Mysore War, Tipu Sultan, the ruler of the Kingdom of Mysore, restated his hatred for the British, declaring that he would seek to renew conflict with them. Cornwallis, upon his arrival in India, took steps to modify or abrogate agreements with the Maratha Empire and with the Nizam of Hyderabad (both of whom had territories on Mysore's northern border) that he saw as problematic with respect to the provisions of the 1784 treaty. He did assure them that if France became involved in conflict against their territories that the company would assist them. Pursuant to this policy, he refused to send company troops to assist the Marathas and the Nizam in their war with Mysore to recover previously lost territories.

=== Early campaigns ===
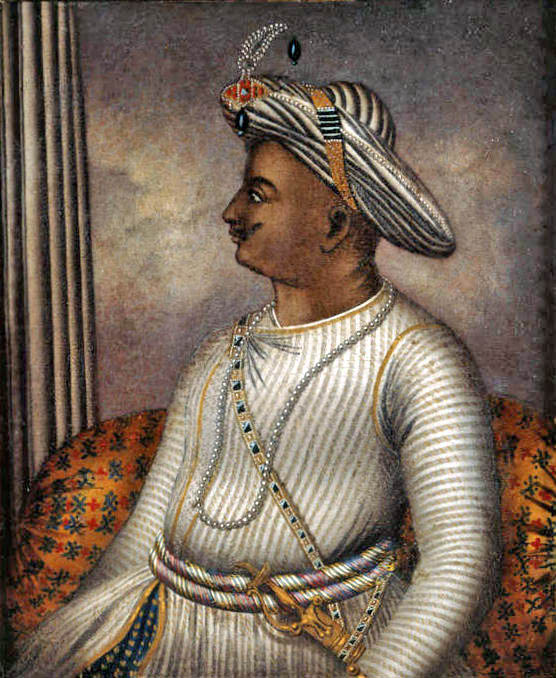
Tipu Sultan

Tensions between Tipu and the Nizam and the British were raised when, in 1788, the East India Company gained control over the Circar of Guntur, the southernmost of the Northern Circars, pursuant to an earlier agreement with the Nizam. In exchange, the company agreed to station some of its troops with the Hyderabadi army. By 1789, tensions between Tipu and his neighbours and vassals to Mysore's west, including the Kingdom of Travancore, also rose noticeably. Travancore, listed in the 1784 treaty as a British ally, acquired from the Dutch East India Company two forts located within the territory of Cochin, a Mysorean vassal state. The Dutch had never paid tribute to anyone for these forts since gaining control of them, but the fact that they were within Cochin's bounds was sufficient for Tipu to dispute Travancore's claim. He began massing troops at Coimbatore and making threatening gestures toward Dharma Raja of Travancore. British authorities in Madras warned Tipu that acts of aggression against Travancore would be met with a British response, and Cornwallis began urging John Holland, the governor of Madras, to begin military preparations. On 29 December 1789, Tipu attacked Travancore's defences. Hollond, however, was not a military man, and rather than acting with vigour, he temporised and attempted negotiation with Tipu. He was replaced in early 1790 by General William Medows, to whom Cornwallis gave the authority for a military campaign against Mysore. Cornwallis began negotiating with the Marathas and the Nizam for their support, since the British forces in India were significantly lacking in cavalry, one of Tipu's strengths. The Marathas and the Nizam both had significant cavalry forces, and they were interested in recovering territories lost to Mysore in earlier conflicts. However, they were too weak to attack Mysore individually, and did not trust each other, so they preferred to wait until it was clear the British were committed to act against Mysore.

Medows' campaign in 1790 was a limited success. He occupied the Coimbatore district against minimal opposition, but a forceful counterattack by Tipu reduced the British holdings to Coimbatore itself and a few other outposts. Tipu had also descended to the coastal plain, where he plowed through the Carnatic and even met with the French at Pondicherry in a fruitless attempt to draw them into the conflict. By September 1790 the British allies were taking the field, but still did not want to face Tipu's strong force without significant British support. Consequently, Cornwallis decided to personally take control of the main British force from Medows. In early February 1791 he began a campaign that was squarely targeted at Mysore's capital, Seringapatam.

=== First campaign against Seringapatam ===
One of the largest issues confronting Cornwallis in managing the army was its diversity. In addition to British Army and East India Company European forces, there were German troops from Hanover, and a large number of native sepoys from a diversity of cultural backgrounds, speaking different languages and having varied religious and dietary requirements. To meet the needs of this patchwork of forces, the army was followed by a number of camp followers that was unusually large by comparison to typical European or North American armies, further increasing the need for reliable supply. The army he took over from General Medows had 15,000 troops and 60,000 camp followers. He permitted the artist Robert Home to accompany the army on its campaign; the resulting artwork is one of the legacies of the campaign.

Cornwallis was sensitive to the fact that Tipu was likely to deny the invading army access to local forage and provisions, so he made arrangements for a large supply of provisions and arranged for the use of elephants to assist in the movement of the army's siege equipment. He also encouraged the Marathas and the Nizam to step up their advances to join his army as quickly as possible so that he could take advantage of their cavalry.

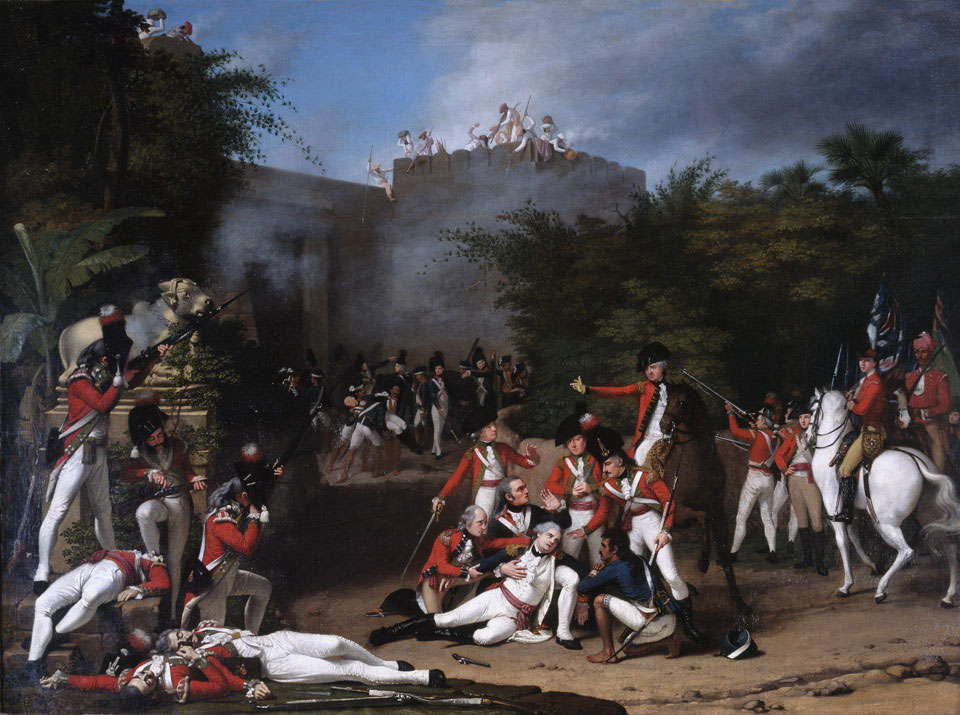
The Death of Colonel Moorhouse at the Storming of the Pettah Gate of Bangalore, by Robert Home, 1793

Cornwallis departed Velhout, near Madras, on 5 February, reaching Vellore on 11 February. After several days of rest, the army set out with the apparent intention of crossing the Eastern Ghats directly west of Vellore. However, this was a feint, and Cornwallis turned the army north and instead crossed the mountains at Muglee. Tipu, who had taken steps to defend the more southerly passes, had not defended this one, and the army met no resistance. In fact, it met no significant resistance until it neared Bangalore, one of the strongest fortresses in eastern Mysore. On 5 March, Colonel John Floyd, leader of the British cavalry, was lured into a trap set by Tipu that cost the army 70 men and 250 valuable horses. Cornwallis brushed off the loss and proceeded to besiege Bangalore. On 7 March the city's walls were breached, and the city was stormed through the opening, sending its defenders scurrying. Cornwallis gained control of the whole city except its fortress, which was stormed on the night of 21 March after its walls were breached. Tipu, from his camps outside the city, offered only weak resistance, ineffectually attempting to impede the siegeworks and assist the besieged fortress during the final assault.

After securing Bangalore, Cornwallis began to move against Tipu, who retreated toward Seringapatam. The lack of cavalry, however, hampered the British effort, so Cornwallis ordered the army north to make junction with the nizam's troops. When they finally met about 60 miles (97 km) from Bangalore, Cornwallis described Teige Wunt's cavalry as "extremely defective in almost every point of military discipline", and their presence in the army ultimately presented more difficulties than assistance. Instead of acting as flanking companies and foraging on their own, they preferred to remain with the main army and consume its provisions. This forced Cornwallis to alter the army's route again to join with a supply train carrying additional provisions. The army returned to Bangalore on 28 April and then set out for Seringapatam.

The march was significantly slowed by early monsoon rains that turned the march into a muddy mess. In spite of appeals by Cornwallis to Teige Wunt, the nizam's men continued to consume provisions, and the army's provisions began to run short. Tipu retreated before the army, employing scorched-earth tactics to deny his enemy provisions. Baggage was left behind as draft animals died, and the army, including its officers, were on half rations. The rains flooded the Kaveri River, which was difficult to cross even under favourable conditions, and which separated the army from a British force under Robert Abercromby that was waiting on the far side of Seringapatam for Cornwallis's arrival.

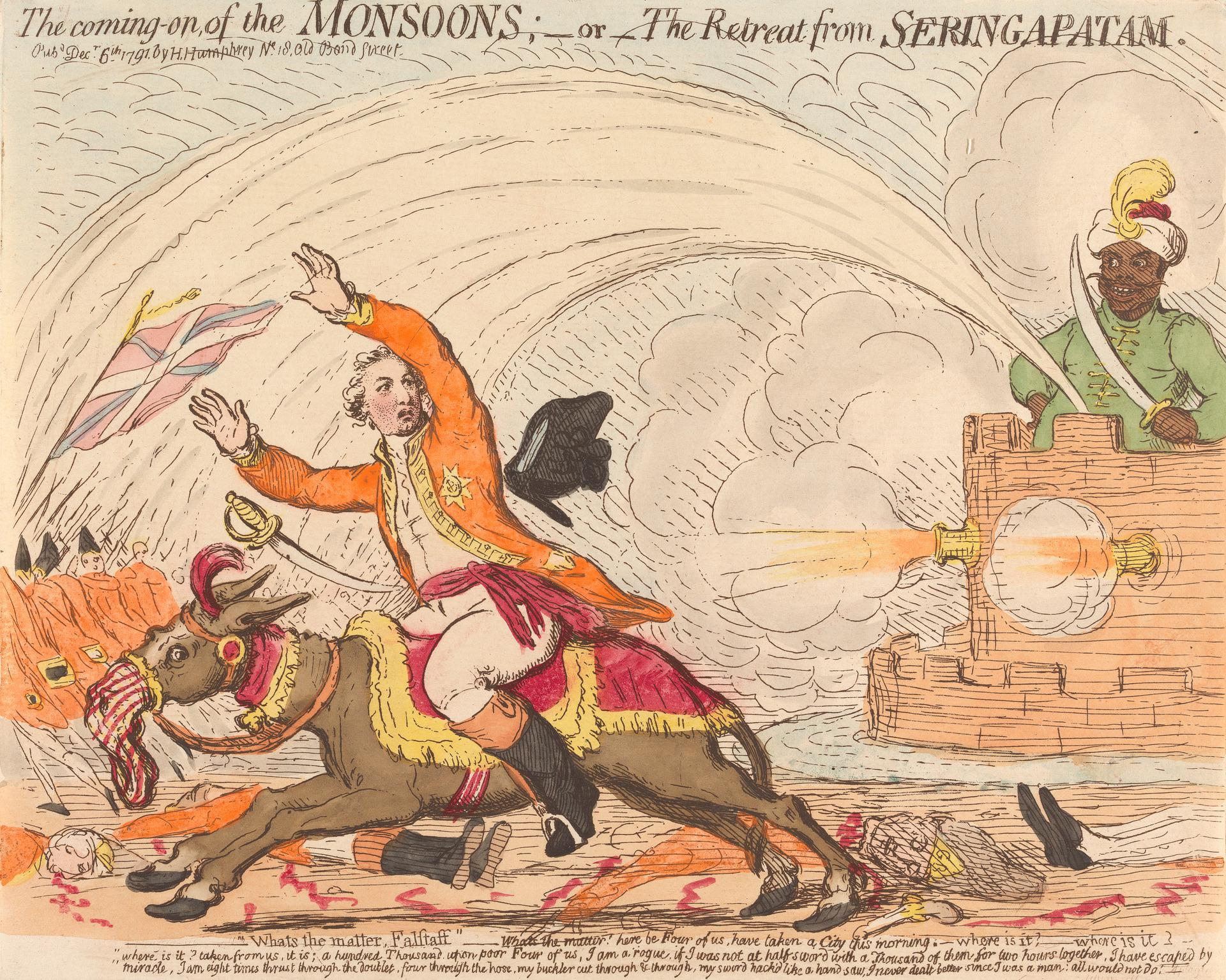
James Gillray cartoon mocking Cornwallis after his 1791 retreat from Seringapatam

On 13 May, near the village of Arakere, about 10 miles (16 km) below Seringapatam, Tipu decided to offer battle from a position on nearby heights. In the ensuing battle, complicated by the rains, Cornwallis prevailed, routing Tipu's forces, which retreated into Seringapatam. Following the battle, Cornwallis made the difficult decision to retreat, as the army's supply situation had become so desperate that a siege would have been impossible, even if he could have joined with Abercromby's troops. A hoped-for junction with Marathan troops also seemed unlikely, as Tipu had successfully prevented communication and intelligence of their position from reaching Cornwallis, and the most recent reports placed them some distance off. After ordering Abercromby to retreat on 21 May, Cornwallis ordered his siege train destroyed and began to retreat toward Bangalore on 26 May. That very day, he was met by an advance company of the Marathan army. The next day that army, totalling some 40,000 cavalry, joined with his. The Marathan army was well-provisioned, so they were able to relieve some of the British army's stresses, although the prices they charged for their provisions were exorbitant. The combined army reached Bangalore on 11 July. Tipu took advantage of the retreat to make a concerted attack on Coimbatore, which fell after a lengthy siege in November.

=== Second campaign against Seringapatam ===
The armies of Parshuram Bhau and Teige Wunt then left the grand army to pursue territorial gains in Mysore's northern territories. Whereas the earl's younger brother, Commodore William Cornwallis, was engaged in the naval Battle of Tellicherry, Cornwallis spent the remainder of 1791 securing his supply lines to Madras and clearing the way to Seringapatam. To this end he laid siege to Nundydroog in November and Savendroog in December, both of which fell after unexpectedly modest efforts. He also ordered a massive supply operation to ensure that adequate supplies and pay for his army and those of the allies would be available. Spies were sent to infiltrate Tipu's camps, and he began to receive more reliable reports of the latter's troop strengths and disposition.

The relations between Cornwallis and the allies were difficult. The Mahrattan military leaders, Parshuram Bhau and Hari Pant, had to be bribed to stay with the army, and Cornwallis reported the Hyderabadi forces to be more of a hindrance than a help; one British observer wrote that they were a "disorderly rabble" and "not very creditable to the state of military discipline at Hyderabad."

On 25 January, Cornwallis moved from Savendroog toward Seringapatam, while Abercromby again advanced from the Malabar coast. Although Tipu's men harassed the column, they did not impede its progress, and it reached the Mysorean capital on 5 February. Cornwallis established a chain of outposts to protect the supply line from Bangalore and planned an attack for that night, even though Abercromby had not yet arrived. Cornwallis responded with a night-time attack to dislodge Tipu from his lines. After a somewhat confused battle, Tipu's forces were flanked, he retreated into the city, and Cornwallis began siege operations. On 12 February Abercromby arrived with the Bombay army, and the noose began to tighten around Tipu. By 23 February, Tipu began making overtures for peace talks, and hostilities were suspended the next day when he agreed to preliminary terms.

Among the preliminary terms that Cornwallis insisted on was that Tipu surrender two of his sons as hostages as a guarantee for his execution of the agreed terms. On 26 February his two young sons were formally delivered to Cornwallis amid great ceremony and gun salutes by both sides. Cornwallis, who was not interested in significantly extending the company's territory or in turning most of Mysore over to the Mahrattas and Hyderabad, negotiated a division of one half of Mysorean territory, to be divided by the allies, in which the company's acquisition would improve its defences. He later wrote, "If we had taken Seringapatam and killed Tippoo, [...] we must either have given that capital to the Marattas (a dangerous boon) or have set up some miserable pageant of our own, to be supported by the Company's troops and treasures, and to be plundered by its servants." The territories taken deprived Mysore of much of its coastline; Mysore was also obligated to pay some of the allied war costs. On 18 March 1792 Tipu agreed to the terms and signed the Treaty of Seringapatam, ending hostilities.

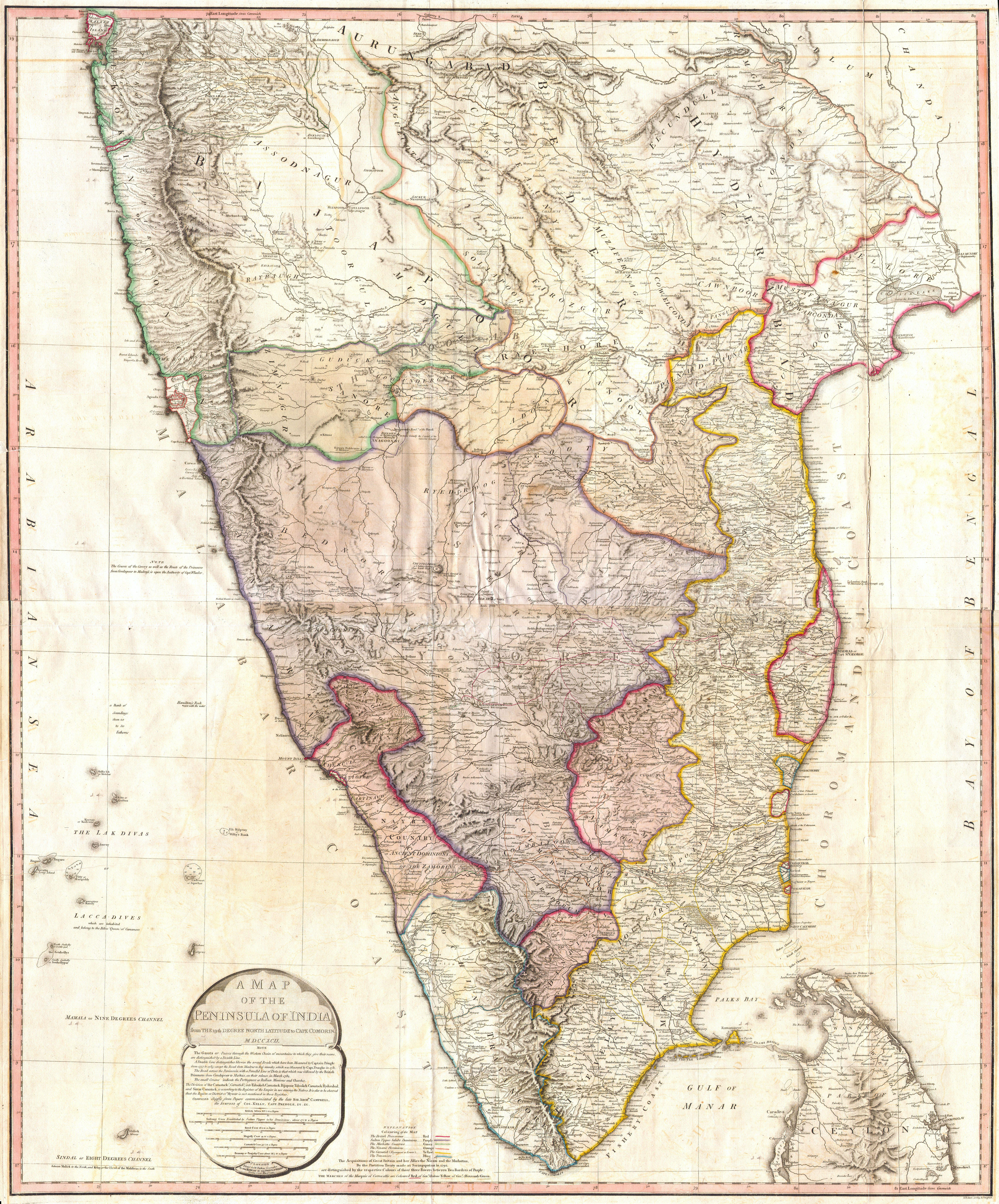
1794 Map showing "The Territories ceded by Tipu Sultan to the Different Powers"

== Departure ==
The difficulties of the military campaigns took a great physical toll on Cornwallis, and he sought to return to England. John Shore, his replacement, did not arrive until March 1793, and Cornwallis remained until August to assist in the transition. He also oversaw the capture of the French outpost at Pondicherry following the arrival of news that war had again broken out in Europe. On 14 August 1793, without ceremony, he quietly sailed from Calcutta for Madras, and on 10 October he finally sailed for England on board the Swallow.

== After India ==
Scholar P.J. Marshall explains that the British public were able to follow the Third Mysore War in newspapers "in much greater detail than would have been the case for any previous war in India." Thus, when Cornwallis returned victorious from India, he was celebrated well beyond parliamentary and company circles. He was raised to Marquess, but was also celebrated publicly through commissioned portraits and statues; published books, songs and poems; and even purchasable medallions and tea trays. This was the first time a military victory in India at the expense of a non-European enemy garnered such public praise. While there would be many more bumps along the way, such widespread enthusiasm marked a turning point towards British acceptance of an overseas empire of conquest.

Cornwallis was immediately asked to return to India. One reform that Cornwallis had been unable to achieve was the harmonisation of pay and rank between the military forces of the company and those of the Crown. Company officers of a given rank were generally paid better than those of a comparable rank in the Crown forces, and proposals to merge their pay scales were met with resistance that bordered on mutiny. The company directors asked Cornwallis to deal with this; he refused.

After serving for several years as the master of the ordnance, he was asked by Prime Minister William Pitt the Younger to serve as Lord Lieutenant of Ireland as well as its commander-in-chief after the Irish Rebellion of 1798 broke out. While the rebellion was mostly put down before his arrival, he oversaw the mopping up of the remaining pockets of rebellion and successfully defeated a French invasion intended to foment further rebellious activity. He then worked to secure the passage by the Irish Parliament of the 1800 Act of Union, which joined the Kingdom of Ireland and the Kingdom of Great Britain into the United Kingdom of Great Britain and Ireland. He resigned his posts when the king refused to support Catholic emancipation, which he viewed as a key element for securing an enduring peace in Ireland.

He was then engaged by the king in diplomatic efforts in Europe. Cornwallis led the British diplomatic team whose negotiations with Napoleon resulted in the 1802 Treaty of Amiens, with Cornwallis signing the treaty on behalf of King George.

== Return to India ==
In the years since he left India, the company's reach and control over the country had increased significantly, mainly under the governorship of Lord Mornington. Wellesley had decisively defeated Tipu in 1799 and gained control, direct and indirect, over most of southern India. In 1803 the company came into conflict with the Marathas, and Mornington began extending the company's reach further into the northern territories. His liberal spending and aggressive methods for dealing with the Marathas were not appreciated by the company's directors, and following military setbacks in 1804 and allegations of improprieties, the directors decided to replace him.

On 7 January 1805 Cornwallis was again appointed to the positions of Governor-General and Commander-in-Chief of India; after a difficult passage he reached Madras on 19 July, and on 30 July he resumed his duties. William Hickey wrote that Cornwallis had become "a wreck of what he had been when formerly in Bengal", and another aide noted that "his constitution was less equal to contend against the effects of this climate". In spite of declining health and mental faculties, Cornwallis began a trip by boat to visit army outposts northwest of Calcutta. On the journey he wrote to General Gerard Lake, then commanding the forces in the war with the Marathas, insisting that peace be made. However, he never received Lake's answer. When Cornwallis reached Ghazipur on 27 September, he was too ill to proceed further, and he died there a week later, on 5 October 1805. He was buried at Ghazipur.

== Legacy ==
This monument, erected by the British inhabitants of Calcutta, attests their sense of those virtues which will live in the remembrance of grateful millions, long after it shall have mouldered into dust.

— Inscription on Cornwallis mausoleum, Ghazipur

Biographers Franklin and Mary Wickwire note that Cornwallis's attitudes towards governance presaged the idea of responsible government that took hold in the United Kingdom in the 19th century. Later British administrators and the Indian Civil Service adopted his ideas of service by example and service for the overall benefit of the population. Historian Marguerite Wilbur called the era of Cornwallis and Mornington the Golden Age of British rule in India.

Cornwallis's grave at Ghazipur is marked by a mausoleum whose construction was begun in 1809. Memorials were also erected in his honour in Bombay, Madras, and in Saint Paul's Cathedral in London. In Calcutta, when Mornington greatly expanded the government facilities, the Town Hall included a statuary hall. In 1803, a sculpture begun by John Bacon and finished by his son John Bacon, Jr. was erected there in Cornwallis's honour. The sculpture now stands in the Victoria Memorial.
