= Cornwallis in Ireland =

British Army officer in the Kingdom of Ireland (from 1798 to 1801)

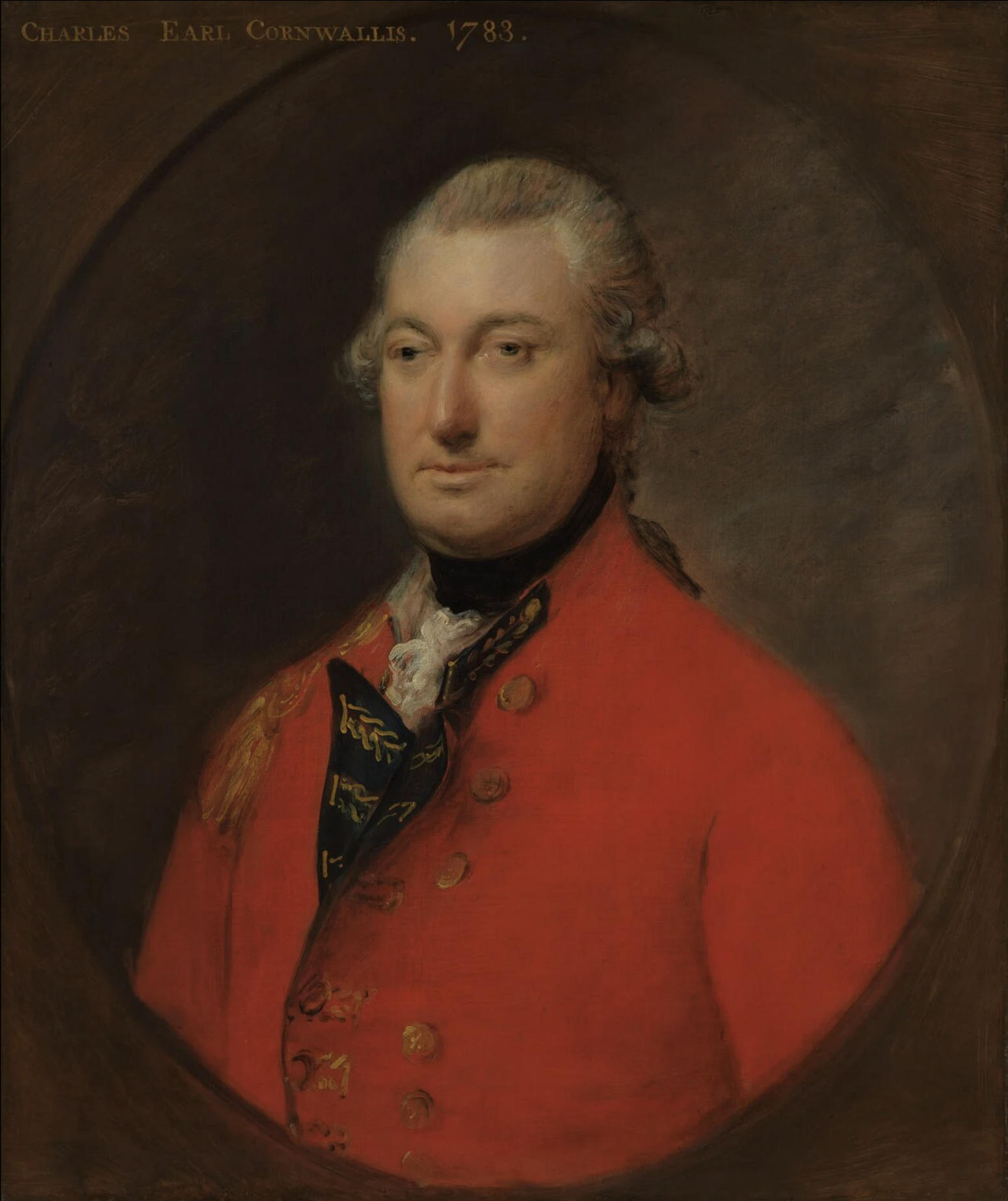
Portrait of Lord Cornwallis by Thomas Gainsborough, 1783

British General Charles Cornwallis, the 1st Marquess Cornwallis was appointed in June 1798 to serve as both Lord Lieutenant of Ireland and Commander-in-Chief of Ireland, the highest civil and military posts in the Kingdom of Ireland. He held these offices until 1801. Cornwallis had specific instructions and authority to deal with the Irish Rebellion of 1798, which had broken out in May 1798. He took steps to ensure that justice was consistently applied to captured rebels, personally reviewing a significant number of court cases. He directed military operations when a French invasion force landed at Killala Bay in August 1798.

In the aftermath of the rebellion, the political climate with regard to Ireland became dominated by the idea that the union of the Irish and British kingdoms (which were in personal union under the sovereignty of King George III) was necessary to improve conditions in Ireland. Cornwallis favoured union, but believed that it would also require Catholic emancipation (the granting of basic civil rights to the predominantly Roman Catholic Irish population) to create a lasting peace. While Cornwallis was instrumental in achieving the passage of the Act of Union in 1800 by the Irish Parliament, he and Prime Minister William Pitt were unable to convince the king of the merits of Catholic emancipation. This difference of opinion led to the fall of Pitt's government. Cornwallis also resigned, and was replaced in May 1801 by the Earl of Hardwicke.

== Background ==
Charles Cornwallis, 1st Marquess Cornwallis, was a British general, civil administrator, and diplomat. His early career was primarily military in nature, including a series of well-known campaigns during the War of American Independence from 1776 to 1781 that culminated in his surrender at Yorktown. This was followed in 1786 by a period of service as Commander-in-Chief and Governor-General of India. There he oversaw the consolidation of British power throughout most of southern India, primarily at the expense of the Kingdom of Mysore and its vassals, and introduced administrative reforms that had long-term consequences. In 1794 he returned to England, which was then militarily engaged in the French Revolutionary Wars. After he was sent on an ultimately fruitless diplomatic mission to stop the fighting, he was appointed master of the ordnance, a post he held until 1798.

The Kingdom of Ireland was at this time in personal union with the Kingdom of Great Britain, and therefore was under the rule of King George III, although it had separate political and administrative institutions. Members of the Parliament of Ireland were only elected by Protestants, as the Roman Catholic property owners had been disenfranchised in 1728. The majority Catholics had, over the previous century, been progressively stripped of other rights as well. King George was represented in civil affairs by the Lord Lieutenant of Ireland, who ruled in consultation with a privy council, and in military affairs by a Commander-in-Chief.

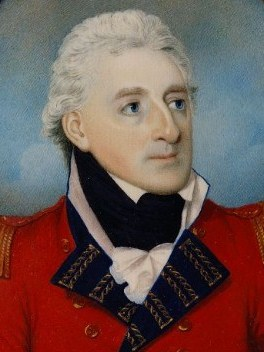
Miniature portrait of General Gerard Lake, by George Place

The demands of the American War of Independence had forced King George to withdraw many troops from Ireland for service in North America. To bolster forces supportive of the king, Protestants raised militia companies called the Irish Volunteers to replace the departing regulars. Protestant leaders in the Irish Parliament, including Henry Flood and Henry Grattan, who had the support of the Volunteers, convinced the British Parliament to pass a series of acts known collectively as the Constitution of 1782, giving the Irish Parliament significant political independence.

Unlike many English, Flood and Grattan were also proponents of Catholic emancipation, and under their leadership the Irish Parliament overturned a number of the restrictions on the rights of Catholics, although they continued to be unable to vote or hold elected offices. When the French Revolution broke out in the early 1790s, Catholics and middle-class Protestants united to form the Society of United Irishmen. They successfully extracted additional rights, although there was some Protestant resistance to the idea of full Catholic suffrage due to their overwhelming numerical majority. The more radical elements favouring Irish independence found a leader in Theobald Wolfe Tone, who went to France for support from the revolutionaries there that led to an aborted attempt to invade Ireland in 1796. The failed invasion led the government of the Earl of Camden to round up leaders of the United Irishmen and attempt to disarm the Catholic populace. Use of these tactics was made possible in part by the passage of an Insurrection Act, giving the administration broad police powers, and also by the suspension of habeas corpus in October 1796.

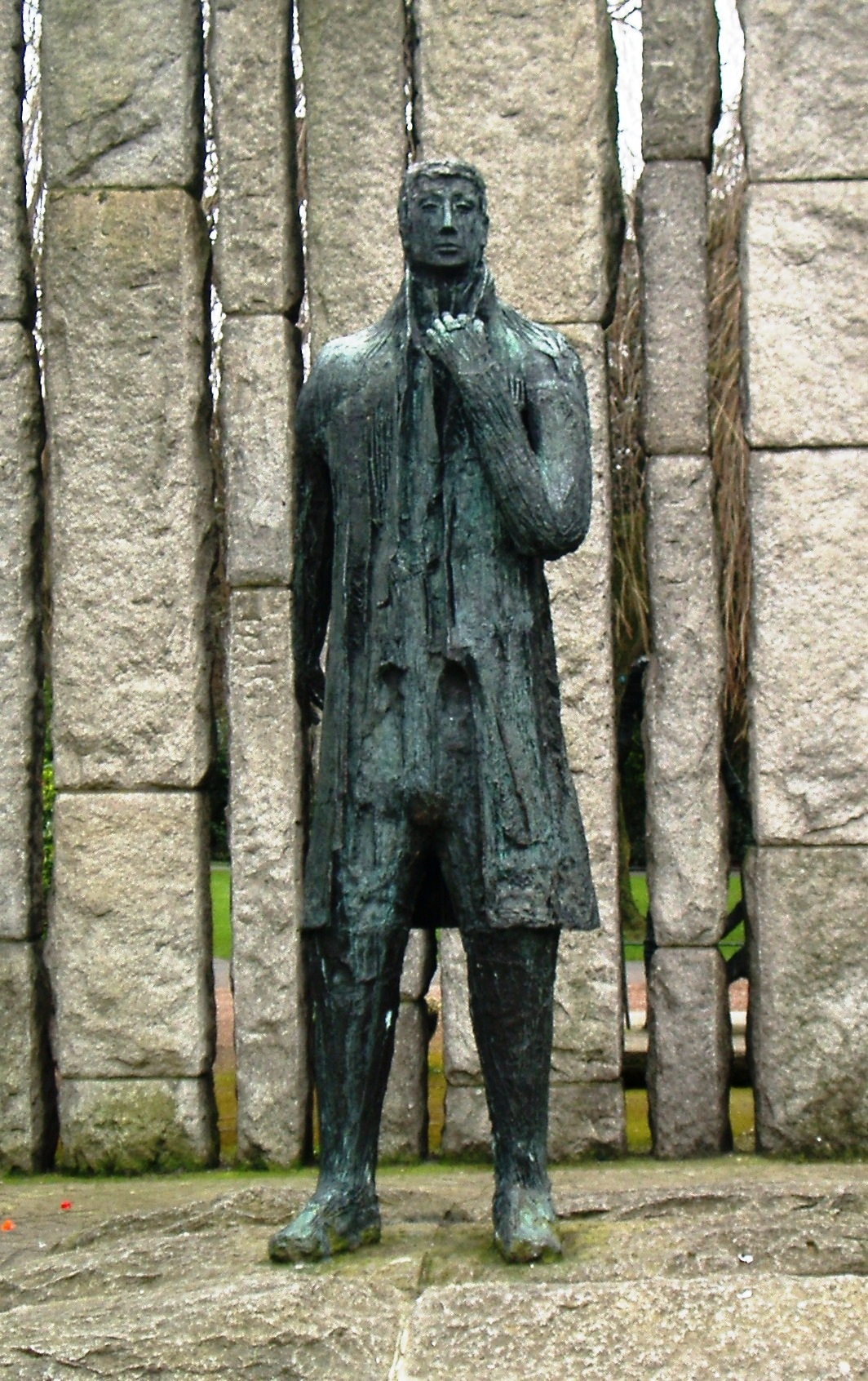
Statue of Wolfe Tone by Edward Delaney

By mid-May 1798 the Commander-in-Chief, General Gerard Lake had organised British troops and the Irish Volunteers to put down elements of the growing rebellion. These actions, sometimes capricious and brutal, fanned the flames of rebellion. While Lake's actions had been effective in Dublin, rebel leaders successfully orchestrated the simultaneous start of widespread hostilities on 23 May. News of the rebellion reached London a few days later, taking the British cabinet by surprise. Lord Camden had assured the Home Secretary, the Duke of Portland, that rebellion was unlikely in a letter written less than two weeks earlier. Camden, predicting a protracted and bloody struggle, sent his family to safety in England, undermining William Pitt's confidence in him.

== Appointment ==
Lord Camden had suggested Cornwallis for the position of Commander-in-Chief as early as 1797, since he was unhappy with Lake's heavy-handed leadership. Cornwallis refused this initial offer because the position was subservient to that of the Lord Lieutenant, which he felt would diminish its effectiveness. In March 1798, Camden suggested to Pitt that he be replaced as Lord Lieutenant with Cornwallis, and then in May suggested that Cornwallis be offered both posts, an arrangement similar to the position he held in India. Cornwallis was aware of the discussions around these later proposals, and he agreed to the idea in discussions with Pitt in early June. On 13 June, King George's Privy Council approved his appointment to both posts. On 21 June, Cornwallis arrived in Dublin to take command. While these discussions went on, General Lake directed the response to the rebellion. On the day Cornwallis landed, the back of the rebellion was broken with a British victory over a large rebel force at Vinegar Hill.

== Rebellion ==
=== Irish remnants ===
As the British military and loyal militia mopped up the remnants of the rebellion in Wexford and other counties, the atrocities and sectarian violence left a mark on Cornwallis. He wrote that "the life of a Lord Lieutenant of Ireland comes up to my idea of a perfect misery; but if I can achieve the great object of consolidating the British Empire, I shall be sufficiently repaid." In early July he issued a proclamation offering amnesty to rebels who laid down their arms and took an oath to the crown, and he cracked down on the sometimes arbitrary courts martial held in the field by requiring the review of all sentences in Dublin. However, not all of Ireland received this treatment: areas that were still "disturbed" were exempted from the requirement, Lord Castlereagh, Cornwallis' Chief Secretary, reported that "numbers were tried and executed" without the lord lieutenant's review. One principal stronghold of the rebels was the Wicklow Mountains, through which the army began construction of a road to facilitate its operations. The Wicklow Military Road survives today as the R115 road in Wexford and Dublin.

Cornwallis also negotiated with the parliament the passage of a bill offering amnesty to most of the rebels. This idea was vigorously opposed both in the Protestant-controlled Irish Parliament and in London. By the time the bill passed and received the royal signature in October, it contained numerous exceptions, meaning that anyone with a role of significance in the rebellion was likely not eligible. The bill was also enacted too late to be of significant benefit anyway. He offered financial compensation for losses incurred by loyalists, the terms of which were significantly abused, as claims were often made well in excess of actual losses. This policy of lenience was furthermore disliked by politically influential Protestants, which complicated some of Cornwallis's later activities.

To finish putting down the rebellion and create a semblance of peace, Cornwallis needed more troops. Pitt had promised him 5,000 regulars and militia prior to his appointment. While regular troops were among the first to arrive, Ireland became a virtual garrison by September as militia companies flooded in. On 27 June, the Irish Parliament passed a bill Cornwallis introduced to regulate the use of English militia companies.

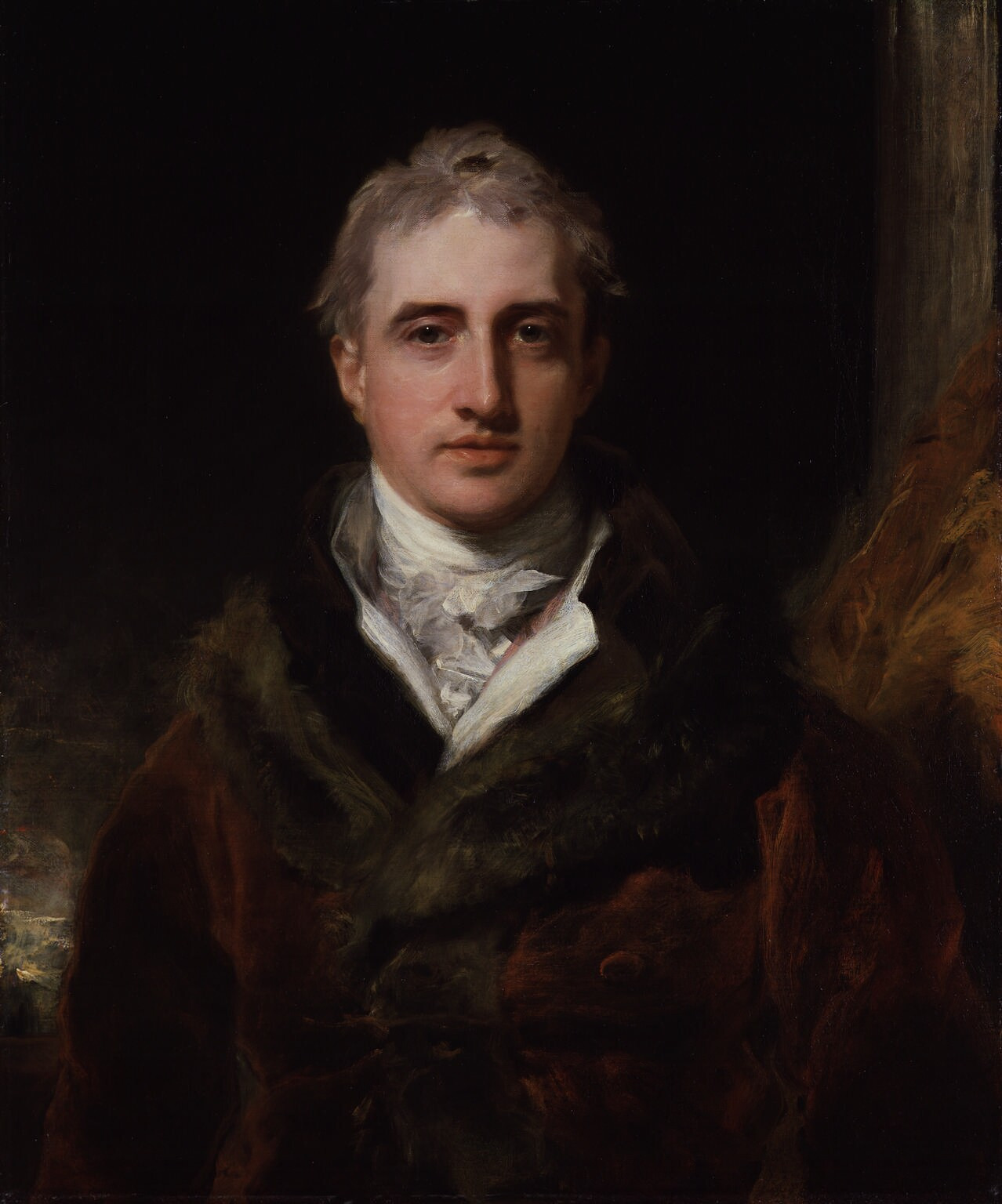
Lord Castlereagh

The rebel ringleaders were subjected to courts martial dominated by Protestants, something Cornwallis disliked but put up with. A few of the rebel leaders were tried for treason in July, and sentenced by Cornwallis to hang. This prompted a large number of prisoners, who had not yet been tried, to petition Cornwallis for banishment in exchange for their co-operation. Cornwallis agreed in principle, to stem the flow of blood that was still ongoing in the countryside, and out of concern that the rebellion might be renewed if French assistance arrived. The banishments in many cases were not carried out until 1799. In spite of some opposition, Cornwallis ultimately succeeded in having more than 400 rebels banished, primarily to Scotland. According to Lord Castlereagh, Cornwallis' Chief Secretary, Cornwallis personally reviewed 400 court cases, sentencing 131 to death.

=== French invasion ===
French support for Irish independence waned after the death of Lazare Hoche, one of its main proponents, and the driving force behind the 1796 invasion attempt. Napoleon considered an invasion of Great Britain in late 1797 and early 1798, but dropped the idea in February 1798 after seeing the poor condition of the navy. Napoleon instead chose to begin an expedition to Malta and Egypt in May, shortly before the Irish rebellion erupted. However, Wolfe Tone and other Irish dissidents in France managed to extract some assistance from the French Directory.

Cornwallis did not directly involve himself in military matters until the unexpected arrival on 22 August of French troops at Killala Bay in County Mayo, an area that had not seen much rebellious activity. A fleet of three ships had sailed from Rochefort in early August, carrying General Jean Humbert and over 1,000 French troops, pursuant to a plan that also included 3,000 troops to sail from Brest. When they landed, Humbert relatively quickly raised several hundred poorly disciplined recruits to join him, and began moving south.

News of Humbert's landing reached Dublin two days later. Cornwallis, fearing their presence would encourage renewed uprisings, stepped in to direct military matters. He despatched General Lake to oversee the defences at Castlebar, where Humbert appeared to be heading, with orders to avoid a confrontation until he had sufficient strength. On the morning of 27 August, Lake's force was routed in the "races of Castlebar". Most of the fleeing defenders ended up at Tuam, some 30 miles (48 km) from Castlebar, where Cornwallis went the next day with reinforcements. To bolster the forces, he reduced the garrisons at Dublin and Wexford significantly. Despite building a sizeable force (estimated at 10,000), Cornwallis was concerned about the quality of these forces, which included sizeable militia and yeomanry whose reliability in combat was uncertain. He also had to deal with their behaviour: actions of plunder and violence against locals in the early stages of the campaign prompted him to issue orders threatening immediate execution for soldiers caught stealing, and called on officers "to assist him in stopping the licentious behavior of the troops".

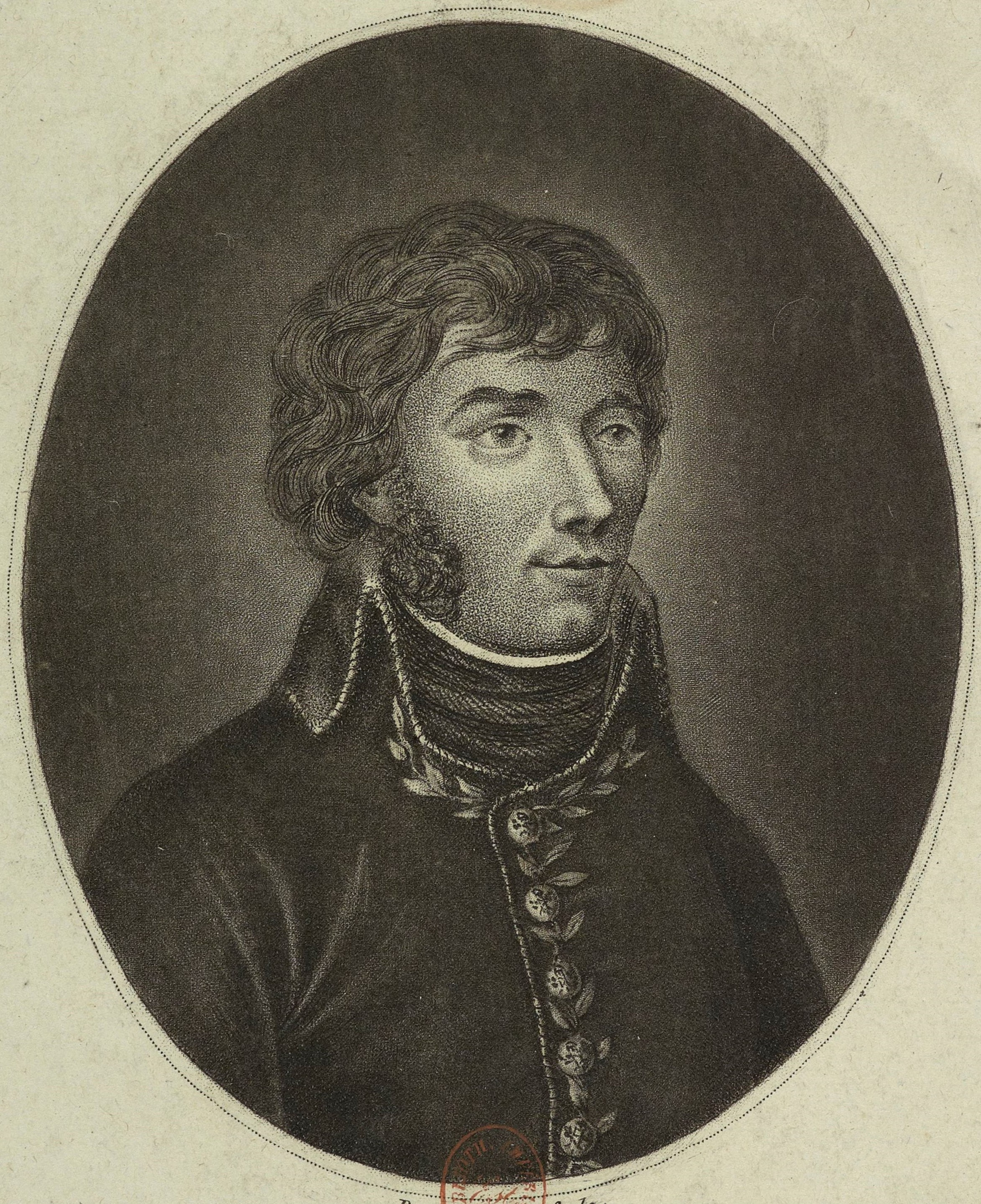
Jean Humbert

General Humbert, who knew he would be significantly outmanned until the arrival of the Brest fleet unless he could reignite the rebellion and raise more men, then led Cornwallis and Lake on a chase. Seeking to gain support in Ulster, Humbert rapidly moved north. Cornwallis detached Lake to follow Humbert, while he monitored Humbert's movements and kept positions between Humbert and Dublin. Humbert failed to gain significant local support, and was eventually trapped between the two forces at Ballinamuck. After a brief battle there on 8 September, Humbert surrendered. The fleet from Brest, carrying Wolfe Tone among others, sailed late, and attempted to escape British naval ships in an attempt to return to France; most of the fleet was captured, and Wolfe Tone was brought to Dublin in chains. According to one account, Cornwallis ordered a number of Humbert's Irish supporters to be killed by lottery. Pieces of paper, some marked "death", were placed in a hat. Prisoners then drew from the hat, and were immediately led to the gallows if they drew one of the marked papers.

Cornwallis was criticised for the slow pace with which he went after Humbert, and the large number of troops used to capture the relatively modest French army. However, supporters pointed out that all of the French force was captured, and there was no subsequent uprising. General John Moore countered some of the criticisms, noting that Cornwallis "always suspected the Shannon and Dublin to be the objects [of Humbert's movements], and by guarding against them in time he prevented much mischief. He showed much prudence and judgment in the service."

=== Aftermath ===
In the aftermath of the rebellion, Cornwallis came to believe that British policy toward Ireland was flawed, and that it was his job as Lord Lieutenant to promote measures that would benefit the entire population. This view brought him into conflict with both the Protestant elites in the Irish parliament, and the political establishment in London, even though he was in agreement with the latter that Ireland should be united with Great Britain.

In 1799 and 1800, Ireland was suffering from food shortages that were exacerbated by crop failures in 1799 and a shortage of milling capacity. When Cornwallis offered a bounty to food importers, Portland, the Home Secretary, objected. Cornwallis did take other steps, including the banning of distillation of spirits; he even considered arranging for imports of grain from America.

Attempting to act on a bequest by the recently deceased Bishop of Armagh for the establishment of a "university of Dissenters" there, Cornwallis proposed the establishment of a university for Presbyterians modelled on Trinity College Dublin. Portland opposed the move, arguing in a manner the Wickwires describe as specious that the dissenters did not require a university, and that Ireland only needed the one university it already had.

== Union ==
The Protestant elites in Ireland had previously petitioned for union with Great Britain early in the 18th century, principally to overcome London's essentially colonial treatment of the country, which included trade restrictions detrimental to Irish merchants and businessmen. The subject arose several times in Irish and British political circles, and William Pitt had decided that it was time to give the matter serious consideration by the time Cornwallis went to Dublin. British politicians saw the immediate aftermath of the rebellion as a particularly opportune moment to press the matter. King George wrote that his officials should use "the present moment of terror" to convince Irish political interests previously opposed to support the idea.

The Protestant Ascendancy stood to lose a great deal in union, as seats in parliament, a significant source of power to a relatively small number of families, would necessarily be reduced as a consequence. To counter this assault on their power base, Cornwallis sought to use his power as lord lieutenant to grant government jobs (patronage) and peerages to essentially buy off enough votes in the Irish parliament so that it would vote itself out of existence. This task, which the Wickwires describe as "a program of wholesale bribery", was one that Cornwallis found extremely unpleasant.

=== Early setback ===
Cornwallis believed that the terms of union should include Catholic emancipation. While some rights had been restored in the early 1790s, Catholics were still denied elective offices and other rights. Almost everyone in the establishments of Dublin and London, including the king and much of Pitt's cabinet, opposed this, leading Cornwallis to write that "some mode must be adopted to soften the hatred of the Catholics to our government". In a letter to the Home Secretary he wrote, "I trust that your grace and His Majesty's other ministers will on no account consent to the insertion of any clause which shall unalterably bind the United Parliament to persevere in the exclusion of Catholics." Protestants, including the Lord Chancellor, Lord Clare, who favoured union, opposed Catholic emancipation. "I trust, and I hope I am not deceived, that they are fairly inclined to give them up, and to bring [union] forward unencumbered with the doctrine of emancipation." King George, after Cornwallis' appointment, wrote to Pitt that "Cornwallis must clearly understand that no indulgence can be granted to the Catholics farther than has been". Cornwallis' efforts to include support for emancipation clearly had negative repercussions. One Protestant wrote, "his silly conduct, his total incapacity, and self conceit and mulishness have alone lost the question [of union]", while another wrote to Castlereagh that Cornwallis had been rendered "not only an object of disgust, but of abhorrence."

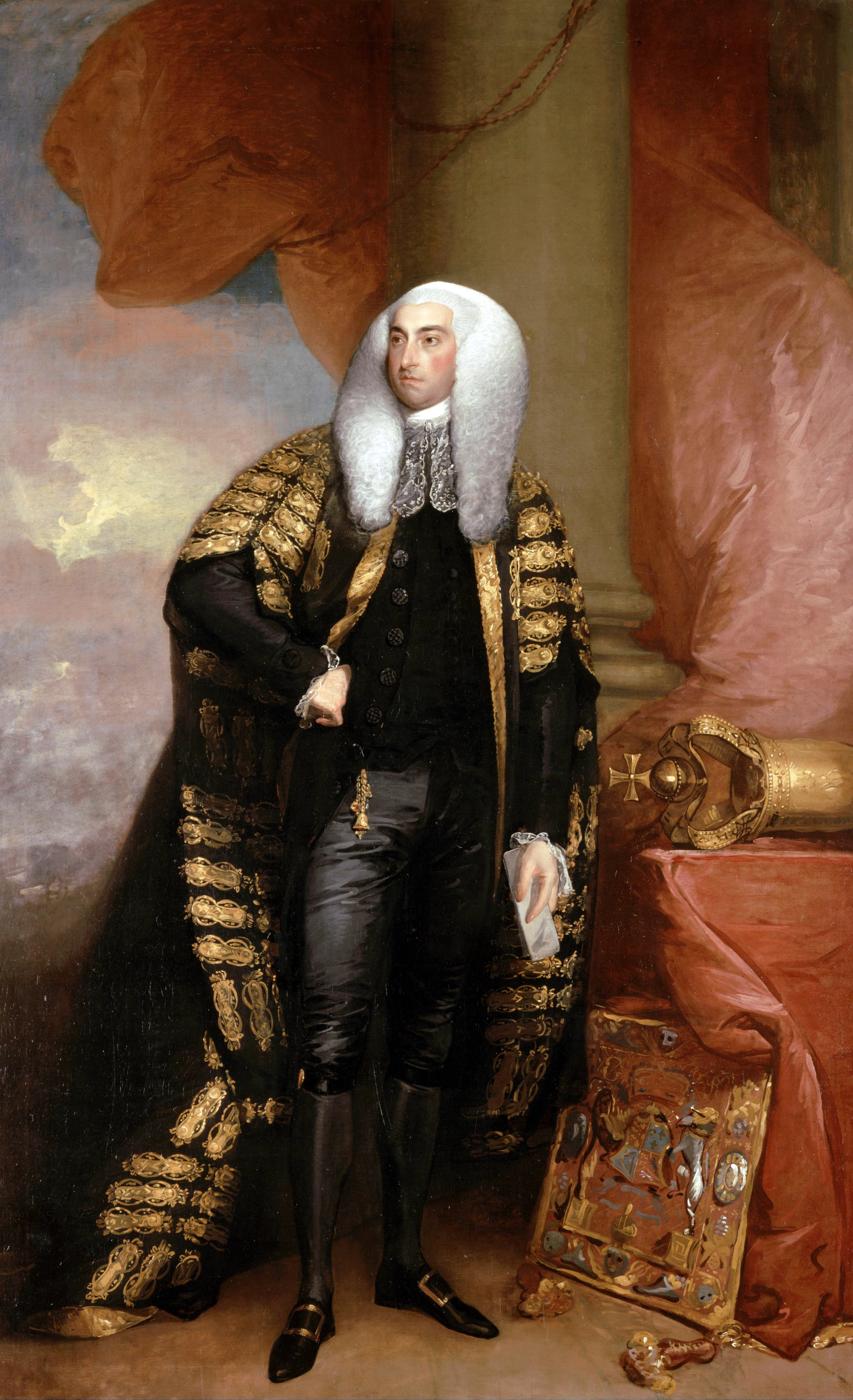
Lord Clare supported union, but opposed Catholic emancipation

None of this prevented Cornwallis, with the assistance of Castlereagh, from forging ahead with the raising of support for union in November 1798, after the rebellion had died down. Their politicking included firing government officials opposed to union and giving the jobs to supporters, and the offering of a small number of peerages. However, they could not overcome the rumours generated by early drafts of the details of union that appeared to conspire against the Protestant interests. In December 1798, trade groups representing lawyers, merchants, and bankers all came out against the idea. The principal objection was that there would be fewer seats available for Irish representation in the united parliament, resulting in a loss of power for those whose seats would not be retained. Cornwallis saw the trouble ahead, warning Portland that it was unlikely to pass.

On 22 January 1799, both the Irish and British parliaments met, and each heard a substantially similar address in favour of union delivered in London by the king, and in Dublin by the Lord Lieutenant. The Irish House of Commons, in a clear signal, agreed with the sentiments of the speech by only two votes. Castlereagh, who had been optimistic about the prospects of passage, informed Portland, "I should despair of the success of the measure at any future period, so weighty is the opposition ..., were I not convinced that their repugnance turns more upon points of personal interest, than a fixed aversion to the principle of union."

=== Building support ===
In the aftermath of the speech's poor reception, Pitt effectively promised Cornwallis carte blanche to build support for union. Portland wrote to Cornwallis, "I hope it is unnecessary to assure your excellency that whatever your decisions may be you may depend upon their receiving the unreserved sanction and support of His Majesty's servants." On the basis of these assurances, Cornwallis and Castlereagh developed a plan to coopt or convince enough of the propertied interests that controlled the parliament to support the union. Cornwallis found this task, which occupied much of the next year, to be extremely distasteful: "My occupation is now of the most unpleasant nature, negotiating and jobbing with the most corrupt people under heaven. I despise and hate myself every hour for engaging in such dirty work, and am supported only by the reflection that without an Union the British Empire must be dissolved." The task was made somewhat more pleasant by the arrival of his son for a short visit in July 1799.

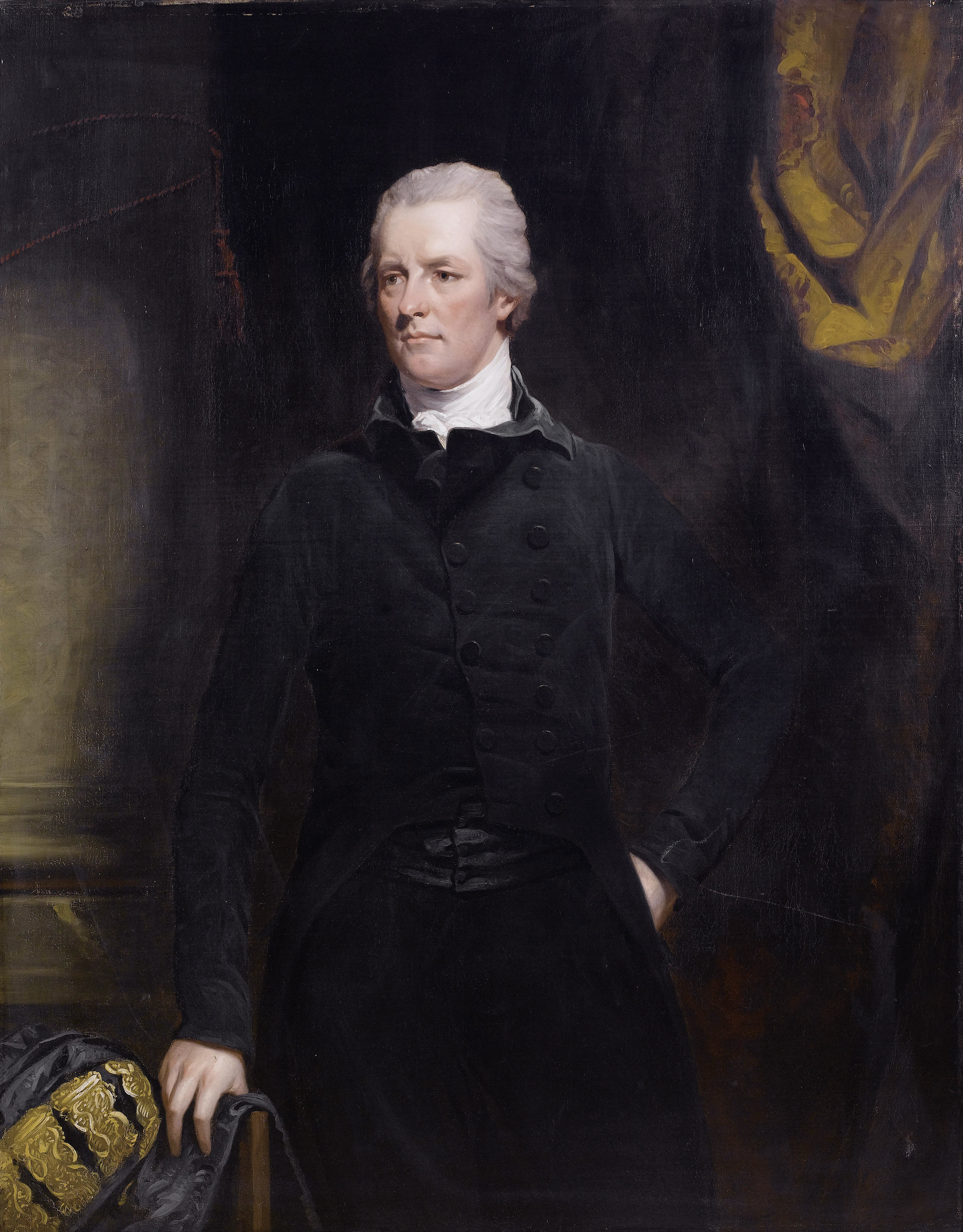
William Pitt the Younger, ca. 1804–1805.

Some of Cornwallis' opponents were particularly difficult to deal with. The Marquess of Downshire, who controlled eight seats in the Irish parliament, managed to convince his militia regiment to sign a petition in February 1800 opposing union; Cornwallis used his military authority to suspend Downshire from his command. When the news reached London, Downshire was stripped of further privileges by King George, and formally stripped of his colonel's commission. Others were more easily bought off with further promises of patronage and peerages. Cornwallis also worked to get support from Catholics, but was only able to make the vaguest promises concerning their rights due to the high-level resistance to the idea.

Debate for union began in the Irish parliament on 15 January 1800. Peers in the upper house, concerned that Irish peerages would be debased by the union, at first resisted; Cornwallis promised them that the king would phase out Irish peerages, issuing more British peerages instead. On 28 March the parliament passed resolutions indicating support for union, so Castlereagh formally introduced the Act of Union on 21 May. The bill was passed in June, and Cornwallis gave it the royal assent on 1 August, with the union to take effect on 1 January 1801. It included no provisions for Catholic rights. Clare, the Lord Chancellor, wrote, "I am now quite satisfied that [Cornwallis] has on the whole been the man of all others best selected for the crisis."

Some political opponents declared that the union had been accomplished by corrupt on the part of government officials. Jonah Barrington alleged that Castlereagh corruptly spent £1.5 million of treasury funds to achieve union, and Henry Grattan's son wrote that "the union ... was an act of power and corruption." This accusation was picked up by 19th-century historians, and persisted into 20th century historiography. Historian Patrick Geoghegan observes that the methods the government employed were not unusual for the time, and Donal McCartney observes "it would be old-fashioned, too nationalist, and much too simplistic to hold that the act of union was carried mainly because of the corrupt methods employed by the government."

=== Delivering on promises ===
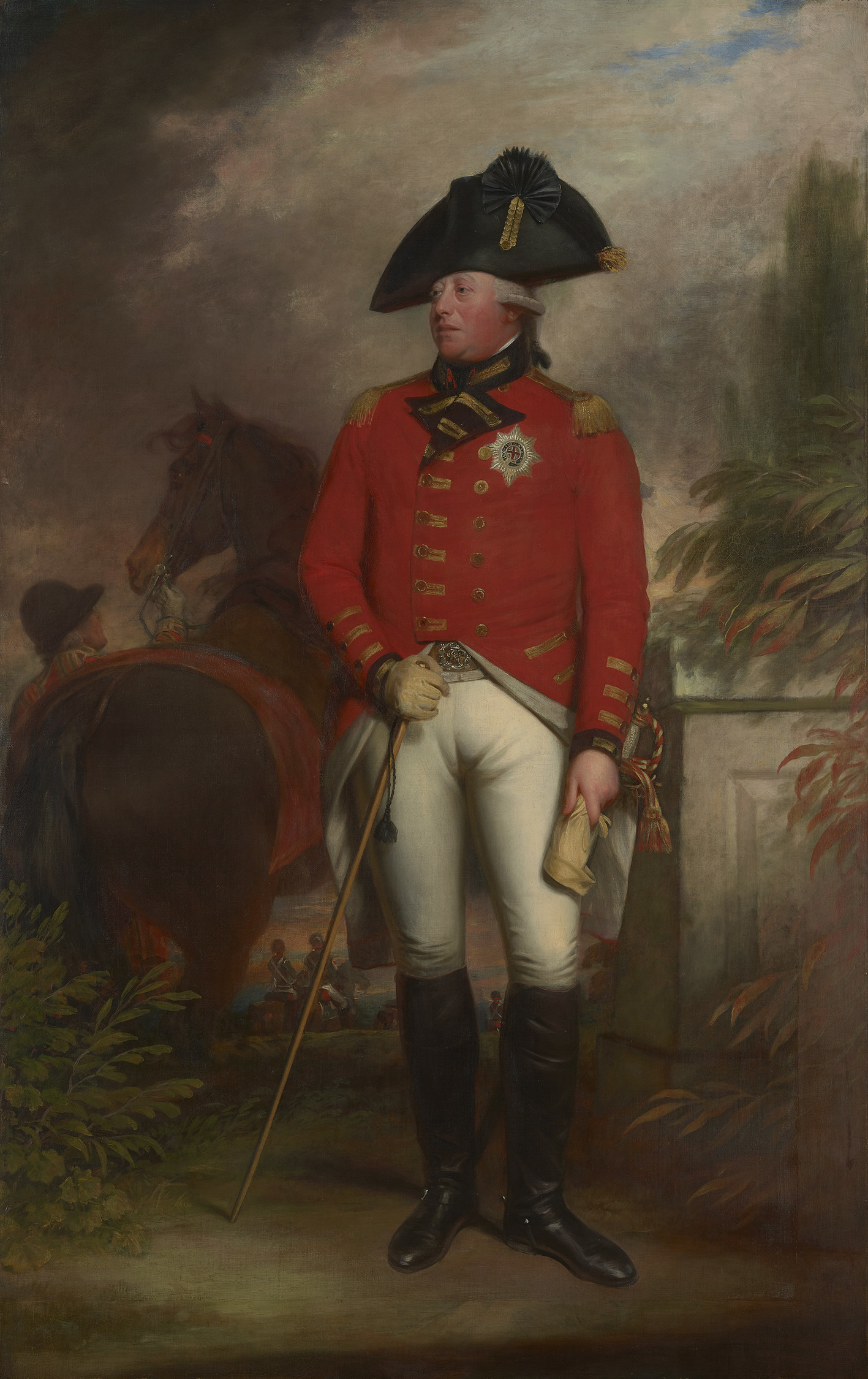
George III in 1799/1800 by Sir William Beechey.

After dissolving the Irish parliament, Cornwallis embarked on a goodwill tour of the island, and was generally well-received wherever he went; "not an unpleasant circumstance to a man who has governed a country above two years by martial law." Anticipating little trouble delivering on the many promises he had made, Cornwallis had forwarded to London a list of sixteen names to be granted peerages. The Home Secretary hedged, delayed, and refused many of them; Cornwallis threatened to resign, since he had staked his reputation on the matter.

"When the promise was given I thought that I had made a good bargain for the public, and in the progress of the business I have seen no cause to alter my opinion ... I am bound in honor to stand by it ... There was no sacrifice that I should not have been happy to make for the service of my king and country, except that of honor."

— Cornwallis to Portland, 17 June 1800

Castlereagh supported Cornwallis in his quest, and the pressure on the London cabinet succeeded. Portland informed Cornwallis that the cabinet would respond favourably, and it did. In the following months, many new peerages were issued, over and above those that Cornwallis requested.

Cabinet and royal support did not extend to Cornwallis's persistent requests for Catholic rights; he gave signs that he would eventually resign if action was not taken. Neither he nor Pitt, who had come to support him, was able to sway the king, who gave an anti-Catholic speech in January 1801. In response to this, Pitt requested the king's permission to resign. At an impasse over the issue, King George accepted Pitt's resignation on 5 February; Cornwallis also resigned, agreeing to remain in office until a successor arrived to replace him. On 25 May 1801, his successor, the Earl of Hardwicke, arrived in Dublin. Three days later, Cornwallis, delayed by bad weather, arrived at Holyhead, and returned to London.

== Legacy ==
Cornwallis' work on union and his position on Catholic emancipation, while unsuccessful at the time, were politically influential. Although he was unable to move the king on the issue of emancipation, his views may have played a role in the change of position on the issue by Lord Clare and Edward Cooke, another early critic of emancipation, and rendered its passage, according to one commentator, "only a question of time". Political movements toward emancipation continued, first under Henry Grattan, and then later under Daniel O'Connell, whose campaigns for Catholic rights in the 1820s led to the Roman Catholic Relief Act 1829.

Cornwallis next was engaged by the king in diplomatic efforts in Europe. He led the British diplomatic team whose negotiations with Napoleon resulted in the 1802 Treaty of Amiens. He was then offered a second tour of duty in India. After a difficult sea voyage, he died in India not long after arriving there in 1805. He is buried in Ghazipur, India.
