= Uyyalawada Narasimha Reddy =

Indian palegar and rebel leader (1806–1847)

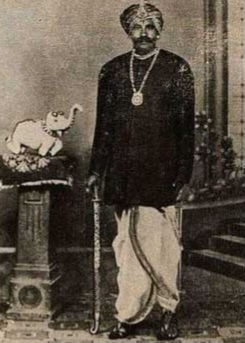
- Portrait of Reddy, 1840s
- Born: 24 November 1806; Rupanagudi, Uyyalawada, Koilkuntla, Madras Presidency, British India (Now Rupanagudi, Uyyalawada Mandal, Nandyal district, Andhra Pradesh, India)
- Died: 23 February 1847 (age 40); Koilkuntla, Cuddapah district, Madras Presidency, British India (Now in Koilkuntla, Nandyal district, Andhra Pradesh,India)
- Cause of death: Executed by hanging
- Spouse(s): 1 Siddamma 2 and 3 not known
- Children: Uyyalawada Dora Subbayah

Uyyalawada Narasimha Reddy was an Indian freedom fighter leader. Son of a Telugu Palegaaru Mallareddy and Seethamma, Narasimha Reddy was born in Rupanagudi village, on 24 November 1806. He belonged to the Motati Clan of Reddys. He and his commander-in-chief, Vadde Obanna were at the heart of a freedom movement against Company rule in India in 1847, where 5,000 Indian peasants rose up in revolt against the British East India Company in Nandyal district.

The rebels were protesting against the changes introduced by the Company authorities to the traditional agrarian system in the first half of the nineteenth century. These changes included the introduction of the ryotwari system and other attempts to maximize revenue through exploiting lower-status cultivators through implementing exploitative working conditions. The revolt took thousands of Company soldiers to suppress, with Reddy's death bringing it to an end.

== Early life ==
The father of Narasimha Reddy was related to the Palegar (Jagirdar) family of Uyyalawada in Koilakuntla taluk who had married two daughters of the Palegar of Nossam. He had three sons, of whom Narasimha was the youngest and only son of the younger daughter of the Palegar of Nossam, Seethamma.

== As a movement leader ==
The British East India Company's introduction to the Madras Presidency of the 1803 Permanent Settlement, which had first been enacted in Bengal Presidency ten years previously, replaced the agrarian socio-economic status quo with a more egalitarian arrangement where anyone could cultivate provided that they paid a fixed sum to the East India Company for the privilege of doing so.

The Palegars and other higher-status people who preferred the old agrarian system "represented the decadent social order", were in many cases "upstarts" and "were also the heirs of a social system in which various orders of Hindu society were integrated through ages". These people were dispossessed of their lands, which were then redistributed, but the primary purpose of the changes was to increase production rather than to restructure the social order. In some cases, it coincided with a punishment because among the dispossessed were those who had recently been involved in fighting the East India Company in the Palegar Wars. Some received pensions in lieu of the lost lands but at inconsistent rates.

The changes, which included the introduction of the ryotwari system and other attempts to maximize revenue, deprived village headmen and other higher-status people of their role as revenue collectors and position as landholders, while also impacting on lower-status cultivators by depleting their crops and leaving them impoverished. The population came to the view that the East India Company were economically exploiting them and that those who were dependent on the traditional system no longer had a means of making a living. As the old order collapsed into disarray, the once-authoritative Palegars, including Narasimha Reddy, became the focus of attention from sufferers, whose pleas fell on deaf ears. The Palegars saw a chance to mobilize peasant opposition both for genuine social reasons.

Narasimha Reddy's own objections too was based on their outcomes. Compared to the Palegar of Nossam, the pension awarded to his family upon their dispossession was paltry and the authorities refused to increase it by redistributing some of the Nossam monies when that latter family became extinct in 1821. At the same time, some of his relatives were facing proposals for further reductions in their land rights, including by a reform of the village policing system.

== War against the British ==
Things came to a head in 1846 when the Company authorities assumed land rights previously held by various people who had died in the villages of Goodladurty, Koilakuntla and Nossum. Encouraged by the discontent of others, Reddy became the figurehead for an uprising.

An armed group, initially comprising those dispossessed of inam lands around Koilakuntla, was led by Reddy's Right-hand man Vadde Obanna in July 1846. The Acting Collector for the area Lord Cochrane, believed that Reddy had material support from fellow pensioners in Bhagyanagar and Kurnool, whose land rights had also been appropriated. The group soon attracted support from the peasantry and was reported by Company authorities to have rampaged in Koilkuntla, taking back the looted treasury there and evading the police before killing several officers at Mittapally. They also plundered Rudravaram before moving to an area near Almore, pursued by the East India Company forces who then surrounded them.

A battle between Obanna's 5000-strong band of rebels and a much smaller British contingent then took place, with around 200 of the rebels being killed and others captured before they were able to break out in the direction of Kothakota, Giddalur where Reddy's family were situated. Having collected his family, he and the rest of his contingent moved into the Nallamala Hills. The British offered incentives for information regarding the whereabouts of the rebels, who were again surrounded amidst reports that unrest was now growing in other villages of the area. In a further skirmish between the rebels and the British, who had sent for reinforcements, 40–50 rebels were killed and 90 were captured, including Reddy. Although there was no evidence of Obanna's capture, he most possibly was also a captive along with his leader.

Warrants were issued for the arrest of nearly 1,000 of the rebels, of which 412 were released without charge. A further 273 were bailed and 112 were convicted. Reddy, too, was convicted and in his case received the death penalty. On 22 February 1847, he was executed in Koilkuntla in front of a crowd of over 2000 people.

Reddy's head on the fort wall was in public view until 1877. The East India Company reported in their district manual of 1886 that

Since 1839 nothing of political importance has occurred, unless we mention the disturbance in 1847 caused by Narasimha Reddy, a pensioned Palegar of Uyyalawada in Koilakuntla Taluk, then part of Kadapa district. He received a pension of ₹11 a month. As a grandson of Jayaram Reddy, the last powerful Zamindar of Nossam, he was sorely disappointed when the Government refused to pay him any portion of the lapsed pension of that family. Just before this time, the question of resuming Kattubadi Inams was brought under the consideration of Government, which made the Kattubadis discontented. Narasimha Reddy collected these men and attacked the Koilakuntla treasury. He moved from place to place and sheltered himself in thepi hill forts of the Erramalas and Nallamalas, and though pursued by troops from Kadapa and Kurnool, he continued to commit his ravages in Koilakuntla and Cumbum. At Giddalur he gave battle to Lieutenant Watson and killed the Tahsildar of Cumbum. He then escaped into the Nallamalas, and after roving about the hills for several months was caught near Perusomala on a hill in Koilakuntla taluk and hanged. His head remained hung on the gibbet in the fort until 1877 when the scaffold finally fell into decay.

== Legacy ==
The Renati Chandrula Smaraka Samithi is a committee which was formed for preserving the memory of Reddy and the Budda Vengal Reddy, both of whom were born in village of Uyyalawada. In 2015, it published a book in both Telugu and English, titled Renati Surya Chandrulu (The Sun and Moon of Renadu).

On 25 March 2021, the Kurnool airport at Orvakal was named after him as Uyyalawada Narasimha Reddy Airport.

== In popular culture ==
A movie based on Narasimha Reddy's inspiring life, Sye Raa Narasimha Reddy directed by Surender Reddy and starring Chiranjeevi in the title role, was released in the Telugu film industry on 2 October 2019 on the eve of Gandhi Jayanti.
