= Vaddera =

Artisan Caste found in Andhra Pradesh, Telangana, Tamil Nadu and Maharashtra

Vaddera (alternatively Vadde, Vaddi, Odde, Odderazu) is a caste of Stone - Masons and found primarily in Andhra Pradesh, Telangana, Tamil Nadu, and Maharashtra. They are classified as an Other Backward Class (OBC) by the Government of India.

== Etymology and origin ==
The name Vaddera or Odde is considered a corruption of the Sanskrit word Odhra, referring to the region now known as Orissa (Odisha). The Andhra Pradesh Backward Classes Commission (1970) records: "This is a caste of tank diggers, well sinkers, road makers, and earth-workers who originally came from Orissa. The word 'Odde' or 'Vadde' is said to be a corruption of the Sanskrit word 'Odhra' now known as Orissa."

Edgar Thurston in Castes and Tribes of Southern India (1909) also confirms: "They are Telugu people, who came originally from Orissa, whence their name." The Nellore Manual cited by Thurston notes that besides Telugu, they speak a separate dialect among themselves, which, if confirmed as Oriya, would further establish their Orissan origin.

== History ==
Medieval-era records from the Vijayanagara Empire mention Odde alongside Karana and Telugu as distinct groups in royal edicts. Scholars have noted that whether Odde in this context refers to a caste identity, a regional identity (people of the Odra country), or both simultaneously remains an open question.

A study on the socio-economic history of medieval Andhra Desa identifies Odde Rajus of Surya Vamsa among the castes recorded in villages of the Vijayanagaram and Bobbili area, alongside Odra Brahmins and Kalinga Komatis, suggesting the possible presence of a Odde -linked landowning or administrative group in that region during the medieval period. Whether the Odde Rajus of these inscriptions are directly ancestral to the present Odde community has not been conclusively established by historians.

The community's traditional occupations — stone-cutting, well-sinking, tank construction, and road-making — made them essential contributors to infrastructure across South India. Thurston described them as "the navvies of the country," noting that "they execute earthwork more rapidly than any other class, so that they have got almost a monopoly of the trade."

During British rule, the Oddes were classified under the Criminal Tribes Act, a designation that severely restricted their mobility and economic opportunities. After Indian independence, this classification was revoked, and the community was placed in the Other Backward Class category.

== Sub-divisions ==
Thurston (1909) recorded the following sub-divisions among the Odde:

- Kallu or Rati (stone-workers) and Mannu (earth-workers)—occupational divisions between which intermarriage was reportedly not practised
- Natapuram and Uru (village men)—settled sections
- Bidaru (wanderers)—a nomadic section
- Konga—a territorial sub-division
- Beri—recorded as a sub-caste
- In Ganjam, Bolasi is recorded as a sub-division

The synonym Odderazu (literally "Odde kings") was officially recorded in the 1901 Census as an alternate name for the caste.

== Notable people ==
- Vadde Obanna—19th-century freedom fighter and military commander under Uyyalawada Narasimha Reddy, who led a guerrilla campaign against British forces. His birth anniversary (11 January) has been declared a state festival by the Government of Andhra Pradesh.
- Jayamangala Venkata Ramana—Former MLA of Kaikalur constituency and Member of the Andhra Pradesh Legislative Council, elected under the YSRCP in 2023.

== Bibliography ==
- Thurston, Edgar (1909). Castes and Tribes of Southern India. Vol. V. Madras: Government Press.
- Andhra Pradesh Backward Classes Commission (1970). Report. p. 185.
- Ravula Soma Reddy (2007). Studies in the Socio-economic History of Medieval Andhra Desa. Research India Press.
- Berger, Peter; Heidemann, Frank, eds. (2013). The Modern Anthropology of India: Ethnography, Themes and Theory. Routledge. ISBN 978-1-134-06111-2.
