= Renadu =

Historical region in the Indian state of Andhra Pradesh

Renadu is the catchment and flowing area of Kundu River. This region in Rayalaseema was ruled by Telugu Chodas of Renadu and Pottapi from late 5th century CE to 11th century CE.

Kundu River starts at Uppalapadu Village of Orvakal Mandal in Nandyala District. It flows through Orvakal, Gadivemula, Nandyal, Koilkuntla, Uyyalawada, areas of Nandyal district and Jammalamadugu, Proddatur areas of Kadapa district and merge with Penna River near Kamalapuram, Kadapa District.

The heart of Renadu is an area containing the lands of Nossam, Uyyalawada, Koilkuntla, Owk, Jammalamadugu, and Proddatur which now form part of the Nandyal district and Kadapa district in the Indian state of Andhra Pradesh.

Uyyalawada Narasimha Reddy and Budda Vengalareddy are the two leaders of the region remembered for their revolt against the British Raj.
