= Vadde Obanna =

Indian freedom fighter (1807–1846)

- Born: 11 January 1807; Nossam village, Nandyal district, Andhra Pradesh, India
- Died: 6 October 1846 (aged 39)
- Cause of death: Killed in action against the British East India Company
- Occupations: Military commander, freedom fighter
- Known for: Commander-in-chief of the Uyyalawada Narasimha Reddy rebellion

Vadde Obanna (11 January 1807 – 6 October 1846) was an Indian freedom fighter and military commander who served as commander-in-chief under Uyyalawada Narasimha Reddy in the armed rebellion against the British East India Company in the Ceded Districts of Madras Presidency in 1846. He belonged to the OddeRazu community and is recognised as one of the earliest anti-colonial resistance figures from the Telugu-speaking region.

== Early life ==
Vadde Obanna was born on 11 January 1807 in Nossam village, near Nandyal, in present day Nandyal district of Andhra Pradesh. His father, Vadde Subbaiah, served as a village guard in one of the village ruled by The family of Uyyalawada Narasimha Reddy. His mother's name was Subbamma. Obanna belonged to the OddeRazu community, a community of stonemasons and earthworkers found across Andhra Pradesh and Telangana. The Family of Obanna were loyal Subordinates to Narasimha Reddy's Family since generations, with this loyalty Obbana proudly served as the Commander in chief Uyyalawada Narsimha Reddy Rebellion.

== Role as Military Commander ==
In 1845, Obanna joined Narasimha Reddy's uprising against British revenue policies, triggered by the suspension of village guards' salaries, denial of pensions to Reddy's family, and heavy taxation on farmers during famine. Appointed commander-in-chief, Obanna led the military operations of the rebellion across the Nallamala region of southern Andhra. By July 1846, the combined force had grown to approximately 9,000 fighters drawn from the Vadde, Boya, and Chenchu communities as well as aggrieved peasants and dispossessed palegars.

On 10 July 1846, Obanna led the assault on the Kovelakuntla subtreasury, one of the rebellion's most significant operations, in which the tahsildar and treasury officials were killed and funds were seized. The rebel forces subsequently carried out raids at Rudravaram and other locations, evading Company forces across the Nallamala forests and building fortifications armed with cannons.

Obanna was killed by British forces on 6 October 1846. His leader Narasimha Reddy was captured, tried, and publicly executed on 22 February 1847 in Koilkuntla.

== Legacy ==
The Government of Andhra Pradesh has officially declared 11 January as Vadde Obanna Jayanti, observed annually in his honour. Obanna is remembered as one of the unsung figures of early anti colonial struggle in Telugu history.
