= Cornwallis Code =

1793 legislation enacted by East India Company to consolidate its rule of India

The Cornwallis Code is a body of legislation enacted in 1793 by the East India Company to improve the governance of its territories in India. The Code was developed under the guidance of Charles, Marquess Cornwallis, who served as Governor of Bengal from 1786 to 1793.

== Code contains ==
The code contained significant provisions governing, policing and judicial and civil administration. Its best known provision was the Permanent Settlement (or the zamindari system), which established a revenue collection scheme that lasted until the 20th century. Beginning with Bengal, the system spread over all of northern India by means of the issue of a series of regulations dated 1 May 1793. On these the government of British India virtually rested until the Charter Act 1833.

The system, as codified in these regulations, provided that the East India Company's service personnel be divided into three branches: revenue, judicial, and commercial. Private trade was forbidden to the members of the first two branches, and they were instead compensated by a new and generous scale of pay. The land revenue assessment (the major source of revenue) was fixed permanently with zamindars, or hereditary revenue collectors. These native Indians, provided they paid their land taxes punctually, were treated as landowners, but they were deprived of magisterial and police functions, which were discharged by a newly organized government police. This “permanent settlement” provided the British with an Indian landed class interested in supporting British authority. The local administration was placed in the hands of the revenue collectors of districts. The judiciary was reorganized; there were district judges with magisterial powers responsible to provincial courts in civil cases and to courts of circuit in criminal cases. The law administered was Hindu and Muslim personal law and a modified Muslim criminal code. The higher ranks of the services were restricted to the British, thus depriving the Indians of any responsible office.

As a whole, the system gave social and political stability to Bengal at the price of neglecting the rights of the lesser landholders and undertenants and of excluding Indians from any responsible share in the administration.
