= Rudravaram mandal =

- Mandal
- Interactive map outlining mandal
- Location in Andhra Pradesh, India
- Coordinates: 15.2411°N 78.6026°E
- Country: India
- State: Andhra Pradesh
- District: Nandyal
- Headquarters: Rudravaram, Nandyal district

Population
  - Total: 49,003

Languages
  - Official: Telugu
- Time zone: UTC+5:30 (IST)
- Vehicle registration: AP

Rudravaram mandal is one of the 29 mandals in Nandyal district of the state of Andhra Pradesh in India. It is under the administration of Nandyal revenue division, and the headquarters are located at Rudravaram, Nandyal district.
