= Sanarudravaram =

- Village
- Interactive map of Sanarudravaram
- Location in Andhra Pradesh, India Sanarudravaram (India)
- Coordinates: 16°30′N 81°16′E
- Country: India
- State: Andhra Pradesh
- District: Eluru

Government
  - Type: Democratic
  - Body: Panchayatraj

Area
  - Total: 13.84 km^{2} (5.34 sq mi)

Population (2011)
  - Total: 4,110
  - Density: 297/km^{2} (769/sq mi)

Languages
  - Official: Telugu
- Time zone: UTC+5:30 (IST)

Sanarudravaram is a village in Kalidindi mandal, located in Eluru district of the Indian state of Andhra Pradesh.

== Geography ==
Pothumarru is located at 16°31'46"N 81°18'46"E.
