= Robert Home =

British painter

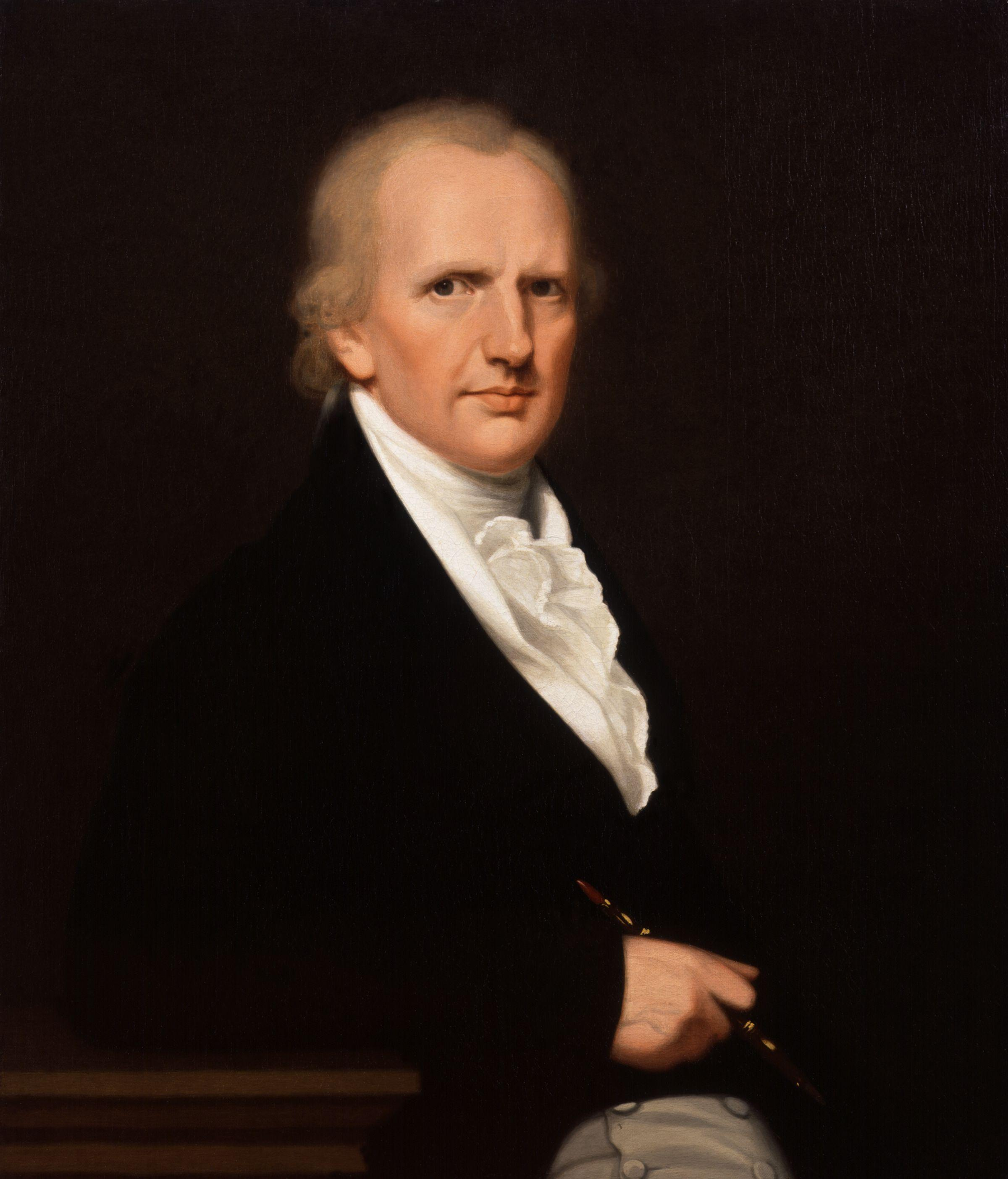
Self portrait, 1810s

Robert Home (1752–1834) was a British oil portrait painter who travelled to the Indian subcontinent in 1791. During his travels he also painted historic scenes and landscapes.

== Life and work ==
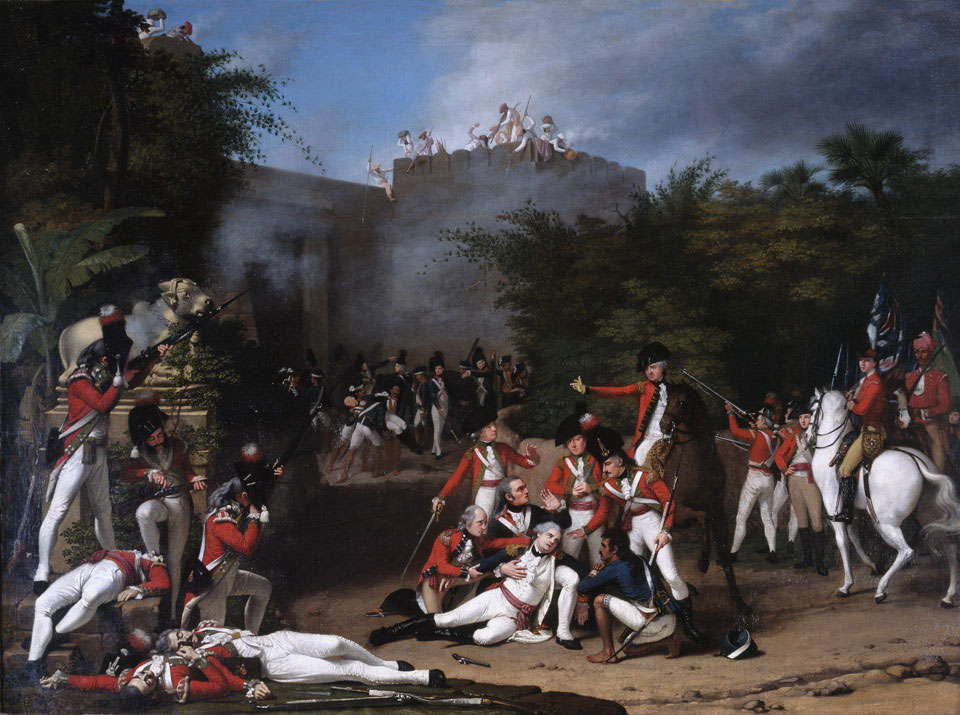
The Death of Colonel Moorhouse at the Storming of the Pettah Gate of Bangalore (1793)

Born in Hull in the United Kingdom as the son of an eminent army surgeon from Greenlaw in Berwickshire, He trained with Angelica Kauffman, who lodged with his family in London in 1766, and then at the Royal Academy Schools in 1769. He went to Rome in 1773 for further training and remained in Italy until 1777. From 1783 to 1789 he worked in Dublin and London before leaving for India in 1790. On 5 February 1791, Home was allowed to follow Lord Cornwallis' army in the Third Anglo-Mysore War as it moved towards Bangalore.

Home painted some of his well-known paintings such as The Hostage Princes leaving home with the Vakil, Ghulam Ali and Lord Cornwallis Receiving Tipu Sahib's Sons while he was in South India. In November 1792, Home came into contact with artists Thomas Daniell and William Daniell who inspired him to continue painting landscapes. He visited Mahabalipuram in January/February 1793 and the two paintings he painted as a result, titled Ruins of Mahabalipuram are now in the collection of The Asiatic Society, Kolkata.

In 1795 Home arrived in Calcutta (Kolkata) and continued his work there as an established artist. He was for some time Secretary of the Society and the first Library-in-Charge (1804), and donated his small but valuable art collection. In 1814 he moved to Lucknow and became a court painter of Nawab Ghazi-ud-Din Haider (1769–1827). In 1827, he travelled to Kanpur, where he died in 1834.

His Select Views in Mysore, the Country of Tippoo Sultan were published in London and Madras in 1794, and in Calcutta he made 215 watercolours of Indian mammals, birds and reptiles, some of which he also worked up as oils.
