= Rudravaram, Achampeta mandal =

Rudravaram Rudragiri (Orvakallu)
- Village
- Interactive map of Rudravaram
- Location in Andhra Pradesh, India
- Coordinates: 16.602389°N 80.163275°E
- Country: India
- State: Andhra Pradesh
- District: Palnadu
- Elevation: 38 m (125 ft)

Population
  - Total: 1,600

Languages
  - Official: Telugu
- Time zone: UTC+5:30 (IST)
- PIN: 522410
- Telephone code: 08640
- Vehicle registration: AP-07

Rudravaram is a village in Achampeta mandal, Palnadu district, Andhra Pradesh, India. It is near to Orvakal revenue village.

== Geography ==
Rudravaram is located at 16.602389°N 80.163275°E. It has an average elevation of 198 meters (652 feet).
