= Koilakuntla =

Koilkuntla town
- Town
- Koilakuntla Railway Station
- Interactive map of Koilkuntla town
- Location in Andhra Pradesh, India
- Coordinates: 15.2333°N 78.3167°E
- Country: India
- State: Andhra Pradesh
- District: Nandyal

Population
  - Total: 36,105

Languages
  - Official: Telugu
- Time zone: UTC+5:30 (IST)
- PIN: 518134
- Telephone code: 08510

Koilakuntla (also called as Kovelakuntla, Koyalakuntla, Koilkuntla) is a town in Nandyal district of the Indian state of Andhra Pradesh. It is Head quarter of Koilakuntla mandal. It is in Banaganapalli revenue division.

== Geography ==
Koilakuntla is located at 15.2334°N 78.3167°E. It has an average elevation of 185 meters (610 feet). 85 km south of Kurnool town. There is a famous temple called Panduranga Swamy Temple which is established by king Penukonda Rajullu in 1560-1570.It has pond in front of the temple. The lady named Koilla guided the king to build the temple and due to the pond in front of the temple, the town was named as Koilakuntla. There is a confluence of Kundu river and Juleru river near Sagameswara temple in east side and in west side mosque. And in the centre of Koilakuntla, the south side is having Sidheswara temple and in north side mosque. That is why they are called as union of two religions of Hindu and Muslim. In 1847 Narasimha Reddy fought against the British and he was hanged to death by the British emperor near taluka office in Koilakuntla. In 1870 Buda Vengal Reddy helped poor people, native of Uyyalawada thaluka near Koilakuntla, so, Queen Victoria gave swarna Kanakam to him. This happened in the year 1850–1870.

== Demographics ==
Koilakuntla has a total population of 36,105 peoples. There are about 5,810 houses in Koilakuntla town. Nandyal is nearest big town to Koilakuntla which is approximately 39 km away. Until 2008 Koilakuntla was headquarter of Koilakuntla Assembly Constituency, in 2008 by the delimination order by Central government new Constituency formed with Banaganapalle

Governance
Department	Incharge
Legislative	Banaganapalle MLA, Koilakuntla Sarpanch
Executive	Dhone RDO, Koilakuntla MRO
Judiciary	Hon'ble Koilakuntla Court Judge
Police Sub Division	Allagadda DSP
Health	CHNC Koilakuntla
APSPDCL Division	Nandyal DE
APSRTC Bus Service	Koilakuntla Depot
Transport	Nandyal RTO
Pincode	518134

== Transport ==
The Andhra Pradesh State Road Transport Corporation operates bus services from Koilakuntla bus station with Koilakuntla Bus depot.

=== Distance to Major towns and cities ===
1. Kurnool = 100 km
2. Nandyal = 38 km
3. Allagadda = 30 km
4. Adoni = 145 km
5. Banaganapalle = 14 km
6. Bethamcherla =36
7. Dhone = 63 km
8. Jammalamadugu = 48 km
9. Proddutur = 68 km
10. Kadapa = 125 km
11. Tirupati = 265 km
12. Hyderabad = 305 km
13. Bengaluru = 330 km
14. Vijayawada = 360 km
15. Chennai = 375 km
16. TADIPATRI = 70 Km

== Railways ==
Koilkuntla Railway Station is opened in 2016 as part of Nandyal - Yerraguntla Railway line. Now the line is fully electrified. The station have 3 platforms and currently running trains are:

1. Dharmavaram-Machilipatnam express
2. Guntur–Tirupati Express
3. Nandyala-Renigunta Demu
4. Machilipatnam-Dharmavaram express
5. Tirupati-Guntur express
6. Renigunta-Nandyala Demu

== Airways ==
Uyyalawada Narasimha Reddy Domestic Airport which is located in Orvakal-Kurnool is the nearest which is 70 km from Koilkuntla.

Tirupati International Airport-Tirupati Which is 252 km away

Rajiv Gandhi International Airport- Hyderabad which is 285 km away

== Places of Interest ==
1. Yaganti- 30 km
2. Ahobilam- 50 km
3. Belum Caves- 40 km
4. Mahanandi- 52 km
5. Nandavaram- 22 km
6. Nayanalappa- 29 km

== Temples ==
1. Sri Panduranga Vitaleswara Swami Temple
2. Sri Vasavi Kanyakaparameswari Temple
3. Shiridi Sai Temple
4. Sri Shivalayam Temple
5. Sri Astalakshmi Venkateswara Swami Temple
6. Sri Chowdeswari Devi Temple
7. Sri Kapileswara swami Temple
8. Sri Nagalingeswara swami Temple
9. Sri Ayyappa Swami temple
10. Sri Ramalalayam
11. Sri Patimeedi Anjaneya Swami temple
12. Sri Satyanarayana Swami temple
13. Sri Saraswati Devi Temple
14. Sri Nagulakatta
15. Pedda baraimama peerla Chavidi
16. Noor havali Darga
17. Bijinavemula Chiwdeswari Devi
18. Masjid
19. CSI church

== Regional Festivals ==
1. Sri Panduranga Swamy Rathoshavam (Bramhostawams)
2. Devi Sharannavaratrulu (Dasara)
3. Vinayaka Chaviti
4. Sankrathi Paruveta
5. Sri Ramanavami
6. Maha Sivaratri
7. Ugadi
8. Deepavali
9. Vaikunta Yekadasi
10. Sri Krishnastmi
11. Hanuman Jayanti
12. Ramzan
13. Gurupoornima
14. Mohharam
15. Christmas
