= Rudravaram, Nandyal district =

Village in Rudravaram mandal, Nadyal district, Andhra Pradesh, India

Rudravaram
- village
- Interactive map of Rudravaram
- Location in Andhra Pradesh, India
- Country: India
- State: Andhra Pradesh
- District: Nandyal

Languages
  - Official: Telugu
- Time zone: UTC+5:30 (IST)
- Postal code: 518594

Rudravaram is a village in Rudravaram mandal of Nandyal district of Andhra Pradesh, India.

The village was plundered in July 1846 by an armed group led by Uyyalawada Narasimha Reddy.
