= Uyyalawada =

- Village
- Interactive map of Uyyalawada
- Location in Andhra Pradesh, India
- Coordinates: 15.102°N 78.396°E
- Country: India
- State: Andhra Pradesh
- District: Nandyal
- Elevation: 216 m (709 ft)

Population
  - Total: 4,199 (2,011)

Languages
  - Official: Telugu
- Time zone: UTC+5:30 (IST)
- Postal code: 518155
- Vehicle registration: AP-21

Uyyalawada is a village in Uyyalawada mandal, located in Nandyal district of the Indian state of Andhra Pradesh.

== Geography ==
Uyyalawada is located at 15.102°N 78.396°E. It is situated on the bank of the River Kundu, which starts in the village and is a tributary of the Penna River. It has an average elevation of 216 m (709 ft).

== Demographics ==
As per 2011 census, Uyyalawada village has population of 4199 of which 2123 are males while 2076 are females. There are 1042 households in the village.
