= Permanent Settlement =

Agreement between the East India Company and landlords of Bengal

The Permanent Settlement, also known as the Permanent Settlement of Bengal, was an agreement between the East India Company and landlords of Bengal to fix revenues to be raised from land. It had far-reaching consequences for both agricultural methods and productivity in the entire British Empire and the political realities of the Indian countryside. It was concluded in 1793 by the Company administration headed by Charles, Earl Cornwallis. It formed one part of a larger body of legislation that later came to be called the Cornwallis Code. The Cornwallis Code of 1793 divided the East India Company's service personnel into three branches: revenue, judicial, and commercial. Revenues were collected by zamindars, native Indians who were treated as landowners. This division created an Indian landed class that supported British authority.

The Permanent Settlement was introduced first in Bengal and Bihar and later in Varanasi and also the northern districts of Madras. The system eventually spread all over northern India by a series of regulations dated 1 May 1793. These regulations remained in place until the Charter Act 1833, that both restructured how British India was to be governed as well as extended the East India Company's current charter by 2 decades. The other two systems prevalent in India were the Ryotwari System and the Mahalwari System.

Many argue that the settlement and its outcome had several shortcomings when compared with its initial goals of increasing tax revenue, creating a Western-European style land market in Bengal, and encouraging investment in land and agriculture, thereby creating the conditions for long-term economic growth for both the company and region's inhabitants. Firstly, the policy of fixing the rate of expected tax revenue for the foreseeable future meant that the income of the company from taxation actually decreased in the long-term because revenues remained fixed while expenses increased over time. Meanwhile, the condition of the Bengali peasantry became increasingly pitiable, with famines becoming a regular occurrence as landlords (who risked immediate loss of their land if they failed to deliver the expected amount from taxation) sought to guarantee revenue by coercing the local agriculturalists to cultivate cash crops such as cotton, indigo, and jute, while long-term private investment by the zamindars in agricultural infrastructure failed to materialise. Under this system, Zamindars were granted ownership of land and tasked with collecting taxes from cultivators, but a key obligation was to provide land deeds (pattas) to the farmers, which was often neglected due to the absence of regulatory supervision over the Zamindars’ conduct.

== Background ==
Earlier zamindars in Bengal, Bihar and Odisha had been functionaries who held the right to collect revenue on behalf of the Mughal emperor and his representative, the diwan, in Bengal. The diwan supervised the zamindars to ensure they were neither lax nor overly stringent. When the East India Company was awarded the diwani or overlordship of Bengal by the empire following the Battle of Buxar in 1764, it found itself short of trained administrators, especially those familiar with local custom and law. As a result, landholders were unsupervised or reported to corrupt and indolent officials. The result was that revenues were extracted without regard for future income or local welfare.

Following the devastating famine of 1770, which was partially caused by this shortsightedness, Company officials in Calcutta better understood the importance of oversight of revenue officials. Warren Hastings, then governor-general of Fort William in Bengal, introduced a system of five-yearly inspections and temporary tax farmers. They did not want to take direct control of local administration in villages for several reasons, one being that the Company did not want to upset those who had traditionally enjoyed power and prestige in rural Bengal.

The Company failed to consider the question of incentivisation. Many appointed tax farmers absconded with as much revenue as they could during the time period between inspections. The British Parliament took note of the disastrous consequences of the system, and in 1784, British Prime Minister William Pitt the Younger directed the Calcutta administration to alter it immediately. In 1786 Charles Cornwallis was sent out to India to reform the company's practices.

In 1786, the East India Company Court of Directors first proposed a permanent settlement for Bengal, changing the policy then being followed by Calcutta, which was attempting to increase taxation of zamindars. Between 1786 and 1790, the new Governor-General Lord Cornwallis and Sir John Shore (later Governor-General) entered a heated debate over whether or not to introduce a permanent settlement with the zamindars. Shore argued that the native zamindars would not trust the permanent settlement to be permanent and that it would take time before they realised it was genuine.

The main aim of the Permanent Settlement was to resolve the problem of agrarian crisis and distress that had resulted in lower agricultural output. The British officials thought that investment in agriculture, trade, and the resources of the revenue of the state could be increased by agriculture. To permanently fix the revenue and secure property rights, the system which came to be known as the 'Permanent Settlement' was adopted. The British thought that once the revenue demands of the state were permanently set, there would be a regular flow of tax income. Furthermore, landholders would invest in their agricultural land as the producer can keep surpluses in excess of the fixed tax. The British officials thought that such a process would lead to the emergence of yeomen class of farmers and rich landowners who would invest their capital to generate further surpluses. This new emergent class would be loyal to the British. The policy failed to identify individuals who were willing to contract to pay fixed revenue perpetually and to invest in the improvement of agriculture. After much discussion and disagreement between the officials, the Permanent Settlement was made with the existing rajas and taluqdars of Bengal who were now classified as zamindars. They had to pay fixed revenue in perpetuity. Thus, zamindars were not the landowners but rather revenue collector agents of the state. Cornwallis believed that they would immediately accept it and so begin investing in improving their land. In 1790, the Court of Directors issued a ten-year (decennial) settlement to the zamindars, which was made permanent in 1793.

By the Permanent Settlement Act of 1793, their right to keep armed forces was removed. They remained just the tax collectors of the land. There were considerably weakened as they were now banned from holding any court, as it was brought under the supervision of a collector appointed by the company. British officials believed that investing in the land would improve the economy. People also killed some British officials.

In 1819, the Governor-general of India, Francis Rawdon-Hastings, observed that "[the Permanent Settlement,] fashioned with great care and deliberation has....subjected almost the whole of the lower classes throughout these provinces to most grievous oppression." In 1829, Lord Bentinck, however, noted that the scheme did succeed in one important respect, saying, "If, however, security was wanting against extensive popular tumult or revolution, I should say that the Permanent Settlement....has this great advantage at least, of having created a vast body of rich landed proprietors deeply interested in the continuance of the British Dominion and having complete command over the mass of the people."

== Overview ==
The question of incentivisation now being understood to be central, the security of tenure of landlords was guaranteed. In short, the former landholders and revenue intermediaries were granted proprietorial rights (effective ownership) to the land they held. Smallholders were no longer permitted to sell their land, but they could not be expropriated by their new landlords.

Incentivisation of zamindars was intended to encourage improvements of the land, such as drainage, irrigation and the construction of roads and bridges; such infrastructure had been insufficient through much of Bengal. With a fixed land tax, zamindars could securely invest in increasing their income without any fear of having the increase taxed away by the company. Cornwallis made the motivation quite clear by declaring that "when the demand of government is fixed, an opportunity is afforded to the landholder of increasing his profits, by the improvement of his lands". The British had in mind "improving landlords" in their own country, such as Coke of Norfolk.

The Court of Directors also hoped to guarantee the company's income, which was constantly plagued by defaulting zamindars who fell into arrears, making it impossible for them to budget their spending accurately.

The immediate consequence of the Permanent Settlement was both very sudden and dramatic, one that nobody had apparently foreseen. By ensuring that zamindars' lands were held in perpetuity and with a fixed tax burden, they became desirable commodities. In addition, the government tax demand was inflexible, and the British East India Company's collectors refused to make allowances for times of drought, flood or other natural disaster. The tax demand was higher than that in England at the time. As a result, many zamindars immediately fell into arrears.

The company's policy of auction of any zamindari lands deemed to be in arrears created a market for land that previously did not exist. Many of the new purchasers of this land were Indian officials within the East India Company's government. The bureaucrats were ideally placed to purchase lands which they knew to be underassessed and therefore profitable. In addition, their position as officials gave them opportunity to acquire the wealth necessary to purchase land. They could also manipulate the system to bring to sale land that they specifically wanted.

Historian Bernard S. Cohn and others have argued that the Permanent Settlement led to a commercialisation of land that previously did not exist in Bengal and, as a consequence, it led to a change in the social background of the ruling class from "lineages and local chiefs" to "under civil servants and their descendants, and to merchants and bankers". The new landlords were different in their outlook; "often they were absentee landlords who managed their land through managers and who had little attachment to their land".

== Influence ==
The Company hoped that the Zamindar class would not only be a revenue-generating instrument but also serve as intermediaries for the more political aspects of their rule, preserving local custom and protecting rural life from the possibly rapacious influences of its own representatives. However, it worked both ways, as zamindars became a naturally conservative interest group. Once British policy in the mid-19th century changed to one of reform and intervention in custom, the zamindars were vocal in their opposition. The Permanent Settlement had the features that state demand was fixed at 89% of the rent and 11% was to be retained by the zamindar. The state demand could not be increased but payment should be made on the due date, before sunset, so it was also known as the 'Sunset Law'. Failure to pay led to the sale of land to the highest bidder.

While the worst of the tax-farming excesses were countered by the introduction of the Settlement, the use of land was not part of the agreement. There was a tendency of Company officials and Indian landlords to force their tenants into plantation-style farming of cash crops like indigo and cotton rather than rice and wheat. That was a cause of many of the worst famines of the nineteenth century.

Once the salient features of the Permanent Settlement were reproduced all over India, and indeed elsewhere in the Empire, including Kenya, the political structure was altered forever. The landlord class held much greater power than they had under the Mughals, who subjected them to oversight by a trained bureaucracy with the power to attenuate their tenure. The power of the landlord caste/class over smallholders was not diluted in India until the first efforts towards land reform in the 1950s, still incomplete everywhere except West Bengal.

In Pakistan, where land reform was never carried out, elections in rural areas still suffer from a tendency towards oligarchy, reflecting the concentration of influence in the hands of zamindar families. The contest with India over Kashmir skewed the central leadership and the relationship between the elected and non-elected institutions of the state.
