= Portrait of Lord Cornwallis =

Painting by Thomas Gainsborough

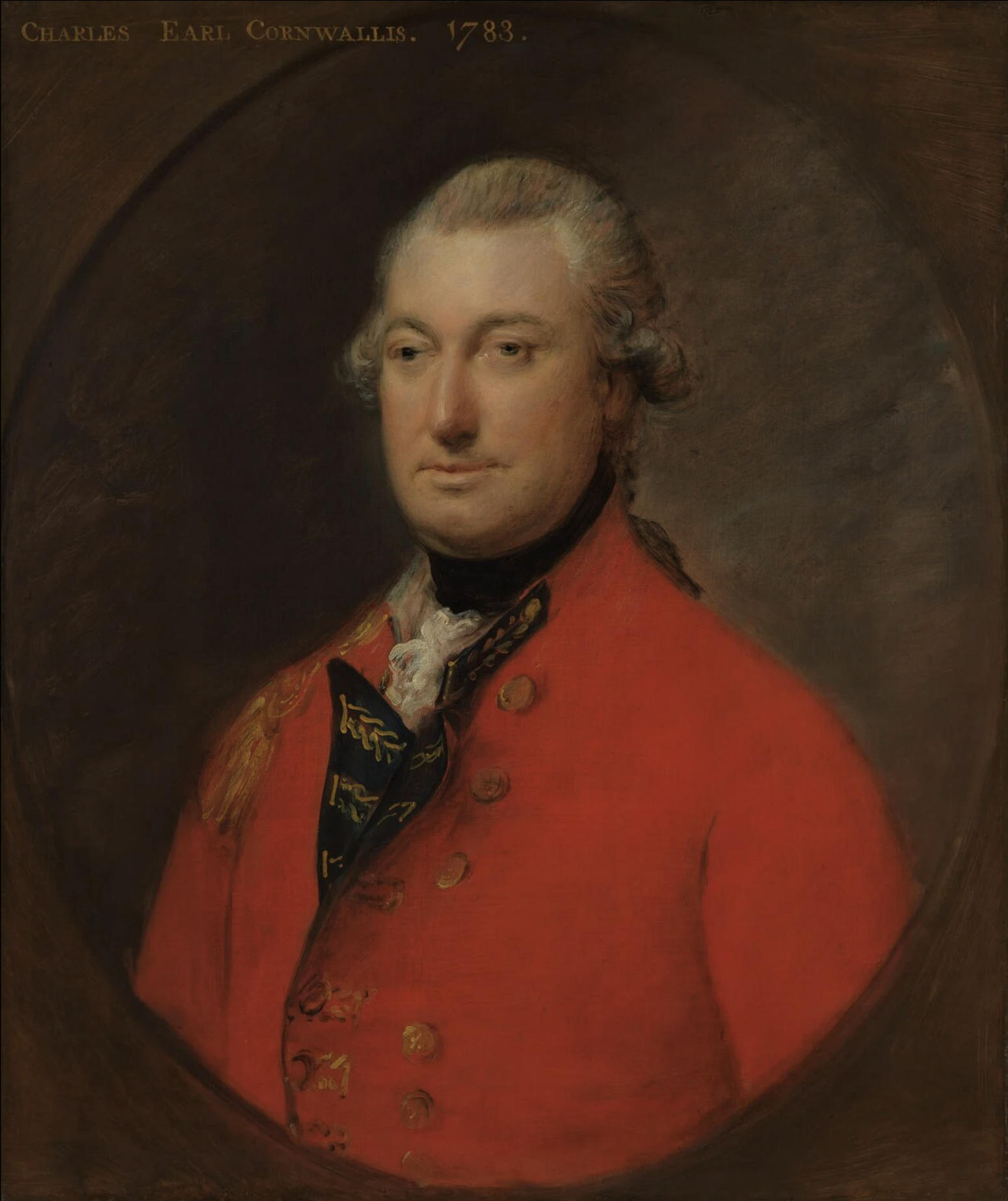
- Artist: Thomas Gainsborough
- Year: 1783
- Type: Oil on canvas, portrait
- Dimensions: 76 cm × 63.1 cm (30 in × 24.8 in)
- Location: National Portrait Gallery, London

Portrait of Lord Cornwallis is an oil on canvas portrait painting by the English artist Thomas Gainsborough, from 1783. it shows the British general Charles, Earl Cornwallis. It is held in the National Portrait Gallery in London.

== History and description ==
Cornwallis had recently served in the American War of Independence where he commanded British and Loyalist American forces during the Southern Campaign. Trapped by the French fleet of Comte de Grasse following the Battle of the Chesapeake and hemmed in by the Franco-American Army under Rochambeau and George Washington he was forced on 19 October 1781 to surrender during the Siege of Yorktown, unable to be rescued in time by his superior Clinton, coming from New York. While the surrender has not marked the end of the war, it let directly to the downfall of the government of Lord North.

He is depicted the same year that the Peace of Paris was ratified, ending the war. Cornwallis career was revived by the government of William Pitt and he served for a further two decades, notably in India and Ireland. In 1802 he negotiated and signed the Treaty of Amiens with France, bringing a temporary halt to the Napoleonic Wars, portrayed in the later painting The Peace of Amiens by Jules-Claude Ziegler.

Cornwallis sat on his return to London after Yorktown. At the same time another veteran of the American War, the Irish general Lord Rawdon, was also being painted by Gainsborough. The portrait of Cornwallis was displayed at the Royal Academy's Summer Exhibition in 1783. It was considered a "good likeness" of the general. A version commissioned by the Princes of Wales soon afterwards is now in the Royal Collection.

== Bibliography ==
- Carptenter, Stanley D.M. Southern Gambit: Cornwallis and the British March to Yorktown. University of Oklahoma Press, 2019.
- Hamilton, James. Gainsborough: A Portrait. Hachette UK, 2017.
- Janson, H.W.. Paris Salon de 1853. Garland Publishing, 1977.
- Middleton, Richard. Cornwallis: Soldier and Statesman in a Revolutionary World. Yale University Press, 2022.
