= List of railway lines in India =

This article lists conventional railway lines of India. For urban railway lines, see Urban rail transit in India, for high-speed railway lines and speed classification, see List of high-speed railway lines in India.

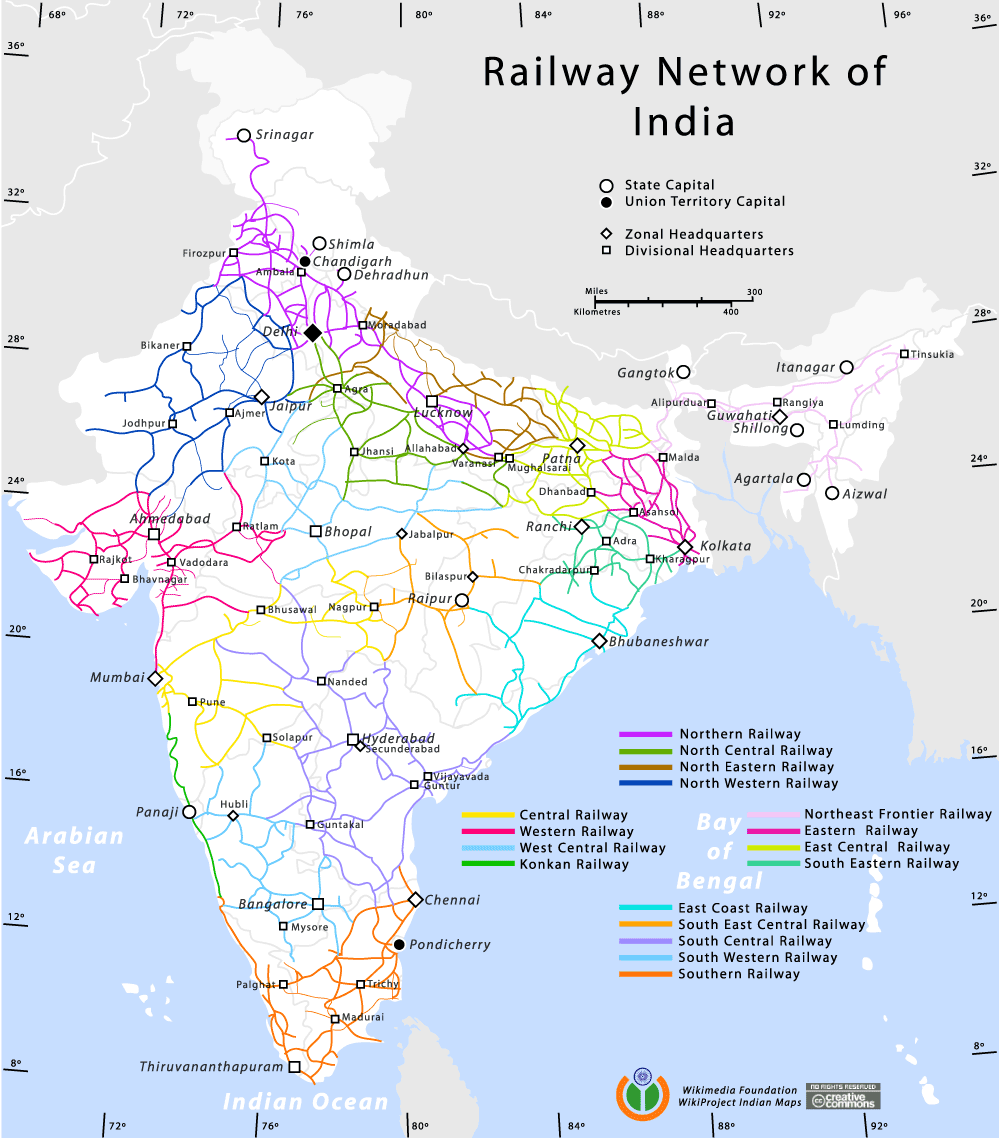
Railway Network of India

== Legend ==
Lines

† Converted from narrow or meter gauges
‡ Under construction or under upgradation

Speed

Group B lines: up to 130 km/h (81 mph)
Group A lines: up to 160 km/h (99 mph)

Note
- While this article may not list all railway lines of India, the most significant ones which have a dedicated Wikipedia article are listed here.
- The article's regional sections are divided according to India's zonal councils.
- The lines that fall in both regions are placed in the section of the region which has majority of the line lying within it.
- All lines listed in the regional sections are of broad gauge (1,676 mm).
- The main lines that are formed by combination of multiple lines are listed in a section of their own.

== Main lines ==
The following major trunk lines that connect major Indian cities are formed by combination of multiple smaller lines.

Line	Operator(s)	Opened	Length	Speed	Electrified	Ref.
Howrah–Chennai	South Eastern, East Coast, South Coast and Southern Railway	1901	1,661 km (1,032 mi)	160 km/h (99 mph)	2005	
Howrah–Mumbai	South Eastern, South East Central and Central Railway	1890	1,968 km (1,223 mi)	130 km/h (81 mph)	2012	
Howrah–New Delhi	Eastern, East Central, North Central and Northern Railway	1866	1,532 km (952 mi)	130 km/h (81 mph)	2002	
Mumbai–Chennai	Central, South Central, South Coast and Southern Railway	1871	1,281 km (796 mi)	130 km/h (81 mph)	2015	
New Delhi–Chennai	Northern, North Central, Central, South Central, South Coast and Southern Railway	1929	2,182 km (1,356 mi)	160 km/h (99 mph)	1991	
New Delhi–Mumbai	Northern, North Central, West Central and Western Railway		1,386 km (861 mi)	130 km/h (81 mph)	1987	

== Northern region ==
The Northern zonal council of India includes states and Union terrirtories of Jammu and Kashmir, Ladakh, Punjab, Delhi, Chandigarh, Himachal Pradesh and Rajasthan.

Line	Operator(s)	Opened	Length	Speed	Electrified	Ref.
Ambala–Attari	Northern Railway	1873	273 km (170 mi)	130 km/h (81 mph)	2004	
Amritsar–Pathankot	Northern Railway	1884	108 km (67 mi)	110 km/h (68 mph)	2018	
Amritsar–Khem Karan	Northern Railway	1910	126 km (78 mi)	100 km/h (62 mph)	2019	
Bathinda–Rajpura	Northern Railway		173 km (107 mi)	110 km/h (68 mph)	2019	
Bathinda–Rewari	Northern Railway	1884	300 km (190 mi)	110 km/h (68 mph)	2009	
Bathinda–Rohtak †	Northern Railway	1884	228 km (142 mi)	110 km/h (68 mph)	2009	
Bhanupli–Leh ‡	Northern Railway	2030	489 km (304 mi)		Under construction	
Bikaner–Rewari †	North Western Railway	1941	379 km (235 mi)	110 km/h (68 mph)	2020	
Chandigarh–Sahnewal	Northern Railway	2013	97 km (60 mi)	110 km/h (68 mph)	2015	
Delhi–Kalka †	Northern Railway	1891	267 km (166 mi)	130 km/h (81 mph)	2000	
Delhi–Fazilka	Northern Railway	1897	416 km (258 mi)	110 km/h (68 mph)	2019	
Delhi–Jaipur †	Northern and North Western Railway	1875	305 km (190 mi)	110 km/h (68 mph)	Yes	
Delhi–Moradabad †	Northern Railway	1900	167 km (104 mi)	110 km/h (68 mph)	2019	
Haryana Orbital ‡	Northern Railway	2026	121.7 km (75.6 mi)	160 km/h (99 mph)	Under construction	
Jaipur–Ahmedabad †	North Western and Western Railway	1881	630 km (390 mi)	130 km/h (81 mph)	2014	
Jalandhar–Firozpur	Northern Railway	1912	118 km (73 mi)	110 km/h (68 mph)	2019	
Jammu–Baramulla ‡	Northern Railway	2024	338 km (210 mi)		Partly opened	
Jodhpur–Bathinda †	North Western Railway	1902	118 km (73 mi)	110 km/h (68 mph)	Yes	
Jodhpur–Jaisalmer †	North Western Railway	1968	292 km (181 mi)	100 km/h (62 mph)	Yes	
Ludhiana–Jakhal	Northern Railway	1901	129 km (80 mi)	110 km/h (68 mph)	2020	
Marwar–Munabao †	North Western Railway	1902	370 km (230 mi)	100 km/h (62 mph)	Yes	
Merta Road–Rewari †	North Western Railway	1941	368 km (229 mi)	100 km/h (62 mph)	2018	
Rewari–Rohtak	Northern Railway	2013	81.3 km (50.5 mi)	100 km/h (62 mph)	Yes	
Shri Ganganagar–Sadulpur †	North Western Railway	1930	244 km (152 mi)	110 km/h (68 mph)	2021	
Suratgarh–Bathinda †	Northern and North Western Railway	1970	264 km (164 mi)	100 km/h (62 mph)	Yes	

== Eastern region ==
The Eastern zonal council of India includes states of Bihar, Jharkhand, Odisha and West Bengal.

Line	Operator(s)	Opened	Length	Speed	Electrified	Ref.
Ahmadpur–Katwa †	Eastern Railway	1917	52 km (32 mi)	110 km/h (68 mph)	Yes	
Alipurduar–Bamanhat †	Northeast Frontier Railway	1894	74 km (46 mi)	100 km/h (62 mph)	Yes	
Andal–Sainthia	Eastern Railway	1913	73 km (45 mi)	100 km/h (62 mph)	2016	
Andal–Sitarampur	Eastern Railway	1864	73 km (45 mi)	100 km/h (62 mph)	2017	
Asansol–Patna	South Eastern Railway	1871	331 km (206 mi)	130 km/h (81 mph)	2001	
Asansol–Tatanagar–Kharagpur	Eastern and East Central Railway	1891	205 km (127 mi)	130 km/h (81 mph)	1963	
Asansol–Gaya	Eastern and East Central Railway	1907	267 km (166 mi)	130 km/h (81 mph)	1962	
Bakhtiyarpur–Tilaiya †	East Central Railway	1903	100 km (62 mi)	100 km/h (62 mph)	2017	
Bandel–Katwa	Eastern Railway	1913	104 km (65 mi)	100 km/h (62 mph)	1996	
Bankura–Masagram †	South Eastern Railway	2005	120.3 km (74.8 mi)	100 km/h (62 mph)	2021	
Barauni–Guwahati	East Central and Northeast Frontier Railway	1950	784 km (487 mi)	110 km/h (68 mph)	2021	
Barauni–Katihar †	East Central and Northeast Frontier Railway	1889	185 km (115 mi)	110 km/h (68 mph)	2012	
Barauni–Gorakhpur †	East Central and North Eastern Railway	1907	202 km (126 mi)	110 km/h (68 mph)	Yes	
Barauni–Raxaul †	East Central and North Eastern Railway	1907	210 km (130 mi)	100 km/h (62 mph)	Yes	
Bardhaman–Asansol	Eastern Railway	1863	106 km (66 mi)	130 km/h (81 mph)	1966	
Bardhaman–Katwa †	Eastern Railway	1915	53 km (33 mi)	110 km/h (68 mph)	2018	
Barharwa–Azimganj–Katwa †	Eastern Railway	1913	170 km (110 mi)	110 km/h (68 mph)	2021	
Barkakana–Muri–Chandil	South Eastern Railway	1937	126 km (78 mi)	110 km/h (68 mph)	1997	
Barkakana–Netaji S.C.Bose Gomoh	East Central Railway	1902	105 km (65 mi)	130 km/h (81 mph)	1998	
Barkakana–Son Nagar	East Central Railway	1907	313 km (194 mi)	110 km/h (68 mph)	1962	
Barsoi–New Farakka	Eastern and Northeast Frontier Railway	1963	126 km (78 mi)	110 km/h (68 mph)	Yes	
Cuttack–Sambalpur	East Coast Railway	1998	284 km (176 mi)	100 km/h (62 mph)	2010	
Dhanbad–Chandrapura	Eastern and South Eastern Railway	1894	34 km (21 mi)	80 km/h (50 mph)	1987	
Dumka–Bhagalpur	Eastern Railway	1907	115 km (71 mi)	110 km/h (68 mph)	Yes	
Eklakhi–Balurghat	Northeast Frontier Railway	2004	87 km (54 mi)	110 km/h (68 mph)	2023	
Fatuha–Tilaiya †	East Central Railway	2003	170 km (110 mi)	55 km/h (34 mph)	2020	
Gaya–Kiul	East Central Railway	1979	129 km (80 mi)	100 km/h (62 mph)	2018	
Gaya–Pt. D.D. Upadhyaya Junction	East Central Railway	1907	197 km (122 mi)	130 km/h (81 mph)	1962	
Hajipur–Muzaffarpur–Samastipur–Barauni	East Central Railway	1907	157.37 km (97.79 mi)	110 km/h (68 mph)	Yes	
Haldibari–New Jalpaiguri †	East Central Railway	1878	157.37 km (97.79 mi)	110 km/h (68 mph)	2024	
Harnaut–Mokama	East Central Railway	2016	52 km (32 mi)	110 km/h (68 mph)	Yes	
Barkakana–Muri–Chandil	South Eastern Railway	1965	165 km (103 mi)	110 km/h (68 mph)	2002	
Howrah–Barddhaman	Eastern Railway	1854	108 km (67 mi)	130 km/h (81 mph)	1958	
Howrah–Barddhaman	Eastern Railway	1917	95 km (59 mi)	130 km/h (81 mph)	1966	
Howrah–Kharagpur	South Eastern Railway	1900	115 km (71 mi)	130 km/h (81 mph)	1969	
Jasidih–Dumka–Rampurhat	Eastern Railway	2011	135 km (84 mi)	90 km/h (56 mph)	Yes	
Jharsuguda–Vizianagaram	East Coast Railway	1961	448 km (278 mi)	130 km/h (81 mph)	2018	
Katihar–Siliguri †	Northeast Frontier Railway	1958	203.7 km (126.6 mi)	110 km/h (68 mph)	Yes	
Kharagpur–Bankura–Adra	South Eastern Railway	1901	168 km (104 mi)	110 km/h (68 mph)	1999	
Kharagpur–Bankura–Adra	East Coast and South Eastern Railway	1901	407 km (253 mi)	130 km/h (81 mph)	2002	
Khurda Road–Bolangir ‡	East Coast Railway	TBD	306.25 km (190.29 mi)	130 km/h (81 mph)	Under construction	
Koderma–Ranchi	South Eastern and East Central Railway	2015	211 km (131 mi)	100 km/h (62 mph)	Yes	
Lanjigarh–Junagarh	East Coast Railway	2014	56 km (35 mi)	100 km/h (62 mph)	Yes	
Madhupur–Giridih–Koderma	Eastern and East Central Railway	1871	138 km (86 mi)	110 km/h (68 mph)	2020	
Mokama–Barauni	East Central Railway	1959	21 km (13 mi)	110 km/h (68 mph)	Yes	
Muzaffarpur–Hajipur	EastCentral Railway	1886	53.83 km (33.45 mi)	110 km/h (68 mph)	2014	
Muzaffarpur–Sitamarhi	EastCentral Railway	2013	53.83 km (33.45 mi)	80 km/h (50 mph)	Yes	
Nalhati–Azimganj †	Eastern Railway	1863	45 km (28 mi)	80 km/h (50 mph)	2021	
Narkatiaganj–Bhikhna Thori †	East Central Railway		36 km (22 mi)		Yes	
Neora–Sheikhpura ‡	East Central Railway	TBD	123.2 km (76.6 mi)	80 km/h (50 mph)	Under construction	
Netaji S.C.Bose Gomoh–Hatia	East Central and South Eastern Railway	1961	152 km (94 mi)	110 km/h (68 mph)	1958	
New Jalpaiguri–New Mal–Samuktala Road †	Northeast Frontier Railway	1950	182 km (113 mi)	110 km/h (68 mph)	Yes	
New Jalpaiguri–New Bongaigaon	Northeast Frontier Railway	1963	252 km (157 mi)	110 km/h (68 mph)	2024	
New Mal–Changrabandha–New Cooch Behar	Northeast Frontier Railway	2016	128.6 km (79.9 mi)	110 km/h (68 mph)	2024	
Patna–Gaya	Eastern Railway	1900	92 km (57 mi)	75 km/h (47 mph)	2003	
Patna–Mughalsarai	Eastern Railway	1862	212 km (132 mi)	130 km/h (81 mph)	2002	
Patna–Hajipur	Eastern Railway	2016	21 km (13 mi)	50 km/h (31 mph)	2016	
Ranaghat–Lalgola †	Eastern Railway	1899	155 km (96 mi)	110 km/h (68 mph)	2007	
Samastipur–Muzaffarpur	East Central Railway	1886	53 km (33 mi)	110 km/h (68 mph)	2014	
Sealdah–Gede	Eastern Railway	1862	117 km (73 mi)	110 km/h (68 mph)	1964	
Sealdah–Bangaon	Eastern Railway	1882	117 km (73 mi)	100 km/h (62 mph)	1964	
Sheoraphuli–Bishnupur	Eastern Railway	1885	39 km (24 mi)	100 km/h (62 mph)	1957	
Tatanagar–Bilaspur	South East Central, South Eastern and East Coast Railway	1892	468 km (291 mi)	130 km/h (81 mph)	1970	

== Northeastern region ==
The Northeastern Zonal council of India includes states of Arunachal Pradesh, Assam, Manipur, Meghalaya, Mizoram, Nagaland, Sikkim and Tripura.

Line	Operator(s)	Opened	Length	Speed	Electrified	Ref.
Guwahati–Lumding †	Northeast Frontier Railway	1900	181 km (112 mi)	110 km/h (68 mph)	Yes	
Lumding–Dibrugarh †	Northeast Frontier Railway	1903	376 km (234 mi)	100 km/h (62 mph)	Under construction	
Lumding–Sabroom †	Northeast Frontier Railway	2008	503 km (313 mi)	100 km/h (62 mph)	Under construction	
New Bongaigaon–Guwahati	Northeast Frontier Railway	1962	170 km (110 mi)	110 km/h (68 mph)	2014	
Rangiya–Murkongselek †	Northeast Frontier Railway	1895	450 km (280 mi)	110 km/h (68 mph)	Yes	
Sivok–Rangpo ‡	Northeast Frontier Railway	TBD	44 km (27 mi)	TBD	Under construction	

== Central region ==
The Central zonal council of India includes states and Union terrirtories of Uttarakhand, Uttar Pradesh, Madhya Pradesh and Chhattisgarh.

Line	Operator(s)	Opened	Length	Speed	Electrified	Ref.
Agra–Bhopal	North Central and West Central Railway	1889	508 km (316 mi)	160 km/h (99 mph)	1989	
Aunrihar–Jaunpur	North Eastern Railway	1904	60 km (37 mi)	110 km/h (68 mph)	2019	
Bhopal–Nagpur	West Central and Central Railway	1924	390 km (240 mi)	130 km/h (81 mph)	1991	
Bilaspur–Nagpur †	South East Central Railway	1891	414 km (257 mi)	130 km/h (81 mph)	2018	
Bilaspur–Katni	South East Central Railway and Western Railway	1891	318.6 km (198.0 mi)	130 km/h (81 mph)	1995	
Bina–Katni	South East Central Railway and Western Railway	1923	262 km (163 mi)	100 km/h (62 mph)	1991	
Prayagraj–Jabalpur	North Central and West Central Railway	1867	366 km (227 mi)	130 km/h (81 mph)	Yes	
Prayagraj–Mau–Gorakhpur	North Central and West Central Railway	1930	356 km (221 mi)	110 km/h (68 mph)	Yes	
Delhi–Meerut–Saharanpur	Northern Railway	1870	181 km (112 mi)	100 km/h (62 mph)	2016	
Indore–Gwalior	Western, West Central and North Central Railway	1899	516 km (321 mi)	130 km/h (81 mph)	Yes	
Jabalpur–Bhusaval	North Central and West Central Railway	1870	551 km (342 mi)	130 km/h (81 mph)	1992	
Kothavalasa–Kirandul	South Coast and East Coast Railway	1966	445 km (277 mi)	100 km/h (62 mph)	1982	
Laksar–Dehradun	Northern Railway	1900	79 km (49 mi)	100 km/h (62 mph)	2016	
Lucknow–Gorakhpur	Northern and North Eastern Railway	1885	277 km (172 mi)	110 km/h (68 mph)	Yes	
Lucknow–Moradabad	Northern Railway	1873	326 km (203 mi)	100 km/h (62 mph)	2013	
Mainpuri–Etawah	North Central Railway	2016	55.16 km (34.27 mi)	100 km/h (62 mph)	2019	
Mau–Dildarnagar ‡	North Eastern and East Central Railway	TBD	66 km (41 mi)		Under construction	
Moradabad–Ambala	Northern Railway	1886	274 km (170 mi)	110 km/h (68 mph)	2006	
Pdt. D.D. Upadhyaya–Kanpur	North Central Railway	1866	346 km (215 mi)	130 km/h (81 mph)	2013	
Muzaffarpur–Gorakhpur	EastCentral Railway	1930	309.7 km (192.4 mi)	110 km/h (68 mph)	Yes	
Moradabad–Ambala	Western Railway	1896	56 km (35 mi)	110 km/h (68 mph)	1991	
Ujjain–Bhopal	Western and West Central Railway	1895	183 km (114 mi)	110 km/h (68 mph)	1992	
Varanasi–Chhapra †	North Eastern Railway	1909	206 km (128 mi)	100 km/h (62 mph)	2018	
Varanasi–Lucknow	Northern and North Central Railway	1872	324 km (201 mi)	110 km/h (68 mph)	2022	
Varanasi–Rae Bareli–Lucknow	Northern Railway	1898	301 km (187 mi)	110 km/h (68 mph)	Yes	
Varanasi–Sultanpur–Lucknow	Northern Railway	1872	301 km (187 mi)	110 km/h (68 mph)	2013	

== Western region ==
The Western Indian zonal council includes states of Goa, Gujarat and Maharashtra

Line	Operator(s)	Opened	Length	Speed	Electrified	Ref.
Ahmedabad–Viramgam	Western Railway	1871	65 km (40 mi)	100 km/h (62 mph)	Yes	
Ahmedabad–Mumbai	Western Railway	1863	493 km (306 mi)	160 km/h (99 mph)	Yes	
Ahmedabad–Udaipur †	Western and North Western Railway	1879	296 km (184 mi)	80 km/h (50 mph)	Yes	
Anand–Godhra	Western Railway	1874	79 km (49 mi)		Yes	
Anand–Khambhat	Western Railway	1890	79 km (49 mi)		Yes	
Ankleshwar–Rajpipla †	Western Railway	1897	67 km (42 mi)		No	
Bharuch–Dahej †	Western Railway	1914	62 km (39 mi)	100 km/h (62 mph)	Yes	
Bhusawal–Kalyan	Central and Western Railway	1865	390 km (240 mi)	130 km/h (81 mph)	1969	
Chalisgaon–Dhule	Central Railway	1900	56 km (35 mi)	44 km/h (27 mph)	2020	
Chhota Udaipur–Dhar ‡	Western Railway	TBD	157 km (98 mi)	80 km/h (50 mph)	Under construction	
Dadar–Solapur	Central Railway	1860	446 km (277 mi)	130 km/h (81 mph)	2022	
Gandhidham–Ahmedabad	Central Railway	1969	299.2 km (185.9 mi)	100 km/h (62 mph)	Yes	
Gandhidham–Bhuj	Central Railway	1969	59 km (37 mi)	100 km/h (62 mph)	Yes	
Gandhidham–Kandla Port	Western Railway	1930	11 km (6.8 mi)	100 km/h (62 mph)	Yes	
Gandhidham–Palanpur †	Western Railway	1952	301 km (187 mi)	100 km/h (62 mph)	Yes	
Jamnagar–Porbandar †	Western Railway	1946	44 km (27 mi)	80 km/h (50 mph)	Yes	
Kanjari Boriyavi–Vadtal	Western Railway	1929	6 km (3.7 mi)	80 km/h (50 mph)	No	
Latur–Miraj †	Central Railway	1897	341.94 km (212.47 mi)	100 km/h (62 mph)	Yes	
Maliya Miyana–Wankaner †	Central Railway	1890	80 km (50 mi)		Yes	
Nagpur–Bhusawal †	Central Railway	1867	389 km (242 mi)	130 km/h (81 mph)	1991	
Nagpur–Secunderabad	Central and South Central Railway	1929	581 km (361 mi)	130 km/h (81 mph)	1995	
Narkhed–Badnera	Central Railway	2012	138 km (86 mi)	100 km/h (62 mph)	2017	
Palitana–Sihor †	Western Railway	1910	27.62 km (17.16 mi)		2022	
Porbandar–Jetalsar †	Western Railway	1890	124 km (77 mi)		2022	
Pune–Londa †	Central and South Western Railway	1890	468 km (291 mi)	100 km/h (62 mph)	2024	
Rajkot–Somnath †	Western Railway	1890	190 km (120 mi)	80 km (50 mi)	Yes	
Rajkot–Wankaner †	Western Railway	1890	42 km (26 mi)	80 km (50 mi)	Yes	
Samakhiali–Maliya Miyana	Western Railway	1969	39 km (24 mi)	80 km (50 mi)	Yes	
Secunderabad–Manmad	South Central & Central Railway	1905	621 km (386 mi)	100 km/h (62 mph)	Yes	
Surendranagar–Bhavnagar †	Western Railway	1880	170 km (110 mi)	100 km (62 mi)	Yes	
Taranga Hill–Abu Road ‡	Western Railway	TBD	116.65 km (72.48 mi)		Under construction	
Udhna–Jalgaon	Western & Central Railway		307 km (191 mi)	110 km (68 mi)	Yes	
Vasad–Kathana	Western Railway	1953	43 km (27 mi)		No	
Viramgam–Mahesana †	Western Railway		65 km (40 mi)		Yes	
Viramgam–Maliya Miyana	Western Railway	1942	142 km (88 mi)		Yes	
Viramgam–Okha †	Western Railway	1922	433 km (269 mi)	100 km (62 mi)	Yes	
Viramgam–Surendra Nagar	Western Railway	1872	65 km (40 mi)	100 km (62 mi)	Yes	
Wankaner–Surendra Nagar	Western Railway	1890	74 km (46 mi)		Yes	
Wardha–Nanded ‡	Central Railway	TBD	284 km (176 mi)		Under construction	

== Southern region ==
The Southern Indian zonal council includes states of Andhra Pradesh, Karnataka, Kerala, Telangana and Tamil Nadu

Line	Operator(s)	Opened	Length	Speed	Electrified	Ref.
Bangalore–Arsikere–Hubli	South Western Railway	1887	469 km (291 mi)	110 km/h (68 mph)	Yes	
Bhimavaram–Narasapur	South Coast Railway		30 km (19 mi)	110 km/h (68 mph)	Yes	
Chennai Central–Bangalore City	Southern and South Western Railway	1864	358 km (222 mi)	130 km/h (81 mph)	1992	
Chennai Egmore–Thanjavur †	Southern Railway	1880	351 km (218 mi)	110 km/h (68 mph)	2010	
Coimbatore–Pollachi †	Southern Railway	1915	40 km (25 mi)	100 km/h (62 mph)	2010	
Coimbatore–Mettupalayam †	Southern Railway	1873	36 km (22 mi)	110 km/h (68 mph)	2015	
Dharmavaram–Pakala †	South Central Railway	1891	227.40 km (141.30 mi)	100 km/h (62 mph)	2010	
Duvvada–Vijayawada	South Coast Railway	1897	350 km (220 mi)	130 km/h (81 mph)	1965	
Ernakulam–Kayamkulam	Southern Railway	1989	102 km (63 mi)	100 km/h (62 mph)	Yes	
Ernakulam–Kottayam–Kayamkulam †	Southern Railway	1956	118 km (73 mi)	100 km/h (62 mph)	Yes	
Erode–Tiruchirappalli †	Southern Railway	1929	118 km (73 mi)	110 km/h (68 mph)	2018	
Gudivada–Machilipatnam	South Coast Railway		36.70 km (22.80 mi)	110 km/h (68 mph)	Yes	
Gudur–Renigunta	South Coast Railway	1957	83 km (52 mi)	110 km/h (68 mph)	Yes	
Gudur–Chennai	South Coast and Southern Railway	1899	455 km (283 mi)	130 km/h (81 mph)	Yes	
Renigunta–Katpadi	South Coast Railway		115 km (71 mi)	110 km/h (68 mph)	2017	
Guntakal–Vasco da Gama †	South Coast and South Western Railway	1882	457 km (284 mi)	110 km/h (68 mph)	Yes	
Guntakal–Bangalore †	South Coast and South Western Railway	1892	293 km (182 mi)	110 km/h (68 mph)	Yes	
Guntur–Krishna Canal	South Coast Railway	1966	25.36 km (15.76 mi)	110 km/h (68 mph)	2017	
Guntur–Tenali	South Coast Railway	1916	25.47 km (15.83 mi)	110 km/h (68 mph)	2019	
Guruvayur–Thrissur	Southern Railway	1994	23 km (14 mi)	90 km/h (56 mph)	Yes	
Hassan–Bangalore	South Western Railway	2017	179 km (111 mi)	110 km/h (68 mph)	Yes	
Jolarpettai–Shoranur	Southern and South Western Railway	1861	418 km (260 mi)	110 km/h (68 mph)	Yes	
Kadapa–Bangalore ‡	South Coast and South Western Railway	TBD	257 km (160 mi)	100 km/h (62 mph)	Under construction	
Kazipet–Vijayawada	South Central and South Coast Railway	1889	201.14 km (124.98 mi)	130 km/h (81 mph)	1988	
Khurda Road–Visakhapatnam	East Coast Railway	1899	424 km (263 mi)	130 km/h (81 mph)	1988	
Kollam–Sengottai †	Southern Railway	1904	94.1 km (58.5 mi)	100 km/h (62 mph)	Yes	
Kollam–Thiruvananthapuram †	Southern Railway	1918	94.1 km (58.5 mi)	100 km/h (62 mph)	2006	
Kothapalli–Manoharabad ‡	South Central Railway	2026	151 km (94 mi)	100 km/h (62 mph)	Under construction	
Madurai–Tirunelveli †	Southern Railway	1876	157.1 km (97.6 mi)	100 km/h (62 mph)	2015	
Mahabubnagar–Munirabad ‡	Southern Railway	2025	274 km (170 mi)	100 km/h (62 mph)	Under construction	
Manamadurai–Virudhunagar †	Southern Railway	1964	67 km (42 mi)	80 km/h (50 mph)	Under construction	
Mangalore–Mysore †	South Western and Southern Railway	1979	309 km (192 mi)	80 km/h (50 mph)	Under construction	
Medak–Akkannapet	South Central Railway	2022	17.2 km (10.7 mi)	80 km/h (50 mph)	No	
Motumarri–Vishnupuram	South Central Railway	2019	89 km (55 mi)	75 km/h (47 mph)	2019	
Mysore–Bangalore †	South Western Railway	1882	138.25 km (85.90 mi)	110 km/h (68 mph)	2018	
Mysore–Chamarajanagar †	South Western Railway	2008	61 km (38 mi)	90 km/h (56 mph)	Yes	
Nadikudi–Macherla	South Coast Railway		35 km (22 mi)	90 km/h (56 mph)	Yes	
Nadikudi–Srikalahasti ‡	South Coast Railway	TBD	308 km (191 mi)	110 km/h (68 mph)	Under construction	
Nagercoil–Tirunelveli	Southern Railway	1981	73 km (45 mi)	100 km/h (62 mph)	2018	
Nallapadu–Nandyal †	South Central and South Coast Railway	1892	256.9 km (159.6 mi)	110 km/h (68 mph)	Yes	
Nandyal–Yerraguntla	South Coast Railway	2016	123 km (76 mi)	110 km/h (68 mph)	Yes	
Nilambur–Shoranur	Southern Railway	1927	66 km (41 mi)	100 km/h (62 mph)	Yes	
Obulavaripalle–Krishnapatnam	South Coast Railway	2019	112 km (70 mi)	100 km/h (62 mph)	2019	
Pagidipalli–Nallapadu	South Central Railway	1930	238.49 km (148.19 mi)	110 km/h (68 mph)	2017	
Palakkad–Pollachi †	Southern Railway	1898	58 km (36 mi)	55 km/h (34 mph)	Yes	
Peddapalli–Nizamabad	South Central Railway	1993	177 km (110 mi)	100 km/h (62 mph)	2022	
Rayadurg–Tumkur ‡	South Western Railway	TBD	207 km (129 mi)	100 km/h (62 mph)	Under construction	
Secunderabad–Dhone †	South Central and South Coast Railway	1929	295 km (183 mi)		2023	
Shoranur–Cochin Harbour †	Southern Railway	1902	107 km (66 mi)	90 km/h (56 mph)	1996	
Shoranur–Mangalore	Southern Railway	1902	328 km (204 mi)	110 km/h (68 mph)	2014	
Solapur–Guntakal †	Central, South Central and Southern Railway	1871	379 km (235 mi)	130 km/h (81 mph)	2021	
Tenali–Repalle	South Coast Railway	1916	32.10 km (19.95 mi)	90 km/h (56 mph)	2021	
Thiruvananthapuram–Kanyakumari	Southern Railway	1979	86 km (53 mi)	100 km/h (62 mph)	Yes	
Tirunelveli–Tiruchendur †	Southern Railway	1923	60 km (37 mi)	110 km/h (68 mph)	2023	
Vijayawada–Nidadavolu	South Coast Railway		127 km (79 mi)	130 km/h (81 mph)	Yes	
Vijayawada–Gudur †	South Coast and Southern Railway	1899	127 km (79 mi)	130 km/h (81 mph)	1980	

== International ==
Line	Operator(s)	Opened	Length	Speed	Electrified	Ref.
Bangladesh
Akhaura–Agartala	(India) Northeast Frontier Railway (Bangladesh) East Zone	2023	15 km (9.3 mi)	80 km/h (50 mph)	No	
Old Malda–Abdulpur	(India) Northeast Frontier Railway (Bangladesh) West Zone	1930	154 km (96 mi)	90 km/h (56 mph)	No	
Nepal
Jaynagar–Bardibas	(India) East Central Railway (Nepal) NRCL	1937	68.7 km (42.7 mi)	120 km/h (75 mph)	No	

== Meter and narrow gauge lines ==
Line	Gauge	Operator(s)	Opened	Length	Speed	Electrified	Ref.
Darjeeling Himalayan Railway	Narrow (610 mm)	Northeast Frontier Railway	1881	83.9 km (52.1 mi)	10 km/h (6.2 mph)	No	
Kalka–Shimla Railway	Narrow (762 mm)	Northern Railway	1903	96.60 km (60.02 mi)	30 km/h (19 mph)	No	
Kangra Valley Railway	Narrow (762 mm)	Northern Railway	1928	164 km (102 mi)	40 km/h (25 mph)	No	
Matheran Hill Railway	Narrow (610 mm)	Central Railway	1907	21 km (13 mi)		No	
Nilgiri Mountain Railway	Meter (1000 mm)	Southern Railway	1908	46 km (29 mi)		No	

== See also ==
- List of railway stations in India
- Dedicated freight corridors in India
- High-speed rail in India
