= Bathinda–Rohtak line =

Bathinda-Rohtak railway line

Bathinda–Rohtak line with links to Delhi

Overview
- Status: Operational
- Owner: Indian Railways
- Locale: Haryana, Punjab
- Termini: Bathinda Junction; Rohtak

Service
- Operator(s): Northern Railway

Technical
- Track length: Main line: 228 km (142 mi)
- Track gauge: 1,676 mm (5 ft 6 in) broad gauge
- Electrification: Fully electrified
- Highest elevation: Bathinda 208 m (682 ft)

The Bathinda–Rohtak line is a railway line connecting Bathinda Junction in the Indian state of the Punjab and Rohtak Junction in Haryana.The line is under the administrative jurisdiction of Northern Railway.

== Stations between Bathina to Rohtak ==
- Samar Gopalpur railway station
- Karainthi railway station
- Lakhan Majra railway station
- Kila Zafargarh railway station
- Julana railway station
- Jai Jai Wanti railway station
- Kinana railway station
- Bishanpura Haryana railway station
- Jind railway station
- Barsola railway station
- Gaon Baroda railway station
- Uchana railway station
- Ghaso railway station
- Narwana Junction railway station
- Dharodi railway station
- Dhamtan Sahib railway station
- Kalwan railway station
- Tohana railway station
- Himmatpura railway station
- Jakhal Junction railway station
- Gurnay railway station
- Lehra Gaga railway station
- Govindgarh Khokhar railway station
- Chhajli railway station
- Sunam Udham Singh Wala railway station
- Bharur railway station
- Sangrur railway station
- Bahadur Singh Wala railway station
- Dhuri Junction railway station
- Rajomajra railway station
- Alal railway station
- Sekha railway station
- Barnala railway station
- Hadiyaya railway station
- Ghunas railway station
- Tapa railway station
- Jethuke railway station
- Rampura Phul railway station
- Lehra Muhabbat railway station
- Laihra Khana railway station
- Bhuchchu railway station
- Bathinda Cantt. Outer Cabin railway station
- Bathinda Cantt. railway station
- Bathinda Junction railway station

== Gauge conversion and electrification ==
The Bathinda–Rohtak metre-gauge line was converted to 1,676 mm (5 ft 6 in)-wide broad gauge in 1994.
