= Tirumala Express =

Train in India

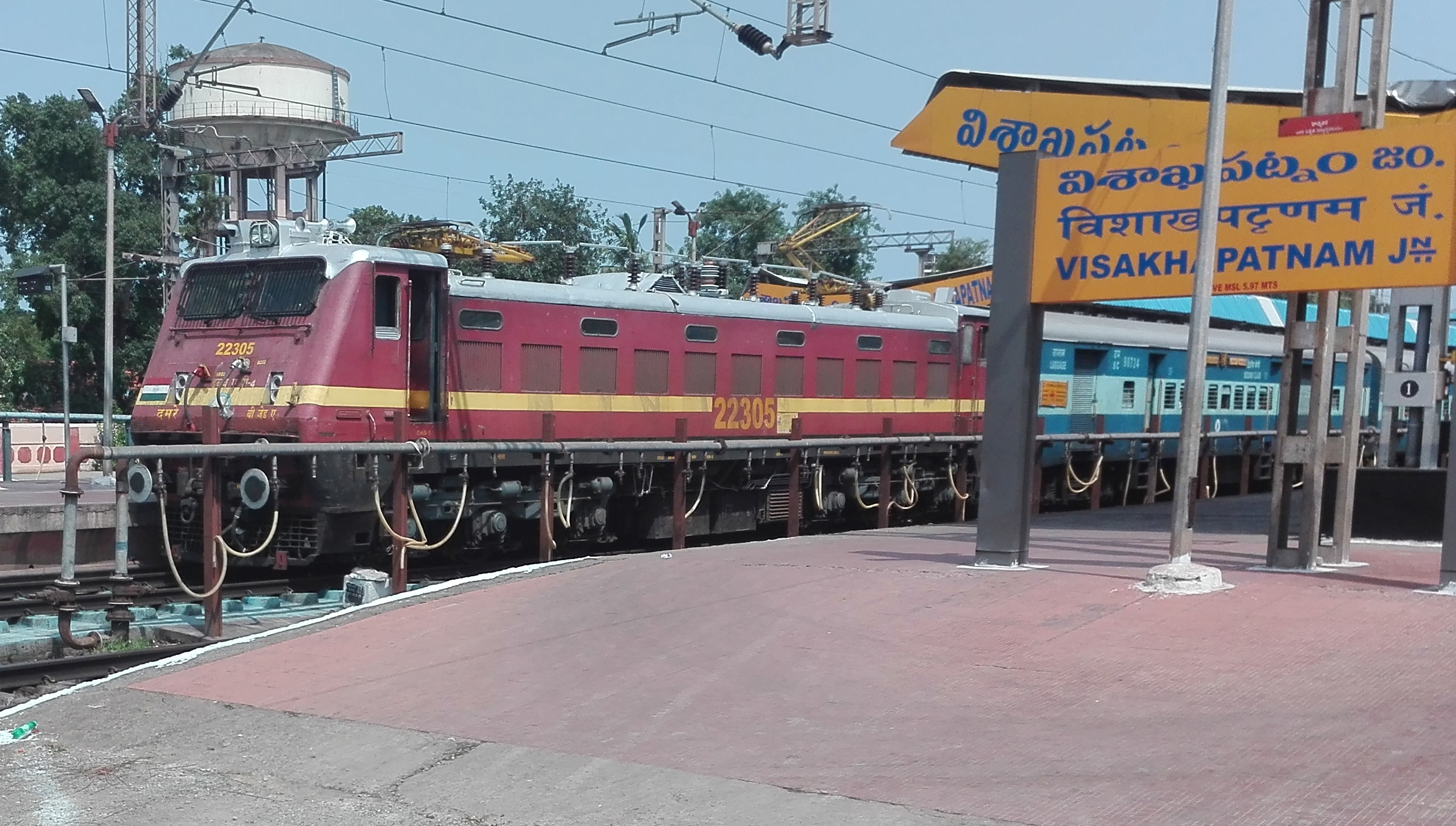
- 18521 Kadapa bound Tirumala Express at Visakhapatnam.

Overview
- Service type: Mail/Express
- Locale: Andhra Pradesh
- First service: 5 April 1970; 56 years ago
- Current operator: South Coast Railway

Route
- Termini: Guntakal (GTL); Visakhapatnam (VSKP)
- Stops: 40
- Distance travelled: 1,060 km (659 mi)
- Average journey time: 22 hours 00 minutes
- Service frequency: Daily
- Train number: 18521 / 18522

On-board services
- Classes: AC first class, AC 2 tier, AC 3 tier, Sleeper class, General Unreserved
- Seating arrangements: Yes
- Sleeping arrangements: Yes
- Catering facilities: On-board catering, E-catering
- Observation facilities: Large windows
- Baggage facilities: Available
- Other facilities: Below the seats

Technical
- Rolling stock: LHB coach
- Track gauge: Broad Gauge
- Operating speed: 49 km/h (30 mph) average including halts.
Route map
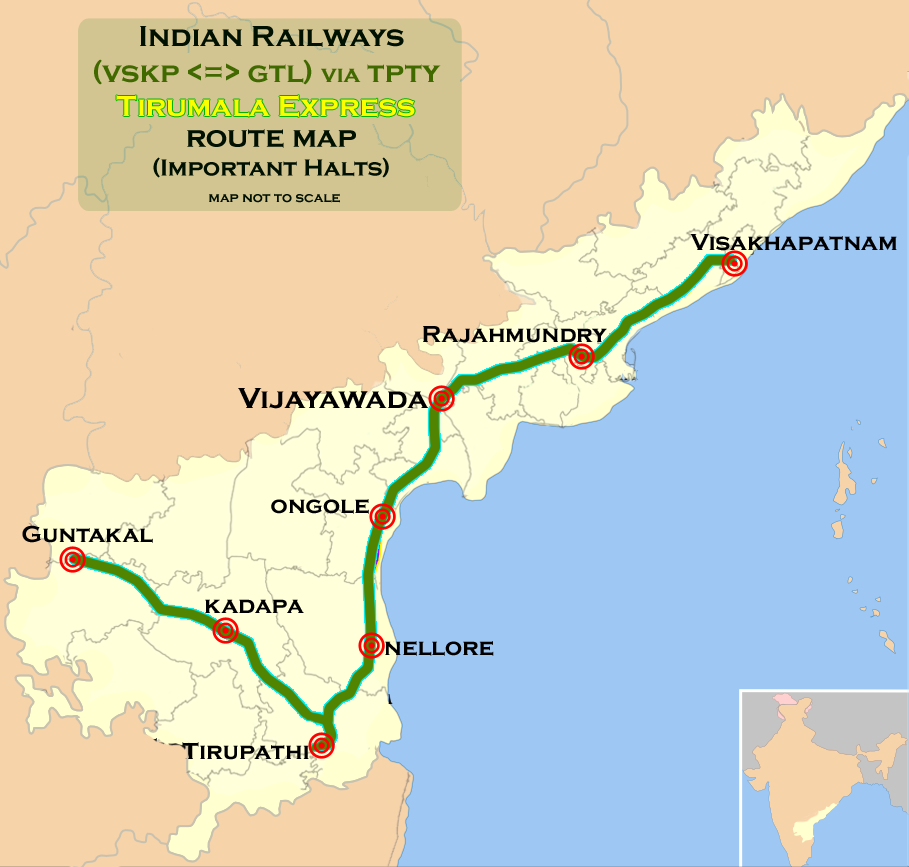
- Tirumala Express Route map (click the map to view)

The 18521 / 18522 Visakhapatnam–Guntakal Tirumala Express is a train that shuttles between Visakhapatnam and Guntakal. Previously the train used to run between Visakhapatnam and Tirupati and has been extended to Kadapa from 31 January 2019.Later, the service was further extended from Kadapa to Guntakal from 12 May 2026, improving connectivity for passengers from Rayalaseema and north coastal Andhra Pradesh.

== History ==
The Tirumala Express was introduced on 5 April 1970, originally operating between Visakhapatnam and Tirupati. The train was named after Tirumala, the famous pilgrimage centre near Tirupati, and was introduced to provide a direct rail connection between the Visakhapatnam region and Tirupati.

In 2019, the service was extended beyond Tirupati to Kadapa, with the extended service commencing on 31 January 2019. This extension provided direct connectivity between the coastal Andhra region, Tirupati and the Rayalaseema region.

In February 2021, the Tirumala Express was converted from conventional ICF coaches to modern LHB coaches, replacing its older rolling stock.

From 1 July 2024, the train numbers were changed from 17487/17488 to 18521/18522 as part of Indian Railways renumbering changes.

In May 2026, the service was further extended towards Guntakal Junction, expanding its connectivity across Andhra Pradesh.

The train has consequently evolved from a Visakhapatnam–Tirupati service introduced in 1970 into a longer-distance service connecting Guntakal, Kadapa, Tirupati and Visakhapatnam.

== Service ==
Train no.18522 starts from Guntakal at 13:30 PM and reaches Visakhapatnam at 11:30 AM the next day. 18521/18522 runs daily from both the sides via Tirupati Main.

Train number	Station code	Departure station	Departure time	Arrival station	Arrival time
18522	GTL	Guntakal	1:30 PM	Visakhapatnam	11:30 AM
18521	VSKP	Visakhapatnam	2:00 PM	Guntakal	11:30 AM

The new numbers for this train were revised from 1 July 2024. Earlier train numbers were (17488/17487 for Visakhapatnam-Kadapa-Visakhapatnam train Tirumala Express.

== Coach composition ==
In February 2021, it has replaced into LHB coach and the arrangement;

- 6 Sleeper class
- 6 AC III tier
- 2 AC II tier
- 1 AC I tier
- 1 AC Economy
- 4 General unreserved
- 1 SLR
- 1 EoG

== Route and halts ==
- Visakhapatnam
- Duvvada
- Anakapalle
- Elamanchili
- Narsipatnam Road
- Tuni
- Annavaram
- Pithapuram
- Samalkot
- Anaparthi
- Dwarapudi
- Rajahmundry
- Kovvur
- Nidadavolu Junction
- Tadepalligudem
- Bhimadolu
- Eluru
- Nuzvid
- Vijayawada Junction
- Tenali
- Nidubrolu
- Bapatla
- Chirala
- Ongole
- Kavali
- Nellore
- Gudur
- Venkatagiri
- Srikalahasti
- Renigunta
- Tirupati Main
- Koduru
- Rajampet
- Nandalur
- Kadapa
- Yerraguntla
- Kondapuram
- Tadipatri
- Gooty
- Guntakal

== Traction ==
It is hauled by a Lallaguda Loco Shed-based WAP-7 or WAP-4 electric locomotive on its entire journey.

== Rake Sharing ==
The train shares its rake with 18517/18518 Korba-Visakhapatnam Express.
