= Yellakaru railway station =

Railway station in Andhra Pradesh

Yellakaru

General information
- Location: Kalavalapudi, Tirupati district, Andhra Pradesh; India
- Coordinates: 13.84646°N 79.650572°E
- Elevation: 72 metres (236 ft)
- System: Indian Railways station
- Owner: Indian Railways
- Operator: Indian Railways
- Line: Gudur–Katpadi branch line
- Platforms: 1
- Tracks: broad gauge

Construction
- Structure type: Standard (on ground)

Other information
- Status: Functioning
- Station code: YLK
- Zone(s): SCR
- Division(s): Guntakal

Services
Preceding station	Indian Railways	Following station
Venkatagiri towards ?	South Coast Railway zone Gudur–Katpadi branch line	Srikalahasti towards ?
Location
- Interactive map

Yellakaru railway station is a railway station located on the Gudur–Katpadi railway line operated by the South Coast Railway zone under Guntakal railway division. It is situated at Kalavalapudi in Tirupati district in the Indian state of Andhra Pradesh.
