= Venkatagiri railway station =

Railway station in Andhra Pradesh, India

Venkatagiri
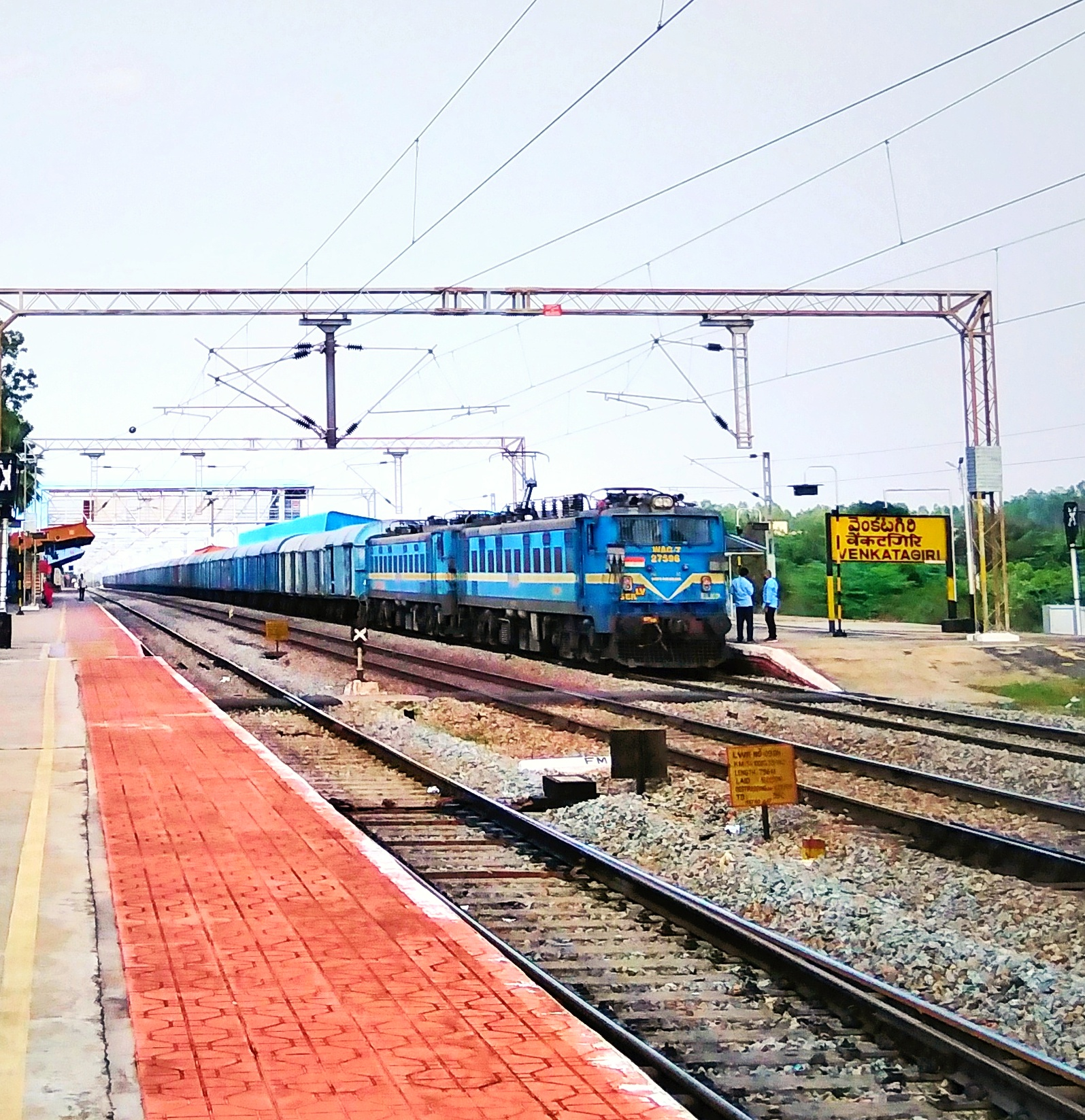
- Venkatagiri railway station

General information
- Location: Naidupeta Road, Venkatagiri, Tirupati district, Andhra Pradesh; India
- Coordinates: 13.9441°N 79.6041°E
- Operator: Indian Railways
- Line: Gudur–Katpadi branch line
- Platforms: 3 now
- Tracks: but more now more than three are developed

Construction
- Structure type: On ground
- Accessible: Disabled access

Other information
- Station code: VKI
- Zone(s): South Coast Railway zone
- Division(s): Guntakal

Services
Preceding station	Indian Railways	Following station
Nidigallu towards ?	Gudur–Renigunta section	Yellakaru towards ?
Location
- Location within Andhra Pradesh Location within India

Venkatagiri railway station (station code: VKI) is an Indian Railways station in Venkatagiri town of Andhra Pradesh. It lies on the Gudur–Katpadi branch line and is administered under Guntakal railway division of South Coast Railway zone.

== Classification ==
Venkatagiri railway station is classified as a D–category station in the Guntakal railway division.

Venkatagiri railway station connects the new Nadikudi–Srikalahasti section with Gudur–Katpadi branch line.
