= Vendodu railway station =

Railway station in Andhra Pradesh

Vendodu
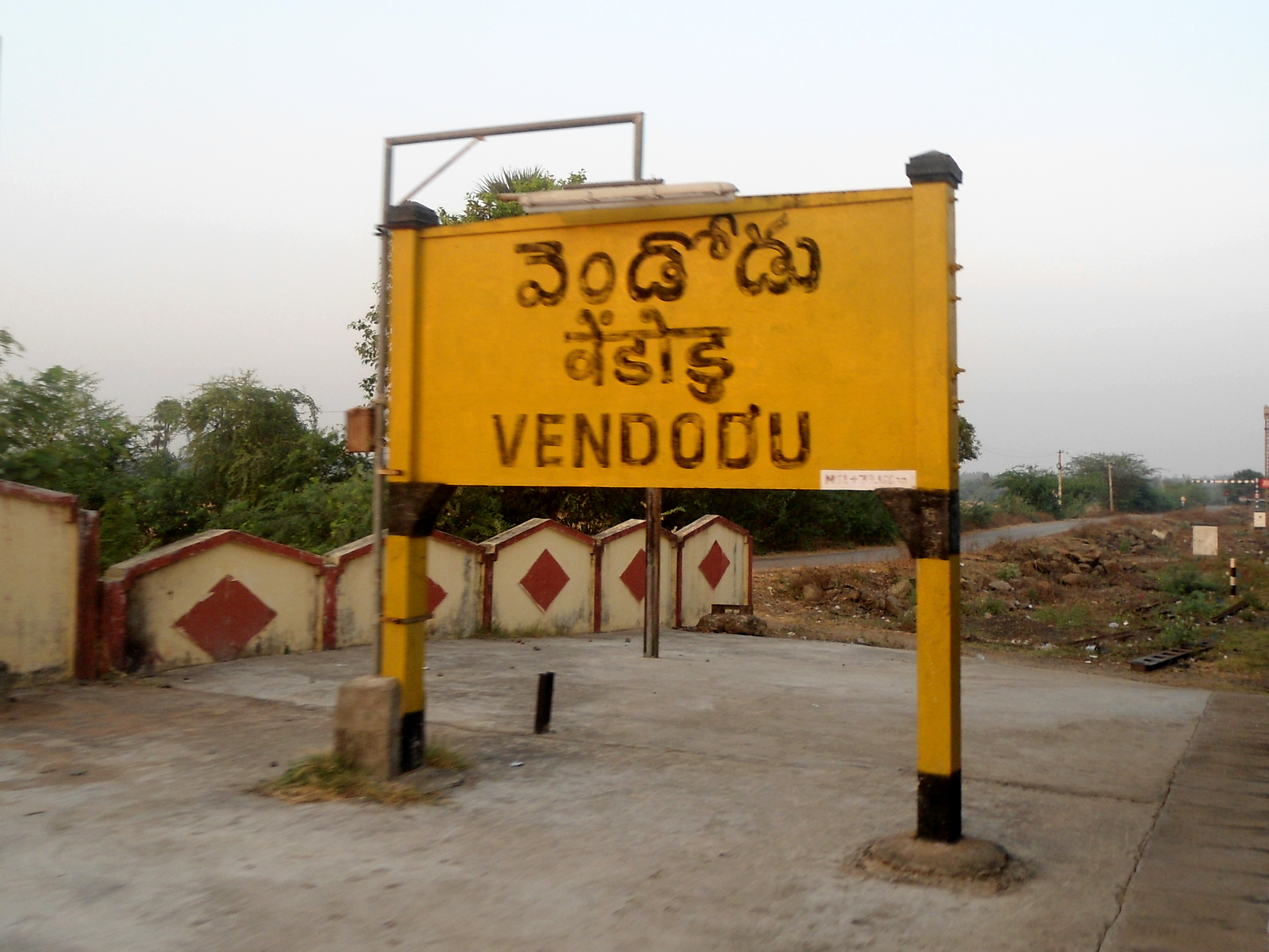
- Vendodu Railway Station

General information
- Location: Ozili Gollapalli Road, Jayampu, Nellore district, Andhra Pradesh; India
- Coordinates: 14.026947°N 79.7284°E
- Elevation: 44 metres (144 ft)
- System: Indian Railways station
- Owner: Indian Railways
- Operator: Indian Railways
- Line: Gudur–Katpadi branch line
- Platforms: 2
- Tracks: broad gauge

Construction
- Structure type: Standard (on ground)

Other information
- Status: Functioning
- Station code: VDD
- Zone(s): SCR
- Division(s): Guntakal

Services
| Preceding station | Indian Railways | Following station |
|---|---|---|
| Kondagunta towards ? | South Coast Railway zone Gudur–Katpadi branch line | Nidigallu towards ? |
Location
- Interactive map

Vendodu railway station is a railway station located on the Gudur–Katpadi railway line operated by the South Coast Railway zone under Guntakal railway division. It is situated beside Ozili Gollapalli Road at Jayampu in Nellore district in the Indian state of Andhra Pradesh.
