= Kondagunta railway station =

Railway station in Andhra Pradesh, India

Kondagunta

General information
- Location: Kondagunta, Gudur Tehsil, Nellore district, Andhra Pradesh; India
- Coordinates: 14.080028°N 79.79392°E
- Elevation: 53 metres (174 ft)
- System: Indian Railways station
- Owner: Indian Railways
- Operator: Indian Railways
- Line: Gudur–Katpadi branch line
- Platforms: 2
- Tracks: broad gauge

Construction
- Structure type: Standard (on ground)

Other information
- Status: Functioning
- Station code: KQA
- Zone(s): SCR
- Division(s): Guntakal

Services
Preceding station	Indian Railways	Following station
Gudur Junction towards ?	South Coast Railway zone Gudur–Katpadi branch line	Vendodu towards ?
Location
- Interactive map

Kondagunta railway station is a railway station located on the Gudur–Katpadi railway line operated by the South Coast Railway zone under Guntakal railway division. It is situated at Kondagunta, Gudur Tehsil in Nellore district in the Indian state of Andhra Pradesh.
