= Nidigallu railway station =

Railway station in Andhra Pradesh

Nidigallu

General information
- Location: Jayampu Road, Tikkavaram, Nellore district, Andhra Pradesh; India
- Coordinates: 13.988306°N 79.660594°E
- Elevation: 54 metres (177 ft)
- System: Indian Railways station
- Owner: Indian Railways
- Operator: Indian Railways
- Line: Gudur–Katpadi branch line
- Platforms: 2
- Tracks: broad gauge

Construction
- Structure type: Standard (on ground)

Other information
- Status: Functioning
- Station code: NDZ
- Zone(s): SCR
- Division(s): Guntakal

Services
Preceding station	Indian Railways	Following station
Vendodu towards ?	South Coast Railway zone Gudur–Katpadi branch line	Venkatagiri towards ?
Location
- Interactive map

Nidigallu railway station is a railway station located on the Gudur–Katpadi railway line operated by the South Coast Railway zone under Guntakal railway division. It is situated beside Jayampu Road at Tikkavaram in Nellore district in the Indian state of Andhra Pradesh.
