= Akhaura Junction railway station =

Railway Junction in Brahmanbaria, Bangladesh

Akhaura Junction আখাউড়া জংশন
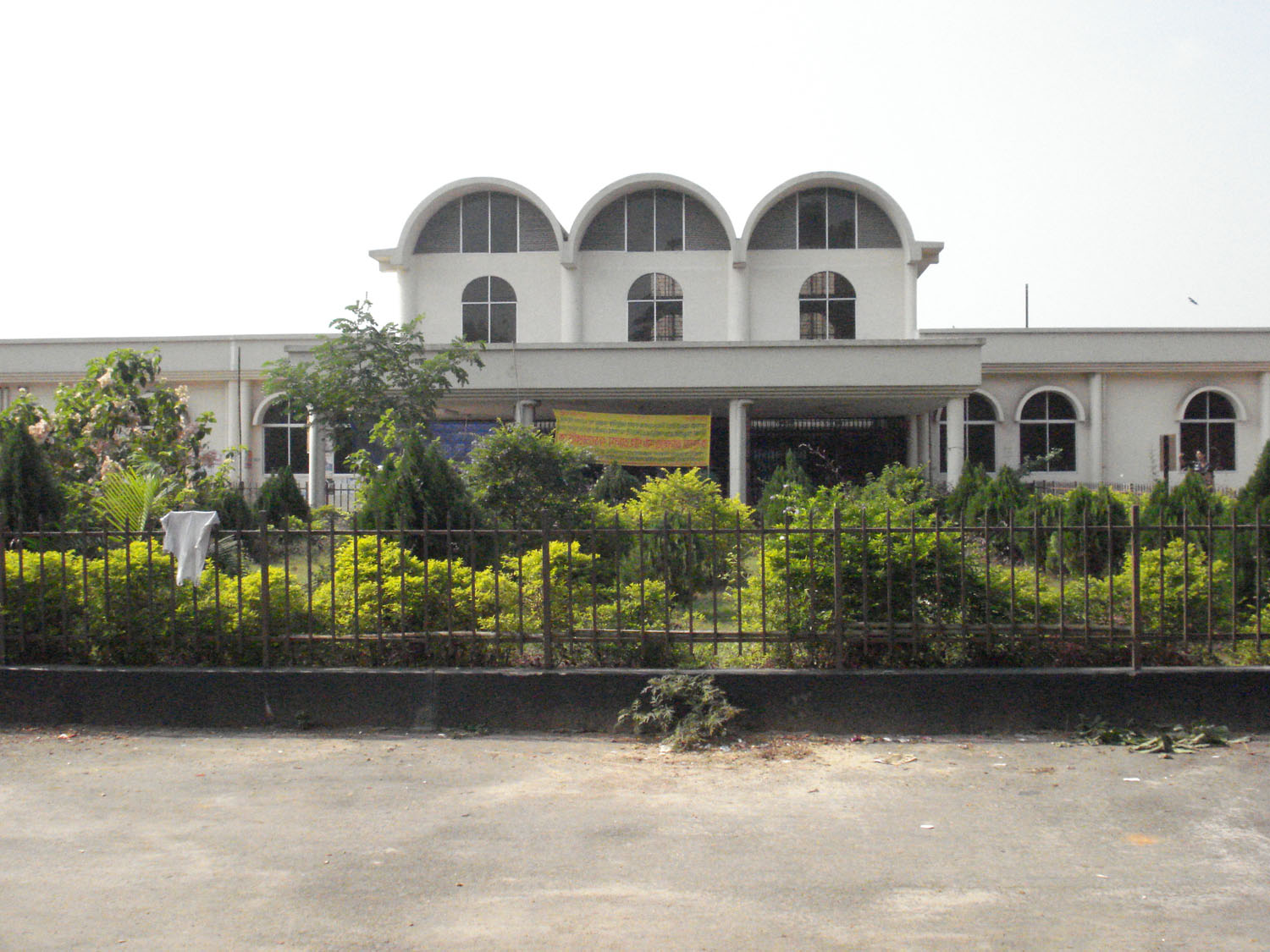

General information
- Location: Akhaura Upazila, Brahmanbaria District; Bangladesh
- Coordinates: 23.8690722°N 91.2056796°E
- System: Bangladesh Railway Station
- Lines: Akhaura–Kulaura–Chhatak line; Tongi–Bhairab–Akhaura line; Akhaura–Agartala line; Akhaura–Laksam–Chittagong line
- Tracks: Dual Gauge

Construction
- Structure type: Standard (on ground station)
- Parking: Yes
- Accessible: Yes
- Architectural style: Modern

Other information
- Status: Functioning
- Station code: AKA
- Zone(s): East Zone
- Division(s): Dhaka

History
- Opened: 1896

Services
Preceding station	Akhaura Junction railway station	Following station
Terminus	Line; Akhaura–Kulaura–Chhatak	Azampur
Bhatshala	Line; Tongi–Bhairab–Akhaura	Terminus
Terminus	Line; Akhaura–Laksam–Chittagong	Gangasagar
Terminus	Line; Akhaura–Agartala	Gangasagar
Location

Akhaura Junction railway station is a railway junction located in Akhaura Upazila, Brahmanbaria District, Chittagong Division, Bangladesh.

== History ==
In response to the demands of tea manufacturers of Assam for a railway line with the port of Chittagong, the Assam Bengal Railway started construction of railway lines in eastern Bengal from 1891. Chittagong–Comilla line was opened in 1895. On 1 July 1895, the 150 km Chittagong–Comilla and the 69 km Laksam–Chandpur lines were opened to the public. In 1896, Comilla–Akhaura–Shahbajpur line was established.

In the same year it was opened as a station of Comilla–Akhaura–Shahbajpur line. It became a junction station when the railway line from Akhaura to Tongi was built.
