= Krishnapatnam railway station =

Railway station in Andhra Pradesh, India

Krishnapatnam

General information
- Location: Krishnapatnam, Nellore district, Andhra Pradesh; India
- Coordinates: 14°15′35″N 80°03′23″E
- System: Goods station
- Owner: Indian Railways
- Operator: Indian Railways
- Line: Obulavaripalle–Krishnapatnam section
- Tracks: 5 ft 6 in (1,676 mm) broad gauge

Construction
- Structure type: Standard (on ground)
- Accessible: Disabled access

Other information
- Status: Active
- Station code: KAPT
- Zone(s): SCoR
- Division(s): Vijayawada
- Classification: Non-Suburban Grade-3 (NSG-3)

Services
Preceding station	Indian Railways	Following station
Kondapalli towards ?	New Delhi–Chennai main line	Vijayawada towards ?
Route map
Location
- Location within Andhra Pradesh Location within India
- Interactive map

Krishnapatnam railway station (station code:KAPT), is an Indian Railways station in Krishnapatnam of Nellore district in the state of Andhra Pradesh. It is a non-coaching traffic handling station and is mainly utilized for freight transport from Krishnapatnam Port. It is situated on Obulavaripalle–Krishnapatnam section of Vijayawada railway division of South Coast Railway zone.

== See also ==
- List of railway stations in India
