= Medak–Akkannapet section =

Rail line in Telangana, India

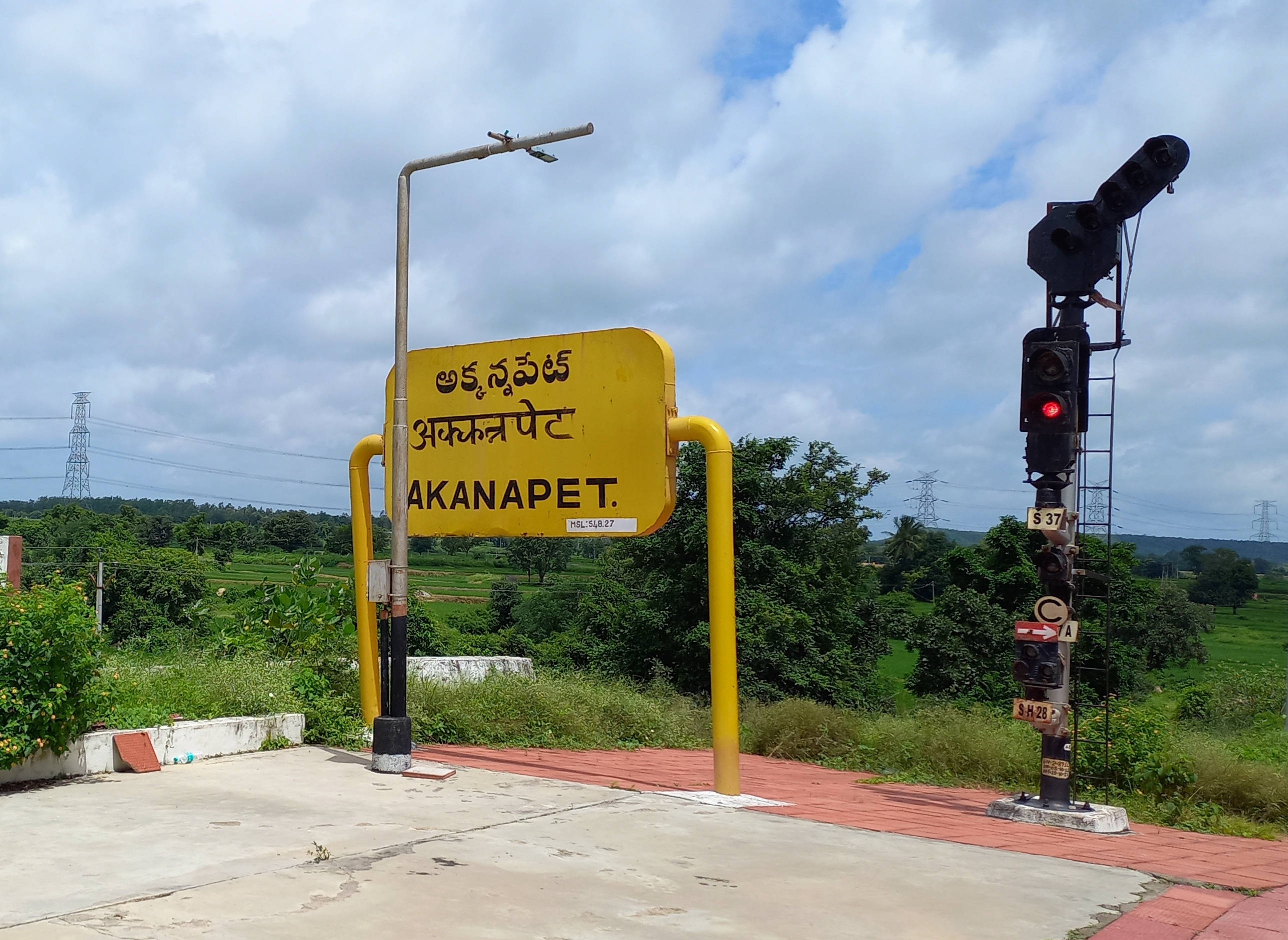

Overview
- Status: Operational
- Owner: Indian Railways
- Locale: Telangana
- Termini: Medak; Akkannapet

Service
- Operator: South Central Railway

Technical
- Track length: 17.2 km (10.7 mi)
- Track gauge: 5 ft 6 in (1,676 mm) broad gauge
- Electrification: Yes
- Operating speed: 100 km/h

The Medak–Akkannapet section is an operational railway line of the Indian Railways. The section falls under the jurisdiction of Hyderabad of South Central Railway zone.

== The project ==
The project was sanctioned in the year 2012–13. The foundation was laid on 19 January 2014 at Medak by Vijayashanthi (MP). The total length of the section is 17.2 km (10.7 mi) and the total cost of the project is ₹1.293 billion (US$13 million). The Project was inaugurated in September 2022.
