= Akhaura–Agartala line =

Railway line in Bangladesh and India

Overview
- Status: Non-operational
- Owner: Bangladesh Railway; Indian Railways
- Locale: Bangladesh; India
- Termini: Akhaura Junction railway station; Agartala railway station
- Stations: 4

Service
- Type: Railway line
- Operators: East Zone (Bangladesh); Northeast Frontier Railway zone (India)

History
- Opened: 1 November 2023

Technical
- Line length: 12.24 km (7.61 mi)
- Track gauge: Dual gauge (Bangladesh); Broad-gauge (India)

Akhaura–Agartala line is an international railway line between Akhaura in Bangladesh and Agartala in India's northeastern state of Tripura. Conceived as a strategic infrastructure project, the line was expected to significantly reduce travel time between Kolkata and Agartala from 31 hours to 10 hours with lowering the cost of cargo transport between Bangladesh and Northeast India. It was also projected to bolster tourism, enhance bilateral trade and improve connectivity to other northeastern Indian states such as Assam, southern Mizoram and Arunachal Pradesh.

It was formally inaugurated on 1 November 2023 but remains non-operational as of 2025, with pending infrastructural works and the Government of India halting further progress in April 2025.

== History ==
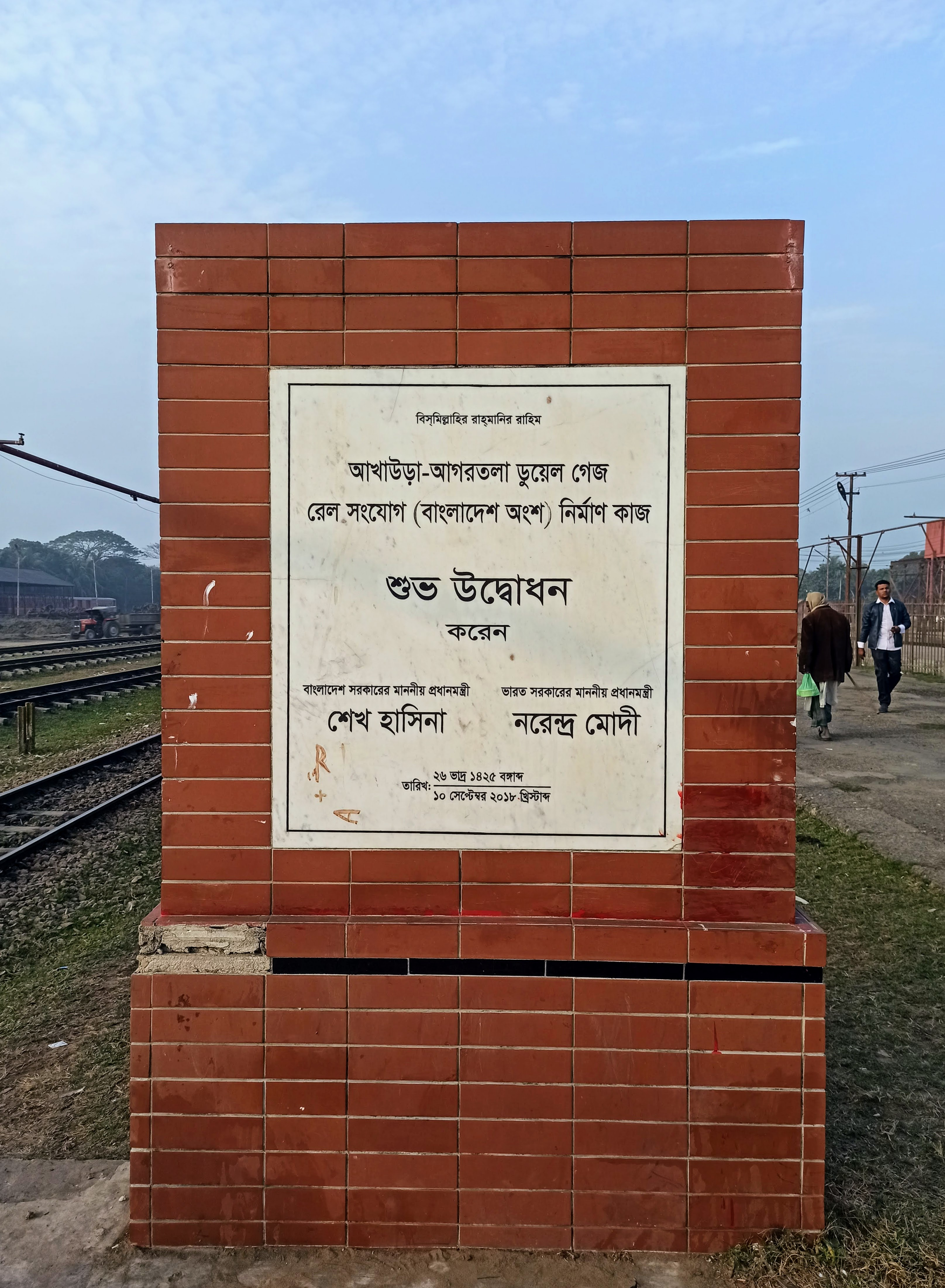
Construction inauguration plaque at Akhaura Junction railway station.

A memorandum of understanding was signed between the Governments of India and Bangladesh on 16 February 2013 to establish the rail connection between Agartala railway station in India's northeastern state of Tripura and Akhaura Junction railway station in Bangladesh. The project involves a 12.24 km railway line, with 5.46 km on the Indian side and 6.78 km in Bangladesh.

The total cost of the project was estimated at ₹972.52 crore, covering both the Indian and Bangladeshi portions. The Indian segment was initially sanctioned at ₹580 crore, but the estimate was later revised, all of which has been released by the Ministry of Development of North Eastern Region. The Bangladeshi segment is being built at a cost of ₹392.52 crore, funded through grant assistance by India’s Ministry of External Affairs.

Construction began on 29 July 2018, but the project faced delays due to the COVID-19 pandemic and missed several deadlines, initially 2020, then pushed to May 2021, June 2022 and June 2023.

A trial run of an empty container train was conducted successfully in September 2023. The line was inaugurated on 1 November 2023 in a virtual ceremony by Indian Prime Minister Narendra Modi and Bangladeshi Prime Minister Sheikh Hasina.

The Indian portion was executed by IRCON International Limited, while the Bangladeshi portion was handled by Bangladesh Railway. A notable infrastructure element on the Indian side is a 3.7 km viaduct, designed to minimize the impact on cultivable land. The railway features dual gauge tracks in Bangladesh and broad gauge tracks in India.

As of 2025, despite the inauguration, regular passenger and freight services remain non-operational due to incomplete approach infrastructure. In April 2025, Government of India halted the project, citing the ongoing political turmoil in Bangladesh and concerns over the safety of labour.
