= Lakhan Majra =

Coordinates: 29°02′42″N 76°28′34″E

Lakhan Majra is a sub tehsil of Rohtak district of Haryana state in India. It has 13 villages and 13 panchayats.
