= Gudur–Renigunta section =

Indian railway segment

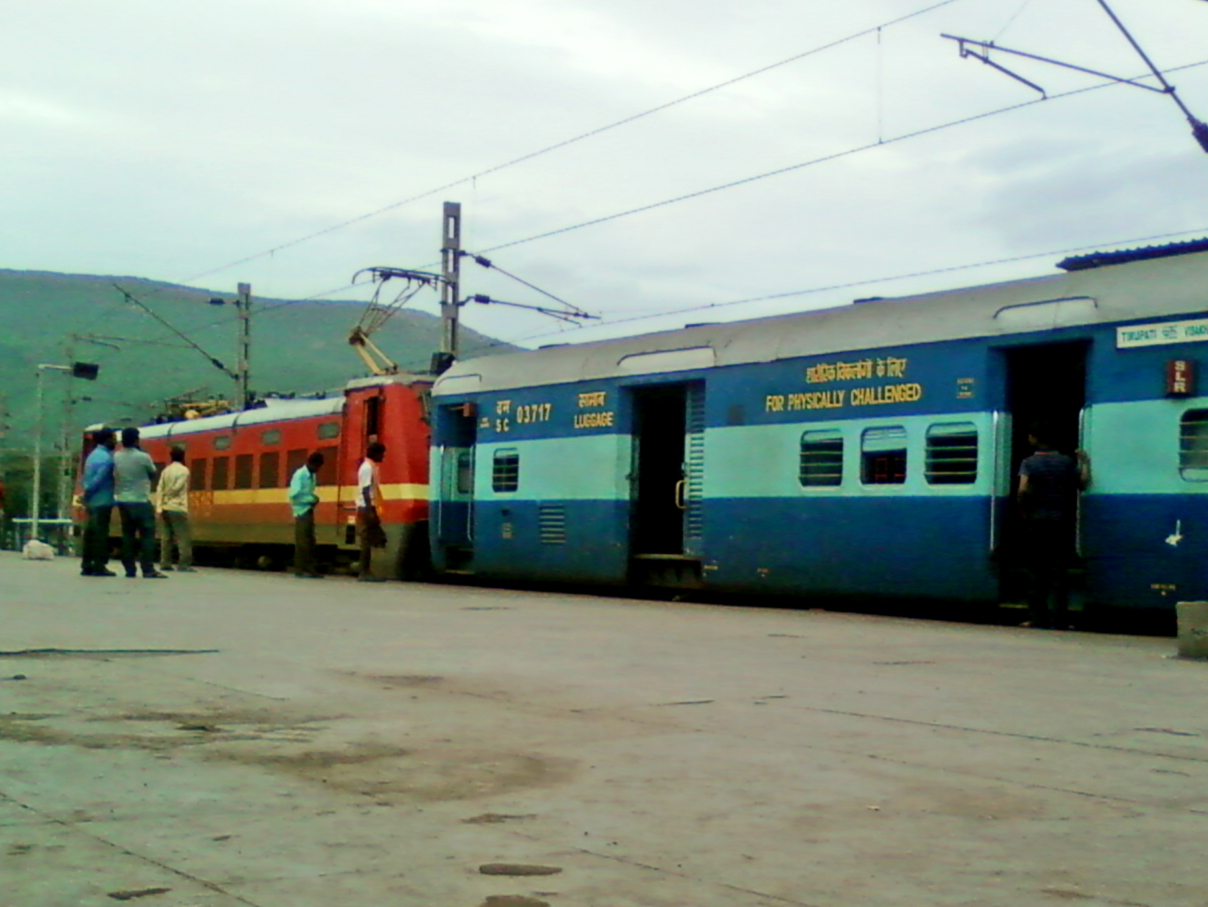
- Tirumala Express is one of the oldest train on this section

Overview
- Status: Operational
- Owner: Indian Railways
- Locale: Andhra Pradesh
- Termini: Gudur; Renigunta

Service
- Operator(s): South Central Railway zone

History
- Opened: 1957; 68 years ago

Technical
- Line length: 134.78 km (83.75 mi)
- Number of tracks: 2
- Track gauge: 1,676 mm (5 ft 6 in)

Gudur–Renigunta section connects Gudur Junction and Renigunta Junction in the Indian state of Andhra Pradesh. Further, this section connects Howrah–Chennai main line at Gudur and Guntakal–Renigunta section at Renigunta.

== History ==
It was owned by Madras and Southern Mahratta Railway. The section is a broad-gauge railway line which was opened on 23 August 1957. The line was sanctioned in the year 1997–98.

== Jurisdiction ==
This branch line is having a length of 134.78 km (83.75 mi) under the Guntakal railway division, excluding Gudur of Vijayawada railway division under South Central Railway zone.
