= Viramgam–Surendra Nagar section =

Railway line in Gujarat, India

Overview
- Status: Operational
- Owner: Indian Railways
- Locale: Gujarat
- Termini: Viramgam; Surendranagar

Service
- Operator(s): Western Railway

History
- Opened: 1872

Technical
- Track length: 65 km (40 mi)
- Number of tracks: 2
- Track gauge: 5 ft 6 in (1,676 mm) broad gauge
- Electrification: Yes
- Operating speed: 100 kmph

The Viramgam–Surendranagar section covers a distance of 65 km in Gujarat.

== History ==
During 19th century Viramgam railway station owned by BB&CI. During which Ahmedabad–Viramgam section was laid. In 1872 BB&CI line was extended to Surendranagar. Later Broad gauge network up to Surendranagar was extended in 1879 by BB & CI Railway The gauge conversion of Viramgam–Hapa section in the year 1980.

== Doubling ==
Doubling of Viramgam Surendranagar section has been completed since October 2015. Trains have started to ply on the newly laid up line.
