= Obulavaripalle–Krishnapatnam section =

Obulavaripalle–Krishnapatnam branch line

Overview
- Status: Operational
- Owner: Indian Railways
- Locale: Andhra Pradesh
- Termini: Obulavaripalle; Krishnapatnam
- Stations: 6

Service
- System: Indian Railways
- Operator(s): Vijayawada division of South Coast Railway zone

History
- Opened: 1 September 2019; 6 years ago

Technical
- Line length: 112 km (70 mi)
- Number of tracks: 1
- Character: At-grade street running
- Track gauge: 5 ft 6 in (1,676 mm) broad gauge

Obulavaripalle–Krishnapatnam branch line is a railway section project in South Central Railway zone, which connects Obulavaripalle of Tirupati district and Krishnapatnam of Nellore district in the Indian state of Andhra Pradesh. Further, this section intersects Howrah–Chennai main line, Guntakal–Renigunta section and Nadikudi–Srikalahasti section. This section has a total length of 33.85 km (21.03 mi) and is administered under Vijayawada railway division of South Coast Railway zone. On 2 March 2014, Venkatachalam–Krishnapatnam part of the section was commissioned.
