= Wankaner–Surendra Nagar section =

Railway line in India

Wankaner–Surendranagar section

Overview
- Status: Operational
- Owner: Indian Railways
- Locale: Gujarat
- Termini: Wankaner Junction; Surendranagar

Service
- Operator: Western Railway

History
- Opened: 1890

Technical
- Track length: 74 km (46 mi)
- Number of tracks: 2
- Track gauge: 5 ft 6 in (1,676 mm) broad gauge

The Wankaner–Surendranagar section belongs to Western Railway of Rajkot Division in Gujarat State.

== History ==
Sir Lakhdiraji, who ruled from 1922 until 1948. Sir Lakhdiraji acted as a ruler, manager, patron and policeman of the state with great authority. Sir Lakhdiraji, like other contemporary rulers of Saurashtra, built roads and a railway network (of seventy miles), connecting Wadhwan and Morbi. Surendranagar–Rajkot section was laid in 1890. Gauge conversion of Viramgam–Hapa section via Surendranagar, Wankaner was completed by 1980. Morvi State Railway was merged into the Western Railway on 5 November 1951.

== Freight ==
About 26 trains pass through this section daily.

== Doubling ==
Doubling work on this section is completed in Feb 2023.
