= Kondapuram =

Kondapuram may refer to:

- Kondapuram, Kadapa district, a village in Kadapa district, Andhra Pradesh, India
- Kondapuram, Nellore district, a village in Nellore district, Andhra Pradesh, India
