= List of railway stations in Haryana =

Railway stations in Haryana in India, under jurisdiction of three Northern Railway zones i.e. Northern Railway zone, North Western Railway zone and North Central Railway zone in the state of Haryana, are as follows:

== Facilities ==
As of february 2025, wifi was available at 144 railway stations in Haryana.

== List ==
Partial list, please help expand.

Station Name	Station Code	District	Railway Zone	Elevation (m)	Category (NSG/SG/other)	Development scheme
Amarpur Jorasi	APJ	Narnaul	North Western Railway zone			
Ambala Cantt. Junction	UMB	Ambala district	Northern Railway zone			
Ambala City	UBC	Ambala district	Northern Railway zone			
Amin	AMN	Kurukshetra district	Northern Railway zone			
Anandpur Kalu						
Arjan Majra						
Asaoti	AST	Faridabad district	Northern Railway zone			
Asan	ASAN	Panipat district	Northern Railway zone			
Asaudah						
Asthal Bohar						
Ateli	AEL	Mahendragarh district	North Western Railway zone			
Aurang Nagar						
Babarpur	BBDE	Panipat district	Northern Railway zone			
Baghpat Road						
Bahadurgarh	BGZ	Jhajjar district	Northern Railway zone			
Ballabgarh	BVH	Faridabad district	Northern Railway zone			
Balamu						
Bamla	BMLL	Bhiwani district	North Western Railway zone			
Banchari	BNCHR	Palwal district	Northern Railway zone			
Barara	RAA	Ambala district	Northern Railway zone			
Barwala	BXC	Hisar district	North Western Railway zone			
Basai Dhankot (Halt)	BSDK	Gurgaon district	Northern Railway zone			
Basai Dhankot	BDXT	Gurgaon district	Northern Railway zone			
Bawal	BWL	Rewari district	North Western Railway zone			
Bawani Khera	BWK	Bhiwani district	North Western Railway zone			
Bazida Jatan	BZJT	Karnal district	Northern Railway zone			
Beri Khas						
Bhaini Khurd	BZK	Karnal district	Northern Railway zone			
Bhainswan	BASN	Sonipat district	Northern Railway zone			
Bhan Kari						
Bharur						
Bhattu	BHT	Fatehabad district	Northern Railway zone			
Bhiwani City	BNW	Bhiwani district	North Western Railway zone			
Bhiwani	BNWC	Bhiwani district	North Western Railway zone			
Bhodwal Majri	BDMJ	Panipat district	Northern Railway zone			
Bhojpur						
Bhuria						
Bishanpur Haryana	BSPH	Jind district	Northern Railway zone			
Budhakhera	BKDE	Jind district	Northern Railway zone			
Bugana	BFN	Hisar district	North Western Railway zone			
Chandari						
Charaud	CRW	Bhiwani district	North Western Railway zone			
Charkhi Dadri	CDK	Bhiwani district	North Western Railway zone			
Chaudharywas						
Dahina Zainabad	DZB	Mahendragarh district	North Western Railway zone			
Dakshin Haryana						
Darazpur	DZP	Yamunanagar district	Northern Railway zone			
Daulatpur Haryana	DULP	Hisar district	North Western Railway zone			
Dhamtan Sahib	DTN	Fatehabad district	Northern Railway zone			
Dhansu	DNX	Hisar district	North Western Railway zone			
Dharodi	DHY	Jind district	Northern Railway zone			
Dhirpur	DPP	Kurukshetra district	Northern Railway zone			
Dhola Mazra	DHMZ	Kurukshetra district	Northern Railway zone			
Dhulkot	DKT	Ambala district	Northern Railway zone			
Dhurana	DHRN	Sonipat district	Northern Railway zone			
Dighal						
Ding	DING	Fatehabad district	Northern Railway zone			
Diwana	DWNA	Panipat district	Northern Railway zone			
Dukheri	DOKY	Ambala district	Northern Railway zone			
Ellenabad	ENB	Sirsa district	North Western Railway zone			
Faridabad	FDB	Faridabad district	Northern Railway zone			
Faridabad New Town	FDN	Faridabad district	Northern Railway zone			
Farukhnagar	FN	Gurgaon district	Northern Railway zone			
Ganaur	GNU	Sonipat district	Northern Railway zone			
Gangay						
Garhi Harsaru (Junction)	GHRAJ / GHH	Gurgaon district	Northern Railway zone			
Geong	GXG	Kaithal district	Northern Railway zone			
Gharaunda	GRA	Karnal district	Northern Railway zone			
Ghaso	GSO	Jind district	Northern Railway zone			
Gohana	GHNA	Sonipat district	Northern Railway zone			
Goghpur						
Gugalwa Kirtan (Halt)	GLKN	Bhiwani district	North Western Railway zone			
Gularbhoj						
Hansi	HANSI	Hisar district	North Western Railway zone			
Harana Kalan	HNN	Sonipat district	Northern Railway zone			
Hathin		Palwal district	Northern Railway zone			
Hisar Junction	HSR	Hisar district	North Western Railway zone			
Himmatpura	HQM	Fatehabad district	Northern Railway zone			
Hodal	HDL	Palwal district	Northern Railway zone			
Holambi Kalan	HMK		Northern Railway zone			
Inchhapuri	IHP	Gurgaon district	Northern Railway zone			
Ismaila (Haryana)	ISM	Rohtak district	Northern Railway zone			
Israna	IRA	Panipat district	Northern Railway zone			
Jagadhri	JUD	Yamunanagar district	Northern Railway zone			
Jagadhri Workshop	JUDW	Yamunanagar district	Northern Railway zone			
Jind City	JYC	Jind district	Northern Railway zone			
Jind Junction	JIND	Jind district	Northern Railway zone			
Jhajjar	JHJ	Jhajjar district	Northern Railway zone			
Jharli	JRL	Jhajjar district	Northern Railway zone			
Julana	JNA	Jind district	Northern Railway zone			
Kaithal (New Kaithal)	KLE / NKLE	Kaithal district	Northern Railway zone			
Kalanaur Kalan	KLNK	Rohtak district	Northern Railway zone			
Kalayat	KIY	Kaithal district	Northern Railway zone			
Kalka	KLK	Panchkula district	Northern Railway zone			
Kalkund						
Kalanwali		Sirsa district	North Western Railway zone			
Kanina Khas	KNN	Mahendragarh district	North Western Railway zone			
Karnal	KUN	Karnal district	Northern Railway zone			
Kathuwas						
Kharkhoda		Sonipat district	Northern Railway zone			
Khori						
Kosli	KSV	Rewari district	North Western Railway zone			
Kund						
Kurukshetra Junction	KKDE	Kurukshetra district	Northern Railway zone			
Kurukshetra City		Kurukshetra district	Northern Railway zone			
Lahli						
Loharu	LHU	Bhiwani district	North Western Railway zone			
Lull						
Madlauda	MDD	Panipat district	Northern Railway zone			
Mahendragarh	MHG	Mahendragarh district	North Western Railway zone			
Manheru						
Mandi Adampur		Hisar district	North Western Railway zone			
Mandi Dabwali	MDB	Sirsa district	North Western Railway zone			
Manesar	MNE	Gurgaon district	Northern Railway zone			
Matlabpur						
Mirzapur Bachhaud						
Mohri						
Mundlana						
Mustafabad						
Nara						
Naraina						
Narnaul	NRU	Mahendragarh district	North Western Railway zone			
Narwana Junction	NWR	Jind district	Northern Railway zone			
Nilokheri	NLKH	Karnal district	Northern Railway zone			
Nimbahera						
Nizampur						
Palwal	PWL	Palwal district	Northern Railway zone			
Panipat Junction	PNP	Panipat district	Northern Railway zone			
Pandu Pindara						
Pataudi Road	PTRD	Gurgaon district	Northern Railway zone			
Patli						
Pehowa		Kurukshetra district	Northern Railway zone			
Pilu Khera						
Pindarsi						
Pirthala Llauda						
Raipur Haryana						
Rathdhana						
Rewari Junction	RE	Rewari district	North Western Railway zone			
Rohad Nagar						
Rohtak Junction	ROK	Rohtak district	Northern Railway zone			
Rukhi						
Rundhi						
Safidon	SDN	Jind district	Northern Railway zone			
Sahibabad Markanda		Kurukshetra district	Northern Railway zone			
Samalkha	SMK	Panipat district	Northern Railway zone			
Samar Gopalpur						
Sampla	SPZ	Rohtak district	Northern Railway zone			
Satrod						
Satnali	SNI	Mahendragarh district	North Western Railway zone			
Shahbad Markanda	SHM	Kurukshetra district	Northern Railway zone			
Sholaka						
Sirsa	SSA	Sirsa district	North Western Railway zone			
Siwani		Bhiwani district	North Western Railway zone			
Siwaha						
Sonipat	SNP	Sonipat district	Northern Railway zone			
Sukhrali						
Taj Nagar						
Tandwal						
Taraori	TRA	Karnal district	Northern Railway zone			
Thanesar City		Kurukshetra district	Northern Railway zone			
Tik						
Tohana	TOH	Fatehabad district	Northern Railway zone			
Uchana	UCA	Jind district	Northern Railway zone			
Uklana	UKN	Hisar/Jind district	Northern Railway zone			
Umbala Sadar		Ambala district	Northern Railway zone			
Yamunanagar–Jagadhri	YPJ	Yamunanagar district	Northern Railway zone			

== See also ==
- Railway in Haryana
- Transport in Haryana
- Transport in Delhi
